= I. grandis =

I. grandis may refer to:

- Idiops grandis, a spider species in the genus Idiops found in South Africa
- Inula grandis, a flowering plant species in the genus Inula
- Isodictya grandis, the flat leaf sponge, a marine demosponge species endemic to the west coast of South Africa to False Bay

== See also ==
- Grandis (disambiguation)
