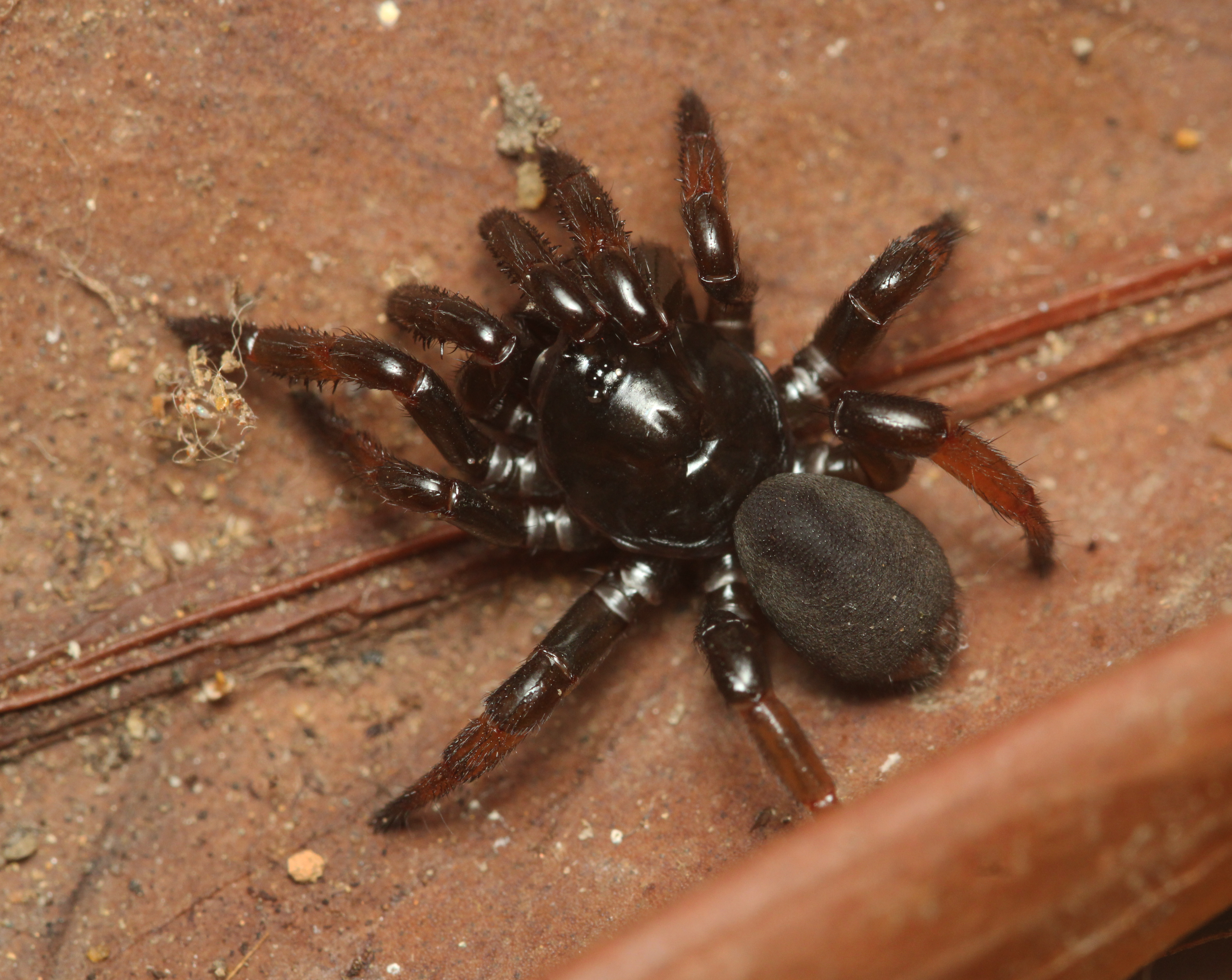

Scientific classification
- Kingdom: Animalia
- Phylum: Arthropoda
- Subphylum: Chelicerata
- Class: Arachnida
- Order: Araneae
- Infraorder: Mygalomorphae
- Family: Idiopidae
- Genus: Idiops
- Species: I. opifex

Binomial name
- Idiops opifex (Simon, 1889)

= Idiops opifex =

Species of spider

Idiops opifex is a species of spider found in French Guiana.
