= Heligmomerus taprobanicus =

Scientific classification
- Kingdom: Animalia
- Phylum: Arthropoda
- Subphylum: Chelicerata
- Class: Arachnida
- Order: Araneae
- Infraorder: Mygalomorphae
- Family: Idiopidae
- Genus: Heligmomerus
- Species: H. taprobanicus

Binomial name
- Heligmomerus taprobanicus Simon, 1892

Species of spider

Heligmomerus taprobanicus, is a species of spider of the genus Heligmomerus. It is endemic to Sri Lanka.
