= Idiops pretoriae =

Pretoria Idiops Trapdoor Spider

Conservation status
- Vulnerable (SANBI Red List)

Scientific classification
- Kingdom: Animalia
- Phylum: Arthropoda
- Subphylum: Chelicerata
- Class: Arachnida
- Order: Araneae
- Infraorder: Mygalomorphae
- Family: Idiopidae
- Genus: Idiops
- Species: I. pretoriae

Binomial name
- Idiops pretoriae (Pocock, 1898)

Synonyms
- Acanthodon pretoriae Pocock, 1898

Species of spider

Idiops pretoriae is a species of spider in the family Idiopidae. It is endemic to South Africa and is commonly known as the Pretoria Idiops trapdoor spider.

== Distribution ==
Idiops pretoriae is a Gauteng endemic recorded from several localities around Pretoria at altitudes ranging from 1,120 to 1,758 m above sea level.

== Habitat and ecology ==
The species inhabits the Grassland biome. It lives in silk-lined burrows closed with a trapdoor. The burrows are situated amongst grass with lids covered with pieces of dry grass attached to them. The lid is provided on the underside with minute holes, has a broad hinge, and is D-shaped. The burrows have a conspicuous slant.

== Description ==
Idiops pretoriae is known from both sexes, though only images of dead females have been provided. The carapace and legs are reddish brown, while the abdomen is greyish black. Total length is 31.5 mm.

== Conservation ==
Idiops pretoriae is listed as Vulnerable by the South African National Biodiversity Institute. The species has lost most of its habitat to urban development, with ongoing habitat loss. With between five and ten extant locations, this species qualifies as Vulnerable.

== Taxonomy ==
The species was originally described by Reginald Innes Pocock in 1898 as Acanthodon pretoriae, sampled prior to 1898. The female was later described by Hewitt in 1910. The species has not been revised.
