= Idiops nigropilosus =

Scientific classification
- Kingdom: Animalia
- Phylum: Arthropoda
- Subphylum: Chelicerata
- Class: Arachnida
- Order: Araneae
- Infraorder: Mygalomorphae
- Family: Idiopidae
- Genus: Idiops
- Species: I. nigropilosus

Binomial name
- Idiops nigropilosus (Hewitt, 1919)

Synonyms
- Acanthodon nigropilosus Hewitt, 1919

Species of spider

Idiops nigropilosus is a species of spider in the family Idiopidae. It is endemic to South Africa.

== Distribution ==
Idiops nigropilosus is recorded from Gauteng and Mpumalanga. The species occurs at an altitude of 1,698 m above sea level.

== Habitat and ecology ==
The species inhabits the Grassland biome. It lives in silk-lined burrows closed with a trapdoor.

== Description ==
Idiops nigropilosus is known from both sexes and has been partly illustrated.

== Conservation ==
Idiops nigropilosus is listed as Data Deficient due to insufficient knowledge about its location, distribution and threats. The species is under-collected and identification is still problematic. More sampling is needed to determine the species' range.

== Taxonomy ==
The species was originally described by John Hewitt in 1919 as Acanthodon nigropilosus from Carolina. The species has not been revised.
