= Idiops crudeni =

Scientific classification
- Kingdom: Animalia
- Phylum: Arthropoda
- Subphylum: Chelicerata
- Class: Arachnida
- Order: Araneae
- Infraorder: Mygalomorphae
- Family: Idiopidae
- Genus: Idiops
- Species: I. crudeni

Binomial name
- Idiops crudeni (Hewitt, 1914)

Synonyms
- Acanthodon crudeni Hewitt, 1914

Species of spider

Idiops crudeni is a species of spider in the family Idiopidae. It is endemic to South Africa.

== Distribution ==
Idiops crudeni is endemic to Eastern Cape and is only known from the type locality Alicedale at an altitude of 283 m above sea level.

== Habitat and ecology ==
The species inhabits the Thicket biome. It lives in silk-lined burrows closed with a trapdoor.

== Description ==
Idiops crudeni is known from both sexes but has not been illustrated. The carapace and appendages are yellowish with brown or olive tinge, with lower surfaces a little paler. The abdomen is pale above and below with a faint purplish tinge on the median area anteriorly above. Total length is 21.5 mm.

== Conservation ==
Idiops crudeni is listed as Data Deficient due to insufficient knowledge about its distribution range and threats. More sampling is needed to determine the species' range.

== Taxonomy ==
The species was originally described by John Hewitt in 1914 as Acanthodon crudeni. The placement of the species is problematic and taxonomic revision is needed.
