= Prothemenops siamensis =

Scientific classification
- Domain: Eukaryota
- Kingdom: Animalia
- Phylum: Arthropoda
- Subphylum: Chelicerata
- Class: Arachnida
- Order: Araneae
- Infraorder: Mygalomorphae
- Family: Idiopidae
- Genus: Prothemenops
- Species: P. siamensis

Binomial name
- Prothemenops siamensis Schwendinger, 1991

Species of spider

Prothemenops siamensis is a species of armored trapdoor spider in the family Idiopidae. It is found in Thailand.
