= Idiops pullus =

North West Idiops Trapdoor Spider

Conservation status
- Least Concern (SANBI Red List)

Scientific classification
- Kingdom: Animalia
- Phylum: Arthropoda
- Subphylum: Chelicerata
- Class: Arachnida
- Order: Araneae
- Infraorder: Mygalomorphae
- Family: Idiopidae
- Genus: Idiops
- Species: I. pullus

Binomial name
- Idiops pullus Tucker, 1917

Species of spider

Idiops pullus is a species of spider in the family Idiopidae. It is endemic to South Africa and is commonly known as the North West Idiops trapdoor spider.

== Distribution ==
Idiops pullus is recorded from the Northern Cape and North West. The species occurs at altitudes ranging from 1,218 to 1,326 m above sea level.

== Habitat and ecology ==
The species inhabits the Grassland and Savanna biomes. It lives in silk-lined burrows closed with a trapdoor.

== Description ==
Idiops pullus is known only from males. The carapace and legs are dark brown, with legs paler distally. The abdomen is clothed with short dark hairs and is almost the same colour dorsally as the carapace, though slightly darker anteriorly. The ventral surface of the abdomen is dull ochraceous. The spinnerets, lung operculae, and genital shield are pale brown, while the sternum and coxae are pale brown.

== Conservation ==
Idiops pullus is listed as Least Concern by the South African National Biodiversity Institute. Although the species is presently known only from males, it has a wide geographical range. More sampling is needed to collect females.

== Taxonomy ==
The species was described by R. W. E. Tucker in 1917 from Mafikeng in the North West. The species has not been revised.
