= Idiops gerhardti =

Scientific classification
- Kingdom: Animalia
- Phylum: Arthropoda
- Subphylum: Chelicerata
- Class: Arachnida
- Order: Araneae
- Infraorder: Mygalomorphae
- Family: Idiopidae
- Genus: Idiops
- Species: I. gerhardti

Binomial name
- Idiops gerhardti Hewitt, 1913

Species of spider

Idiops gerhardti is a species of spider in the family Idiopidae. It is endemic to South Africa.

== Distribution ==
Idiops gerhardti is a Mpumalanga endemic known only from the type locality Doornkop, near Belfast, at an altitude of 1,893 m above sea level.

== Habitat and ecology ==
The species inhabits the Savanna biome. It lives in silk-lined burrows closed with a trapdoor.

== Description ==
Idiops gerhardti is known only from females. The carapace and legs are reddish brown, while the abdomen is pale, a little fuscous posteriorly.

The species is apparently very distinct and immediately recognised by the characters of the posterior row of eyes. The frontal eyes are large and oval, about half a long diameter apart and looking obliquely forwards. The posterior lateral eyes are reniform, only very slightly longer than the posterior medians. The rectangle formed by the four median eyes is very slightly wider behind. The anterior median eyes are round, nearly two diameters apart. The posterior median eyes are quite as long as the anterior medians but longitudinally oval.

== Conservation ==
Idiops gerhardti is listed as Data Deficient for taxonomic reasons. The placement of the male is problematic and more sampling is needed.

== Taxonomy ==
The species was described by John Hewitt in 1913. The species has not been revised and the placement of the male is problematic, requiring further taxonomic work.
