= Idiops gracilipes =

Scientific classification
- Kingdom: Animalia
- Phylum: Arthropoda
- Subphylum: Chelicerata
- Class: Arachnida
- Order: Araneae
- Infraorder: Mygalomorphae
- Family: Idiopidae
- Genus: Idiops
- Species: I. gracilipes

Binomial name
- Idiops gracilipes (Hewitt, 1919)

Synonyms
- Acanthodon gracilipes Hewitt, 1919

Species of spider

Idiops gracilipes is a species of spider in the family Idiopidae. It is endemic to South Africa.

== Distribution ==
Idiops gracilipes is an Eastern Cape endemic known only from the type locality East London at an altitude of 56 m above sea level.

== Habitat and ecology ==
The species inhabits the Thicket biome. It lives in silk-lined burrows closed with a trapdoor.

== Description ==
Idiops gracilipes is known from both sexes. The carapace and appendages are yellowish brown, while the abdomen is somewhat infuscated superiorly. Total length is 13 mm in males and 15 mm in females.

== Conservation ==
Idiops gracilipes is listed as Data Deficient due to insufficient knowledge about its distribution, habitat and threats. More sampling is needed to determine the species' range.

== Taxonomy ==
The species was originally described by John Hewitt in 1919 as Acanthodon gracilipes from East London. The species has not been revised.
