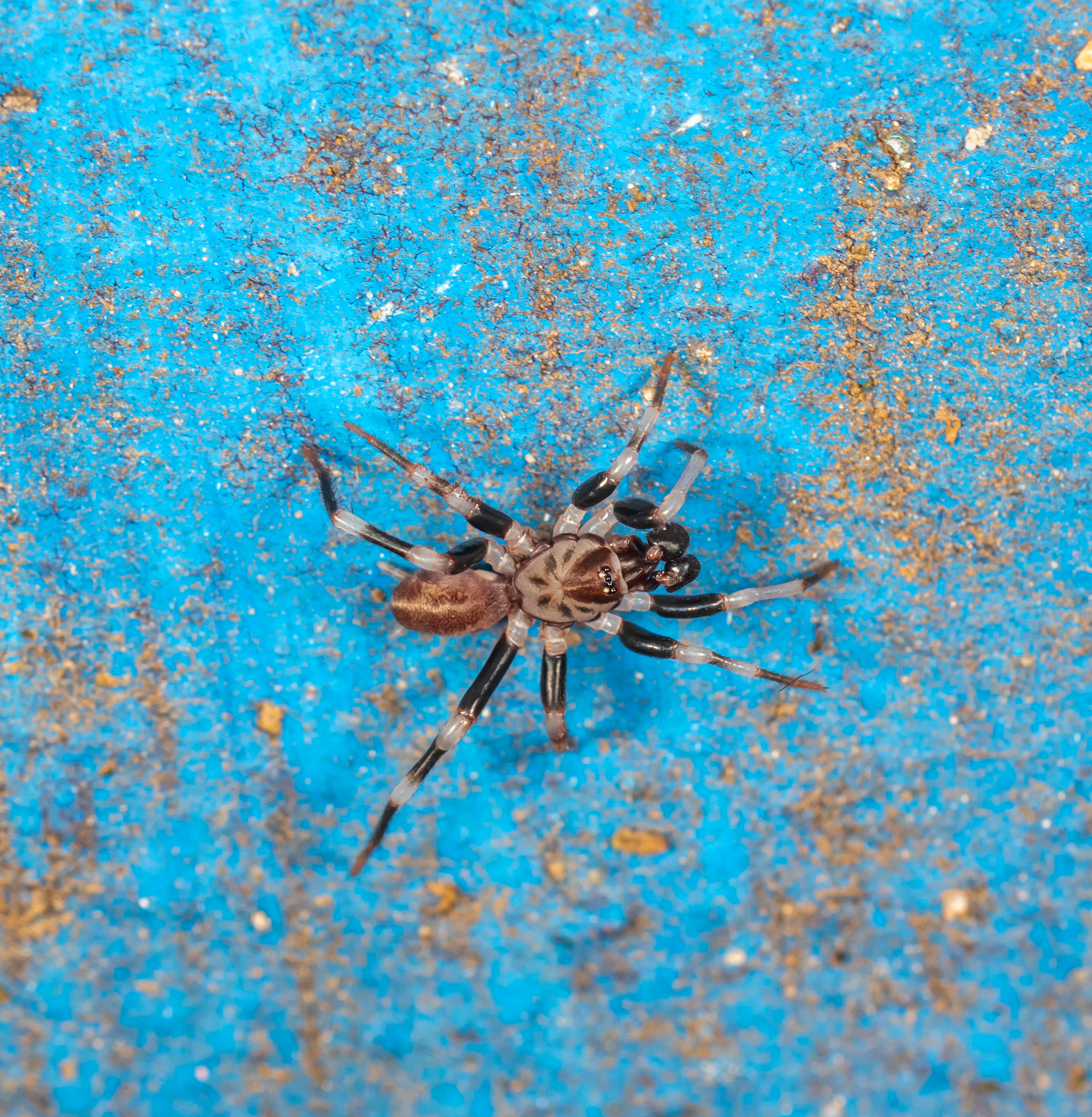
- male from Peru

Scientific classification
- Kingdom: Animalia
- Phylum: Arthropoda
- Subphylum: Chelicerata
- Class: Arachnida
- Order: Araneae
- Infraorder: Mygalomorphae
- Family: Idiopidae
- Genus: Neocteniza
- Species: N. coylei

Binomial name
- Neocteniza coylei Goloboff & Platnick, 1992

= Neocteniza coylei =

Species of spider

Neocteniza coylei is a species of mygalomorph spider in the family Idiopidae. It was first described in 1992 and is found in Peru and Brazil.

== Taxonomy ==
The species was first described by Pablo A. Goloboff and Norman I. Platnick in 1992, based on female specimens collected from the Madre de Dios Region of Peru. The holotype is a female collected at an elevation of 300 m at Rio Tambopata, Madre de Dios, Peru, and is deposited in the Museo de Historia Natural de la Universidad Nacional Mayor de San Marcos (MUSM) in Lima, Peru.

The specific name is a patronym in honor of Dr. Frederick A. Coyle, who collected the type specimen and contributed significantly to mygalomorph spider systematics.

== Distribution ==
N. coylei is known from Peru and Brazil. In Peru, it has been recorded from the Madre de Dios Region, including Rio Tambopata and the Reserva "Cuzco Amazonico" near Puerto Maldonado. The species was later recorded from Brazil in 2024, specifically from Acre state in the Serra do Divisor National Park.

== Habitat ==
The holotype specimen was excavated from a 23 cm deep, trapdoor-covered burrow in a stream bank in the Amazon rainforest. This burrowing behavior with trapdoor construction is typical of the Idiopidae family.

== Description ==
The female holotype has a total length of 21.22 mm, with a carapace length of 11.40 mm and width of 10.04 mm. The carapace, legs, and chelicerae are olive brown in color, with the abdomen darker. The species has distinctive morphological features including seven large teeth on the inner cheliceral margin and 25 smaller teeth on the outer margin.

The male was first described in 2024 by Gomes and colleagues from a specimen collected in Brazil. Males have a total size of 7.84 mm with a grayish carapace and distinctive coloration patterns on the legs. The palpal tibia is strongly thickened with two clusters of spines, and the femurs of legs I and II are dilated.

N. coylei can be distinguished from related species such as Neocteniza minima by its much larger size, more sclerotized epigastric area, and shorter, stronger spines. It differs from N. platnicki by the less curved basal portion of the spermathecal ducts.
