= Idiops parvus =

Scientific classification
- Kingdom: Animalia
- Phylum: Arthropoda
- Subphylum: Chelicerata
- Class: Arachnida
- Order: Araneae
- Infraorder: Mygalomorphae
- Family: Idiopidae
- Genus: Idiops
- Species: I. parvus

Binomial name
- Idiops parvus Hewitt, 1915

Species of spider

Idiops parvus is a species of spider in the family Idiopidae. It is endemic to South Africa.

== Distribution ==
Idiops parvus is a Free State endemic known only from the type locality Zonderhout at Holfontein at an altitude of 1,300 m above sea level.

== Habitat and ecology ==
The species inhabits the Grassland biome. It lives in silk-lined burrows closed with a trapdoor.

== Description ==
Idiops parvus is known only from females. The common tubercle carrying the frontal eyes is so low and the median groove so deep that those eyes are practically situated on two separate tubercles. The species is pale brown almost throughout, with the chelicerae reddish and the abdomen only slightly infuscated anteriorly above. Total length is 29 mm.

== Conservation ==
Idiops parvus is listed as Data Deficient for taxonomic reasons. The species is under-collected and more sampling is needed to collect males and determine the species' range.

== Taxonomy ==
The species was described by John Hewitt in 1915 from Holfontein. The species has not been revised.
