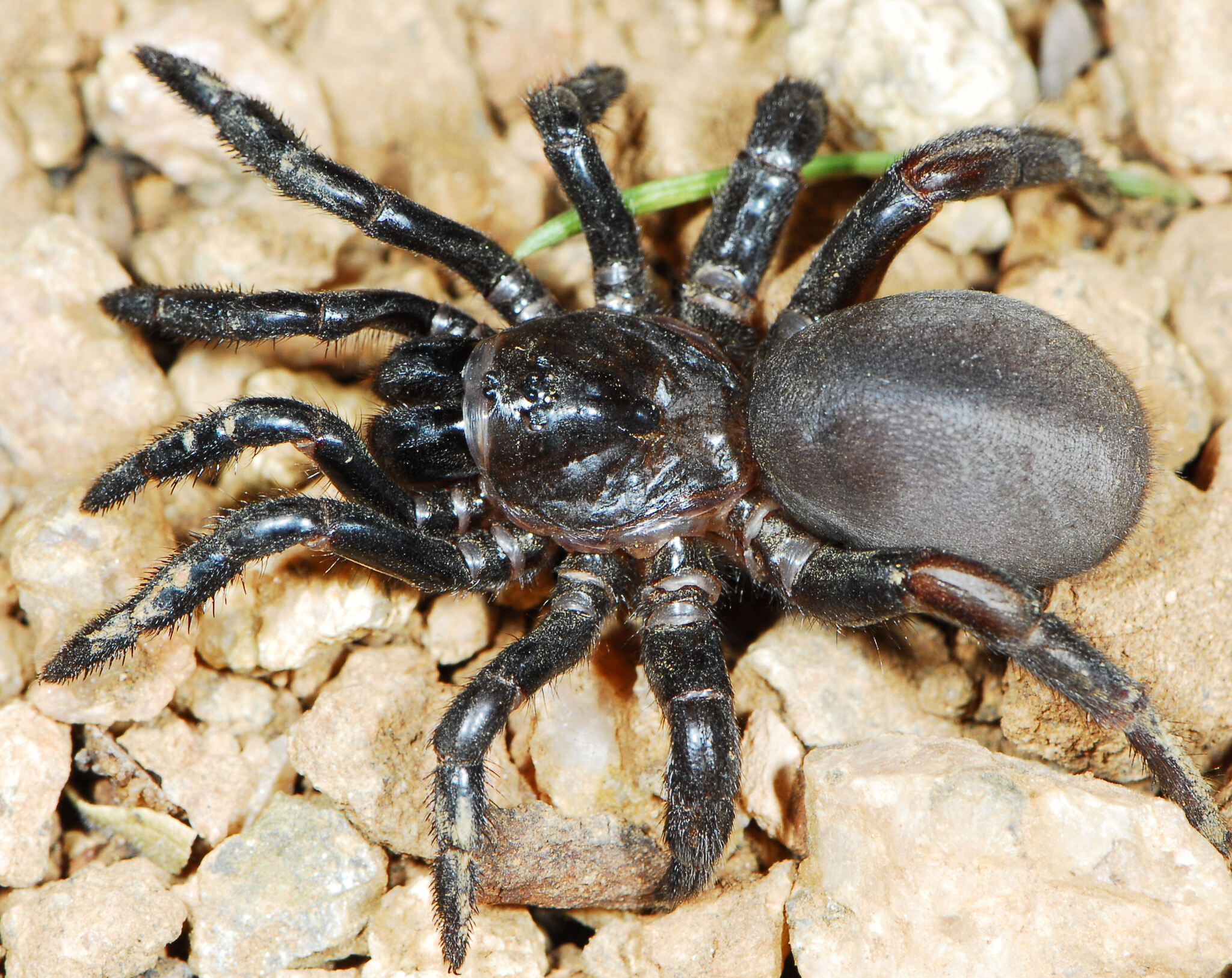
- Female
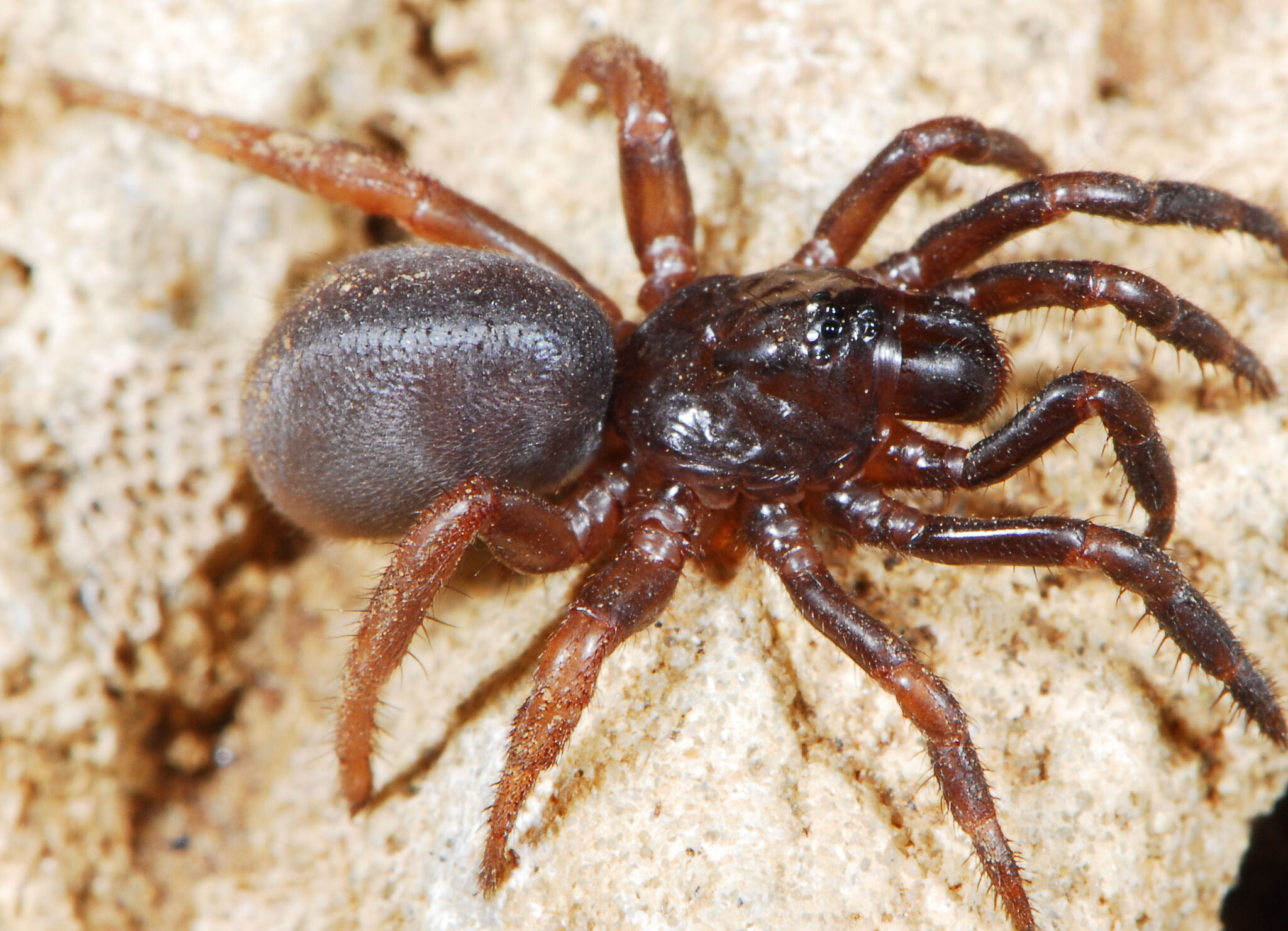
- Female

Scientific classification
- Kingdom: Animalia
- Phylum: Arthropoda
- Subphylum: Chelicerata
- Class: Arachnida
- Order: Araneae
- Infraorder: Mygalomorphae
- Family: Idiopidae
- Genus: Idiops
- Species: I. gunningi

Binomial name
- Idiops gunningi Hewitt, 1913

= Idiops gunningi =

Gunning's Idiops Trapdoor Spider

Species of spider

Idiops gunningi is a species of spider in the family Idiopidae. It is endemic to South Africa and is commonly known as Gunning's Idiops trapdoor spider.

== Distribution ==
Idiops gunningi is recorded from two provinces in South Africa, Gauteng and Limpopo. The species occurs at altitudes ranging from 238 to 1,438 m above sea level.

== Habitat and ecology ==
The species inhabits the Grassland and Savanna biomes. It lives in silk-lined burrows closed with a trapdoor. The burrows are situated amongst grass with lids covered with pieces of dry grass attached to them. The lid is provided on the underside with minute holes, has a broad hinge, and is D-shaped.

== Description ==
Idiops gunningi is known only from females. The carapace and appendages are dark brown, while the abdomen is fuscous.

== Conservation ==
Idiops gunningi is listed as Data Deficient for taxonomic reasons. The species is protected in Groenkloof Nature Reserve and Kruger National Park.

== Taxonomy ==
The species was described by John Hewitt in 1913 from Zwartspruit. Hewitt described a subspecies Idiops gunningi elongatus in 1915 based on four adult specimens from Moorddrift Waterberg. The species has not been revised and more sampling is needed to collect males.
