= Idiops mossambicus =

Mossambique Idiops Trapdoor Spider

Conservation status
- Least Concern (SANBI Red List)

Scientific classification
- Kingdom: Animalia
- Phylum: Arthropoda
- Subphylum: Chelicerata
- Class: Arachnida
- Order: Araneae
- Infraorder: Mygalomorphae
- Family: Idiopidae
- Genus: Idiops
- Species: I. mossambicus

Binomial name
- Idiops mossambicus (Hewitt, 1919)

Synonyms
- Acanthodon mossambicus Hewitt, 1919

Species of spider

Idiops mossambicus is a species of spider in the family Idiopidae. It occurs in South Africa and Mozambique and is commonly known as the Mossambique Idiops trapdoor spider.

== Distribution ==
Idiops mossambicus is recorded from KwaZulu-Natal in South Africa and Mpumalanga, with additional records from Mozambique. The species occurs at altitudes ranging from 47 to 295 m above sea level.

== Habitat and ecology ==
The species inhabits the Savanna biome.The spider dwells in silk-lined burrows covered with a trapdoor.

== Description ==
Idiops mossambicus is known from both sexes. The carapace and appendages are pale yellowish brown, while the abdomen is infuscated. Total length is 13.25 mm in males and 18.5 mm in females.

== Conservation ==
Idiops mossambicus is listed as Least Concern by the South African National Biodiversity Institute due to its wide global range. The species is protected in Ndumo Game Reserve and Kruger National Park.

== Taxonomy ==
The species was originally described by John Hewitt in 1919 as Acanthodon mossambicus from Mozambique. The species has not been revised.
