= Idiops microps =

Scientific classification
- Kingdom: Animalia
- Phylum: Arthropoda
- Subphylum: Chelicerata
- Class: Arachnida
- Order: Araneae
- Infraorder: Mygalomorphae
- Family: Idiopidae
- Genus: Idiops
- Species: I. microps

Binomial name
- Idiops microps (Hewitt, 1913)

Synonyms
- Acanthodon microps Hewitt, 1913

Species of spider

Idiops microps is a species of spider in the family Idiopidae. It is endemic to South Africa.

== Distribution ==
Idiops microps is an Eastern Cape endemic known only from the type locality Grahamstown Grey Reservoir at an altitude of 552 m above sea level.

== Habitat and ecology ==
The species inhabits the Thicket biome. It lives in silk-lined burrows closed with a trapdoor.

== Description ==
Idiops microps is known only from females. The carapace and appendages are olivaceous brown above, with the abdomen having a dull purplish tinge. Lower surfaces are somewhat paler with the sternum castaneous and the abdomen pale. Total length is 18 mm.

== Conservation ==
Idiops microps is listed as Data Deficient for taxonomic reasons. The species is under-collected and the identification of the male is still problematic. More sampling is needed to determine the species' range.

== Taxonomy ==
The species was originally described by John Hewitt in 1913 as Acanthodon microps from Grahamstown. The species has not been revised.
