= Heligmomerus caffer =

Limpopo Heligmomerus Trapdoor Spider

Scientific classification
- Kingdom: Animalia
- Phylum: Arthropoda
- Subphylum: Chelicerata
- Class: Arachnida
- Order: Araneae
- Infraorder: Mygalomorphae
- Family: Idiopidae
- Genus: Heligmomerus
- Species: H. caffer

Binomial name
- Heligmomerus caffer Purcell, 1903

Species of spider

Heligmomerus caffer is a species of spider in the family Idiopidae. It is endemic to South Africa and is commonly known as the Limpopo Heligmomerus trapdoor spider.

== Distribution ==
Heligmomerus caffer is endemic to South Africa, where it is presently known only from two localities in Limpopo province, Leydsdorp and Waterberg.

== Habitat and ecology ==
Heligmomerus caffer lives in silk-lined burrows made in the soil. The species is sampled from the Savanna biome at altitudes ranging from 628 to 1467 m above sea level.

== Description ==
The species is known only from females. The colour of the carapace and legs is reddish brown with the underside more yellowish. The ocular area is nearly one-half wider than long.

== Conservation ==
Heligmomerus caffer is listed as Data Deficient by the South African National Biodiversity Institute for taxonomic reasons. The species is presently known only from two localities but is suspected to be under collected. Threats to the species are unknown. Some more sampling is needed to collect males and to determine the species range.

== Taxonomy ==
Heligmomerus caffer was described by W. F. Purcell in 1903 from Leydsdorp. The species has not been revised and is known only from females.
