= Scalidognathus oreophilus =

Scientific classification
- Kingdom: Animalia
- Phylum: Arthropoda
- Subphylum: Chelicerata
- Class: Arachnida
- Order: Araneae
- Infraorder: Mygalomorphae
- Family: Idiopidae
- Genus: Scalidognathus
- Species: S. oreophilus

Binomial name
- Scalidognathus oreophilus Simon, 1892

Species of spider

Scalidognathus oreophilus, is a species of spider of the genus Scalidognathus. It is endemic to Sri Lanka.
