= Titanidiops canariensis =

Scientific classification
- Kingdom: Animalia
- Phylum: Arthropoda
- Subphylum: Chelicerata
- Class: Arachnida
- Order: Araneae
- Infraorder: Mygalomorphae
- Family: Idiopidae
- Genus: Titanidiops
- Species: T. canariensis

Binomial name
- Titanidiops canariensis Wunderlich, 1992

Species of trapdoor spider

Titanidiops canariensis is a species of trapdoor spiders belonging belonging to the family Idiopidae (armored trapdoor spiders). They live on the archipelago of the Canary Islands, specifically inhabiting the easternmost regions of the islands.

== Evolutionary history ==
The evolutionary history of Titanidiops canariensis is complex. The Canary Islands, which it lives on, formed as a result of volcanic eruptions during the Miocene epoch and persisting today. These islands have never been connected to the mainland, which makes the presence of this species on the islands unique, as Mygalomorphs, with a few exceptions, are largely absent from oceanic islands (possibly due to low dispersal abilities). There have also been no reported cases of aerial dispersal of spiders within the family Idiopodae.

Their ancestors likely originated from Northern Africa (although there have been no closely related Moroccan Titanidiops species discovered) and colonized the island around 2.29 million years ago or 4.28–0.05 million years ago during the Miocene or Pliocene epochs. It is known that there was only one colonization of the islands based on phylogenetic analysis revealing a monophyletic tree. The method of arriving to the islands is unknown. It may have colonized the islands in a similar way to the genus Dysdera, which is also from the same region. It possibly colonised the islands by transporting itself on floating islands of debris. The island of Fuerteventura seems to have two separate colonization events from northern Lanzarote and possibly southern Lanzarote.

== Possible split ==
The taxonomy of mygalomorph spiders is difficult to resolve, due to them being phenotypically conservative. Their genetic trees are extensive, and it is difficult to distinguish between fragmented populations and independent evolutionary lineages of species. Models of the phylogeny of Titanidiops canariensis show that there seems to be a basal split in the tree, suggesting that Titanidiops canariensis may actually be two species (this second lineage is referred to as the "JSF" species). These populations are geographically isolated, except on one location where they overlap. They are also genetically isolated, showing little gene flow between the two.
