= Idiops hirsutus =

Scientific classification
- Kingdom: Animalia
- Phylum: Arthropoda
- Subphylum: Chelicerata
- Class: Arachnida
- Order: Araneae
- Infraorder: Mygalomorphae
- Family: Idiopidae
- Genus: Idiops
- Species: I. hirsutus

Binomial name
- Idiops hirsutus (Hewitt, 1919)

Synonyms
- Acanthodon hirsutus Hewitt, 1919

Species of spider

`Idiops hirsutus is a species of spider in the family Idiopidae. It is endemic to South Africa.

== Distribution ==
Idiops hirsutus is an Eastern Cape endemic known only from the type locality East London at an altitude of 56 m above sea level.

== Habitat and ecology ==
The species inhabits the Thicket biome. It lives in silk-lined burrows closed with a trapdoor.

== Description ==
Idiops hirsutus is known from both sexes. The carapace and legs are pale yellowish brown, while the abdomen is somewhat infuscated superiorly. They also possess quite muscular forelegs. Total length is 9.8 mm.

== Conservation ==
Idiops hirsutus is listed as Data Deficient due to insufficient knowledge about its habitat, distribution and threats. The species is under-collected and more sampling is needed.

== Taxonomy ==
The species was originally described by John Hewitt in 1919 as Acanthodon hirsutus from East London. The species has not been revised.
