= Idiops monticola =

Wonderboom Idiops Trapdoor Spider

Conservation status
- Least Concern (SANBI Red List)

Scientific classification
- Kingdom: Animalia
- Phylum: Arthropoda
- Subphylum: Chelicerata
- Class: Arachnida
- Order: Araneae
- Infraorder: Mygalomorphae
- Family: Idiopidae
- Genus: Idiops
- Species: I. monticola

Binomial name
- Idiops monticola (Hewitt, 1916)

Synonyms
- Acanthodon monticola Hewitt, 1916

Species of spider

Idiops monticola is a species of spider in the family Idiopidae. It is endemic to South Africa and is commonly known as the Wonderboom Idiops trapdoor spider.

== Distribution ==
Idiops monticola is recorded from seven provinces in South Africa, Eastern Cape, Free State, Gauteng, KwaZulu-Natal, Limpopo, Mpumalanga, and North West. The species occurs at altitudes ranging from 268 to 1,758 m above sea level.

== Habitat and ecology ==
The species inhabits the Grassland and Savanna biomes. It lives in silk-lined burrows closed with a trapdoor.

== Description ==
Idiops monticola is known from both sexes. The carapace and legs are olive-brown, with the pedipalps and first two pairs of legs darker than the hind two pairs of legs. This is an unusually small species. Total length is 11 mm in females and 9 mm in males.

== Conservation ==
Idiops monticola is listed as Least Concern by the South African National Biodiversity Institute due to its wide geographic range. The species is protected in several reserves including Erfenis Dam Nature Reserve, Kloofendal Nature Reserve, Ophathe Game Reserve, Kruger National Park, and Polokwane Nature Reserve.

== Taxonomy ==
The species was originally described by John Hewitt in 1916 as Acanthodon monticola from Magaliesberg Little Wonderboom in Gauteng. The species has not been revised but requires taxonomic work, as it has three pairs of sigilla and may need to be moved to Segregara.
