= Idiops hamiltoni =

Scientific classification
- Kingdom: Animalia
- Phylum: Arthropoda
- Subphylum: Chelicerata
- Class: Arachnida
- Order: Araneae
- Infraorder: Mygalomorphae
- Family: Idiopidae
- Genus: Idiops
- Species: I. hamiltoni

Binomial name
- Idiops hamiltoni (Pocock, 1902)

Synonyms
- Acanthodon hamiltoni Pocock, 1902

Species of spider

Idiops hamiltoni is a species of spider in the family Idiopidae. It is endemic to South Africa.

== Distribution ==
Idiops hamiltoni is a Free State endemic recorded from Vredefort and Bothaville at an altitude of 1,426 m above sea level.

== Habitat and ecology ==
The species inhabits the Grassland biome. It lives in silk-lined burrows closed with a trapdoor.

== Description ==
Idiops hamiltoni is known from both sexes but has not been illustrated. The body is uniformly ochraceous with black ocular tubercles. The posterior lateral eyes are very large, with the distance between posterior medians and posterior laterals about twice that between the posterior medians. The species differs from other South African species in the large size of the posterior lateral eyes and the proximity of the posterior median eyes. Total length is 10 mm.

== Conservation ==
Idiops hamiltoni is listed as Data Deficient due to insufficient knowledge about its distribution and threats. More sampling is needed to determine the species' range.

== Taxonomy ==
The species was originally described by Reginald Innes Pocock in 1902 as Acanthodon hamiltoni from Vredefort based on an immature specimen. The adult male and female were later described by Hewitt in 1923. The species has not been revised.
