= Idiops fryi =

Gauteng Idiops Trapdoor Spider

Conservation status
- Least Concern (SANBI Red List)

Scientific classification
- Kingdom: Animalia
- Phylum: Arthropoda
- Subphylum: Chelicerata
- Class: Arachnida
- Order: Araneae
- Infraorder: Mygalomorphae
- Family: Idiopidae
- Genus: Idiops
- Species: I. fryi

Binomial name
- Idiops fryi (Purcell, 1903)

Synonyms
- Acanthodon fryi Purcell, 1903

Species of spider

Idiops fryi is a species of spider in the family Idiopidae. It is endemic to South Africa and is commonly known as the Gauteng Idiops trapdoor spider.

== Distribution ==
Idiops fryi is recorded from three provinces in South Africa: Gauteng, Free State, and North West. The species occurs at altitudes ranging from 1,171 to 1,762 m above sea level.

== Habitat and ecology ==
The species inhabits the Grassland and Savanna biomes. It lives in silk-lined burrows closed with a trapdoor.

== Description ==
Idiops fryi is known only from females. The carapace is brown, paler mesially behind. The chelicerae are dark reddish. The legs are brown, with the tibiae, metatarsi, and tarsi of the anterior legs and the tibia and tarsus of the pedipalps darker. The abdomen is black, with the underside paler. Total length is 35 mm.

== Conservation ==
Idiops fryi is listed as Least Concern by the South African National Biodiversity Institute. The species is threatened by habitat loss to urban development and crop cultivation in parts of its range, but is protected in several nature reserves including Ezemvelo Nature Reserve, Roodeplaatdam Nature Reserve, Pilanesberg Nature Reserve, and Kgasmane Nature Reserve.

== Taxonomy ==
The species was originally described by William Frederick Purcell in 1903 as Acanthodon fryi from Johannesburg. The species has not been revised and more sampling is needed to collect males and determine the species' range.
