= Scalidognathus radialis =

Scientific classification
- Kingdom: Animalia
- Phylum: Arthropoda
- Subphylum: Chelicerata
- Class: Arachnida
- Order: Araneae
- Infraorder: Mygalomorphae
- Family: Idiopidae
- Genus: Scalidognathus
- Species: S. radialis

Binomial name
- Scalidognathus radialis (O. Pickard-Cambridge, 1869)

Species of spider

Scalidognathus radialis, is a species of spider of the genus Scalidognathus. It is endemic to Sri Lanka.
