= Idiops flaveolus =

Scientific classification
- Kingdom: Animalia
- Phylum: Arthropoda
- Subphylum: Chelicerata
- Class: Arachnida
- Order: Araneae
- Infraorder: Mygalomorphae
- Family: Idiopidae
- Genus: Idiops
- Species: I. flaveolus

Binomial name
- Idiops flaveolus (Pocock, 1901)

Synonyms
- Acanthodon flaveolum Pocock, 1901

Species of spider

Idiops flaveolus is a species of spider in the family Idiopidae. It is endemic to South Africa.

== Distribution ==
Idiops flaveolus is an Eastern Cape endemic recorded from Grahamstown and East London at altitudes ranging from 56 to 565 m above sea level.

== Habitat and ecology ==
The species inhabits the Thicket biome. It lives in silk-lined burrows closed with a trapdoor.

== Description ==
Idiops flaveolus is known from both sexes but has not been illustrated. The carapace and legs are orange-yellow-brown in colour and very sparingly furnished with hairs. The legs have a few fine spines. The abdomen is dark yellow-brown. The form of the cephalothorax is broadly but regularly oval, depressed above with fairly marked normal furrows and indentations. Total length is 19 mm.

== Conservation ==
Idiops flaveolus is listed as Data Deficient due to insufficient knowledge about its location, distribution and threats. More sampling is needed to determine the species' range.

== Taxonomy ==
The species was originally described by Reginald Innes Pocock in 1901 as Acanthodon flaveolum from Grahamstown, with the male described by Hewitt in 1918. The species has not been revised.
