= Idiops vandami =

Scientific classification
- Kingdom: Animalia
- Phylum: Arthropoda
- Subphylum: Chelicerata
- Class: Arachnida
- Order: Araneae
- Infraorder: Mygalomorphae
- Family: Idiopidae
- Genus: Idiops
- Species: I. vandami

Binomial name
- Idiops vandami (Hewitt, 1925)

Synonyms
- Acanthodon vandami Hewitt, 1925

Species of spider

Idiops vandami is a species of spider in the family Idiopidae. The family Idiopidae is the second most diverse mygalomorph family, represented by 23 genera and 452 species. It is endemic to South Africa.

== Distribution ==
Idiops vandami is a Mpumalanga endemic known only from the type locality Barberton at an altitude of 807 m above sea level.

== Habitat and ecology ==
The species inhabits the Savanna biome. It lives in silk-lined burrows closed with a trapdoor.

== Description ==
Idiops vandami is known from both sexes. The appendages are very pale brown, while the carapace is pale with a reddish tinge and the ocular region infuscated. The abdomen is purplish above with spinnerets almost white. Lower surfaces are pale, with some infuscation on the sternum.

== Conservation ==
Idiops vandami is listed as Data Deficient due to insufficient knowledge about its distribution and threats. The species is under-collected and more sampling is needed to determine its range.

== Taxonomy ==
The species was originally described by John Hewitt in 1925 as Acanthodon vandami from Barberton, at pages 279 with figures 1.4–5, based on both male and female specimens. The species has not been revised. Hewitt served as Director of the Albany Museum in Grahamstown from 1910 until his retirement in 1958.

The genus Acanthodon Guérin, 1838, under which the species was originally described, was synonymised with Idiops Perty, 1833 by O. Pickard-Cambridge in 1870. The genus Idiops is represented in South Africa by 23 species and one subspecies.
