= Idiops ochreolus =

Scientific classification
- Kingdom: Animalia
- Phylum: Arthropoda
- Subphylum: Chelicerata
- Class: Arachnida
- Order: Araneae
- Infraorder: Mygalomorphae
- Family: Idiopidae
- Genus: Idiops
- Species: I. ochreolus

Binomial name
- Idiops ochreolus (Pocock, 1902)

Synonyms
- Acanthodon ochreolum Pocock, 1902

Species of spider

Idiops ochreolus is a species of spider in the family Idiopidae. It is endemic to South Africa.

== Distribution ==
Idiops ochreolus is recorded from the Eastern Cape and Northern Cape. The species occurs at altitudes ranging from 444 to 1,378 m above sea level.

== Habitat and ecology ==
The species inhabits the Succulent Karoo biome. It lives in silk-lined burrows closed with a trapdoor.

== Description ==
Idiops ochreolus is known only from males. The carapace and legs are orange-yellow-brown in colour and very sparingly furnished with hairs. The legs have a few fine spines. The abdomen is dark yellow-brown. The form of the cephalothorax is broadly but regularly oval, depressed above with well-marked normal furrows and indentations.

== Conservation ==
Idiops ochreolus is listed as Data Deficient for taxonomic reasons. The species is under-sampled and more sampling is needed to collect females and determine the species' range.

== Taxonomy ==
The species was originally described by Reginald Innes Pocock in 1902 as Acanthodon ochreolum from Jansenville. It has not been revised but requires taxonomic work, as it has three pairs of sigilla and may need to be moved to Segregara.
