= Idiops thorelli =

Scientific classification
- Kingdom: Animalia
- Phylum: Arthropoda
- Subphylum: Chelicerata
- Class: Arachnida
- Order: Araneae
- Infraorder: Mygalomorphae
- Family: Idiopidae
- Genus: Idiops
- Species: I. thorelli

Binomial name
- Idiops thorelli O. Pickard-Cambridge, 1870

Species of spider

Idiops thorelli is a species of spider in the family Idiopidae. It is endemic to South Africa.

== Distribution ==
Idiops thorelli is known only from South Africa, but no exact locality is recorded for the type specimen.

== Habitat and ecology ==
The habitat and lifestyle of the species are unknown.

== Description ==
Idiops thorelli is known only from males. The carapace and legs are orange-yellow-brown in colour and very sparingly furnished with hairs. The legs have a few fine spines. The abdomen is dark yellow-brown. The form of the cephalothorax is broadly but regularly oval, depressed above with fairly marked normal furrows and indentations.

== Conservation ==
Idiops thorelli is listed as Data Deficient for taxonomic reasons. The type material needs to be located for redescription of the species before it can be properly sampled.

== Etymology ==
The species is named after Swedish arachnologist Tamerlan Thorell (1830–1901).

== Taxonomy ==
The species was described by Octavius Pickard-Cambridge in 1870 with the type locality given only as "South Africa". The species is known only from a single specimen collected prior to 1870. More sampling is needed to collect females and more males to determine the species' range.
