= Idiops kentanicus =

Scientific classification
- Kingdom: Animalia
- Phylum: Arthropoda
- Subphylum: Chelicerata
- Class: Arachnida
- Order: Araneae
- Infraorder: Mygalomorphae
- Family: Idiopidae
- Genus: Idiops
- Species: I. kentanicus

Binomial name
- Idiops kentanicus (Purcell, 1903)

Synonyms
- Acanthodon kentanicus Purcell, 1903; Ctenolophus kentanicus Purcell, 1904

Species of spider

Idiops kentanicus is a species of spider in the family Idiopidae. It is endemic to South Africa.

== Distribution ==
Idiops kentanicus is an Eastern Cape endemic known only from the type locality Kentani at an altitude of 485 m above sea level.

== Habitat and ecology ==
The species inhabits the Thicket biome. It lives in silk-lined burrows closed with a trapdoor. The female was collected from open ground under an Acacia tree. The burrow is only 45 mm deep and perfectly straight, wider below but becoming narrower near the opening, which is slightly oval. The lid is flat but not flexible, with the upper side very rough and uneven and the lower side smooth, flat and lined with white silk. The edge of the lid closes against the outspread rim of the tube-lining.

== Description ==
Idiops kentanicus is known from both sexes. The body is pale greenish ochraceus. Total length is 18 mm.

== Conservation ==
Idiops kentanicus is listed as Data Deficient due to insufficient knowledge about its distribution and threats. More sampling is needed.

== Taxonomy ==
The species was originally described by William Frederick Purcell in 1903 as Acanthodon kentanicus from Kentani. The species has not been revised.
