= Idiops hepburni =

Scientific classification
- Kingdom: Animalia
- Phylum: Arthropoda
- Subphylum: Chelicerata
- Class: Arachnida
- Order: Araneae
- Infraorder: Mygalomorphae
- Family: Idiopidae
- Genus: Idiops
- Species: I. hepburni

Binomial name
- Idiops hepburni (Hewitt, 1919)

Synonyms
- Acanthodon hepburni Hewitt, 1919

Species of spider

Idiops hepburni is a species of spider in the family Idiopidae. It occurs in South Africa and Lesotho.

== Distribution ==
Idiops hepburni is recorded from the Eastern Cape in South Africa and has also been sampled in Lesotho. The species occurs at altitudes ranging from 1,685 to 1,741 m above sea level.

== Habitat and ecology ==
The species inhabits the Grassland biome. It lives in silk-lined burrows closed with a trapdoor.

== Description ==
Idiops hepburni is known from both sexes. The carapace and appendages are yellowish brown, while the abdomen is superiorly slightly infuscated. Total length is 10 mm in males and 15 mm in females.

== Conservation ==
Idiops hepburni is listed as Data Deficient due to insufficient knowledge about its location, distribution and threats. The species is under-collected and more sampling is needed to determine its range.

== Taxonomy ==
The species was originally described by John Hewitt in 1919 as Acanthodon hepburni from Majuba Neck. The species has not been revised.
