= Heligmomerus =

Scientific classification
- Kingdom: Animalia
- Phylum: Arthropoda
- Subphylum: Chelicerata
- Class: Arachnida
- Order: Araneae
- Infraorder: Mygalomorphae
- Family: Idiopidae
- Genus: Heligmomerus; Simon, 1892

Type species
- H. taprobanicus Simon, 1892

Species
- 15, see text

Genus of spiders

Heligmomerus is a genus of armored trapdoor spiders that was first described by Eugène Simon in 1892.

== Distribution ==
Species in this genus are found in Africa, India and Sri Lanka.

== Life style ==
Nothing is known about their behavior.

=== Description ===
Body size ranges from 18 to 33 mm.

The upper surfaces are brownish-black to reddish-brown with the sternum and coxae of the third and fourth legs paler as well as the lung opercula and spinnerets. The eye area is short. The posterior row of eyes is straight to slightly procurved. The median eyes are almost round with their distance apart at least double their distance from the lateral eyes, which are obliquely oval and a little smaller than the anterior laterals.

The fovea is broad. The chelicerae are anteriorly narrowed with the cheliceral furrow having two rows of teeth. The sternum has four sigilla. The abdomen lacks an abdominal shield. The tibia III is excavated dorsally at the base, saddle-shaped with a bare patch posteriorly among rows of spinules.

=== Taxonomy ===
The African species have not been revised.

== Species ==
As of October 2025, this genus includes fifteen species:

- Heligmomerus astutus (Hewitt, 1915) – Zimbabwe
- Heligmomerus australis Khandekar, Thackeray, Pawar, Waghe & Gangalmale, 2025 – India
- Heligmomerus barkudensis (Gravely, 1921) – India
- Heligmomerus biharicus (Gravely, 1915) – India
- Heligmomerus caffer Purcell, 1903 – South Africa
- Heligmomerus carsoni Pocock, 1897 – Tanzania
- Heligmomerus deserti Pocock, 1901 – Botswana
- Heligmomerus garoensis (Tikader, 1977) – India
- Heligmomerus jagadishchandra Das, Pratihar, Khatun & Diksha, 2022 – India
- Heligmomerus jeanneli Berland, 1914 – Kenya
- Heligmomerus maximus Sanap & Mirza, 2015 – India
- Heligmomerus prostans Simon, 1892 – India
- Heligmomerus somalicus Pocock, 1896 – Somalia
- Heligmomerus taprobanicus Simon, 1892 – Sri Lanka (type species)
- Heligmomerus wii Siliwal, Hippargi, Yadav & Kumar, 2020 – India
