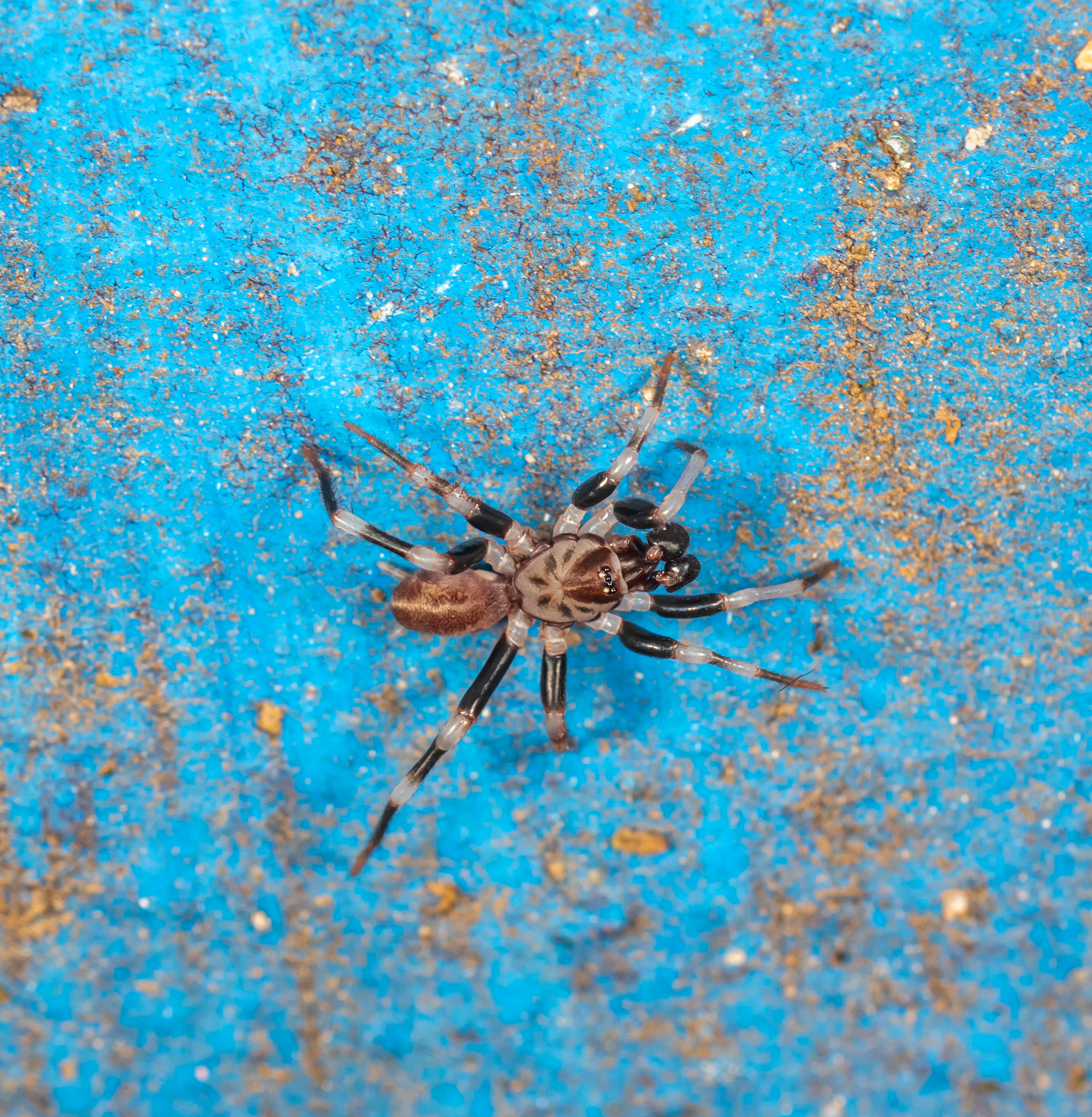
- N. coylei from Peru
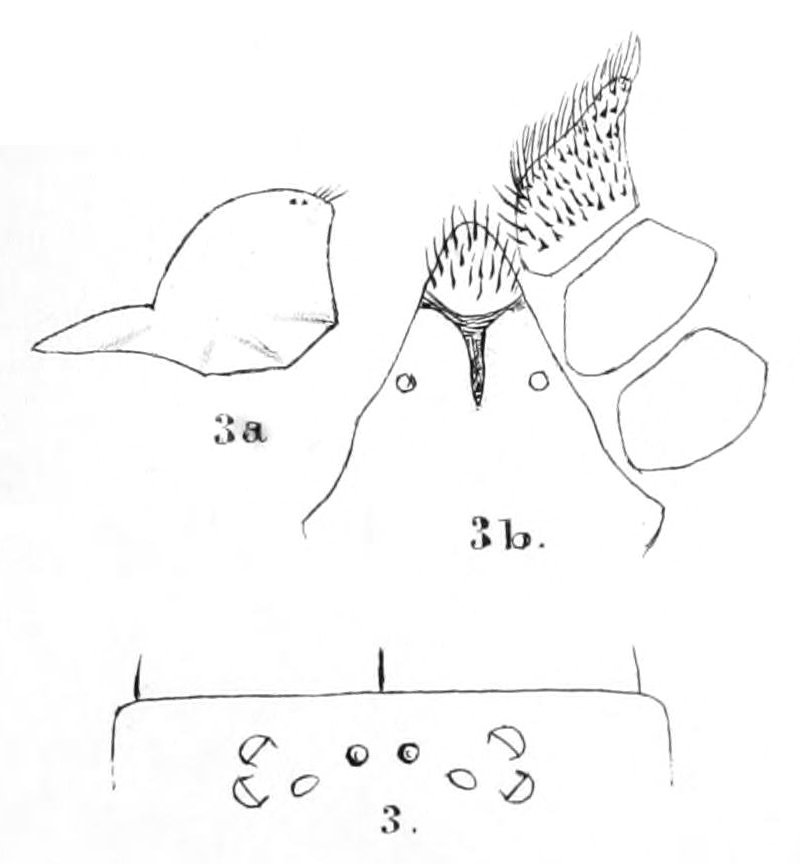
- Neocteniza sclateri Pocock, 1895. 3. Eyes. 3a. Side view of carapace. 3b. Labium and part of sternum.

Scientific classification
- Kingdom: Animalia
- Phylum: Arthropoda
- Subphylum: Chelicerata
- Class: Arachnida
- Order: Araneae
- Infraorder: Mygalomorphae
- Family: Idiopidae
- Genus: Neocteniza; Pocock, 1895

Type species
- N. sclateri Pocock, 1895

Species
- 18, see text

= Neocteniza =

Genus of spiders

Neocteniza is a genus of armored trapdoor spiders that was first described by Reginald Innes Pocock in 1895. Originally placed with the Actinopodidae, it was moved to the Idiopidae in 1985.

== Species ==
As of May 2019 it contains eighteen species found in Central and South America:

- Neocteniza agustinea Miranda & Arizala, 2013 – Panama
- Neocteniza australis Goloboff, 1987 – Brazil, Argentina
- Neocteniza chancani Goloboff & Platnick, 1992 – Argentina
- Neocteniza coylei Goloboff & Platnick, 1992 – Peru
- Neocteniza fantastica Platnick & Shadab, 1976 – Colombia
- Neocteniza malkini Platnick & Shadab, 1981 – Ecuador
- Neocteniza mexicana F. O. Pickard-Cambridge, 1897 – Guatemala
- Neocteniza minima Goloboff, 1987 – Bolivia, Argentina
- Neocteniza myriamae Bertani, Fukushima & Nagahama, 2006 – Brazil
- Neocteniza occulta Platnick & Shadab, 1981 – Panama
- Neocteniza osa Platnick & Shadab, 1976 – Costa Rica
- Neocteniza paucispina Platnick & Shadab, 1976 – Guatemala
- Neocteniza platnicki Goloboff, 1987 – Paraguay
- Neocteniza pococki Platnick & Shadab, 1976 – Venezuela
- Neocteniza sclateri Pocock, 1895 (type) – Guyana
- Neocteniza spinosa Goloboff, 1987 – Argentina
- Neocteniza subirana Platnick & Shadab, 1976 – Honduras
- Neocteniza toba Goloboff, 1987 – Paraguay, Argentina
