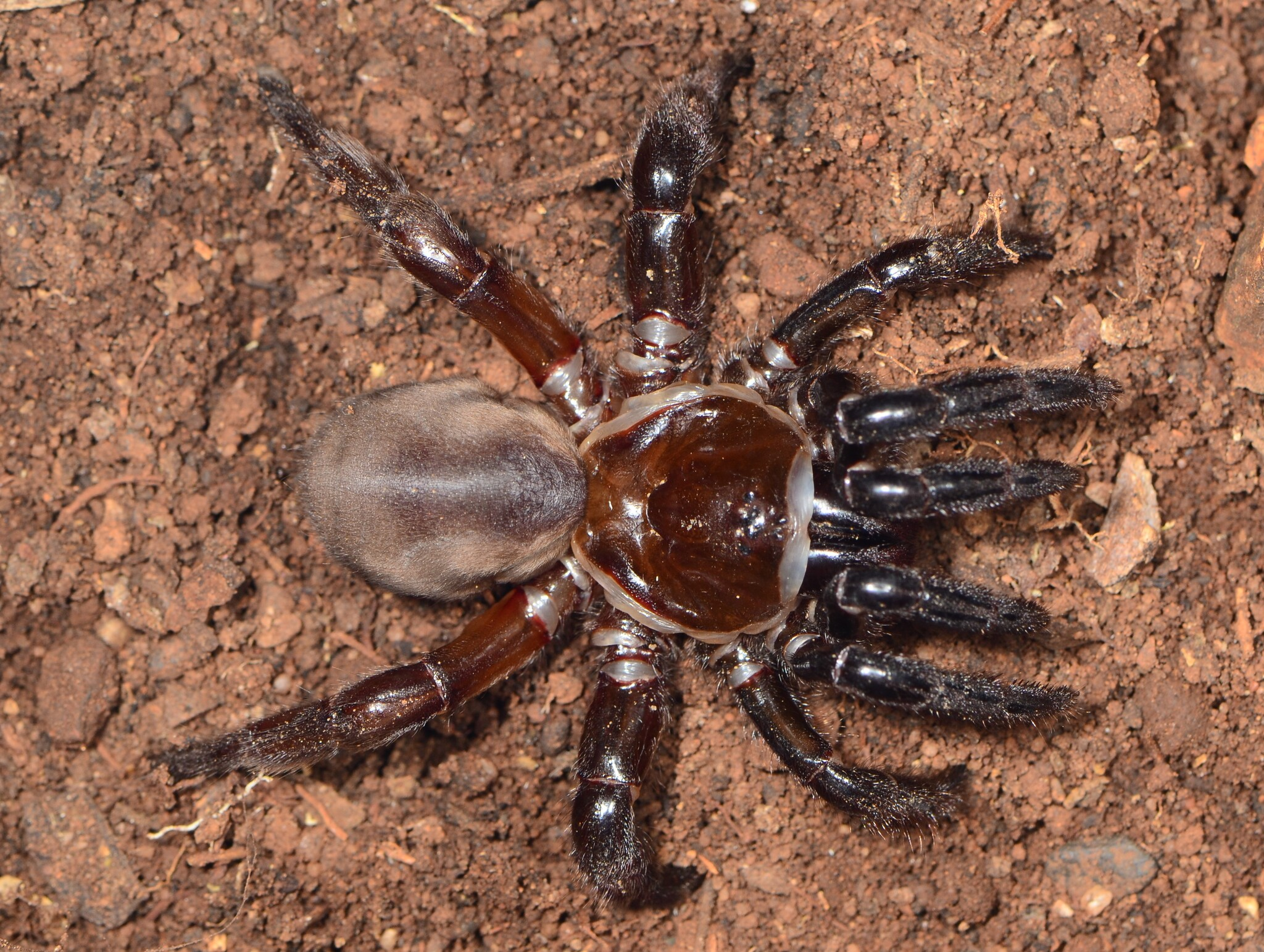
- Female
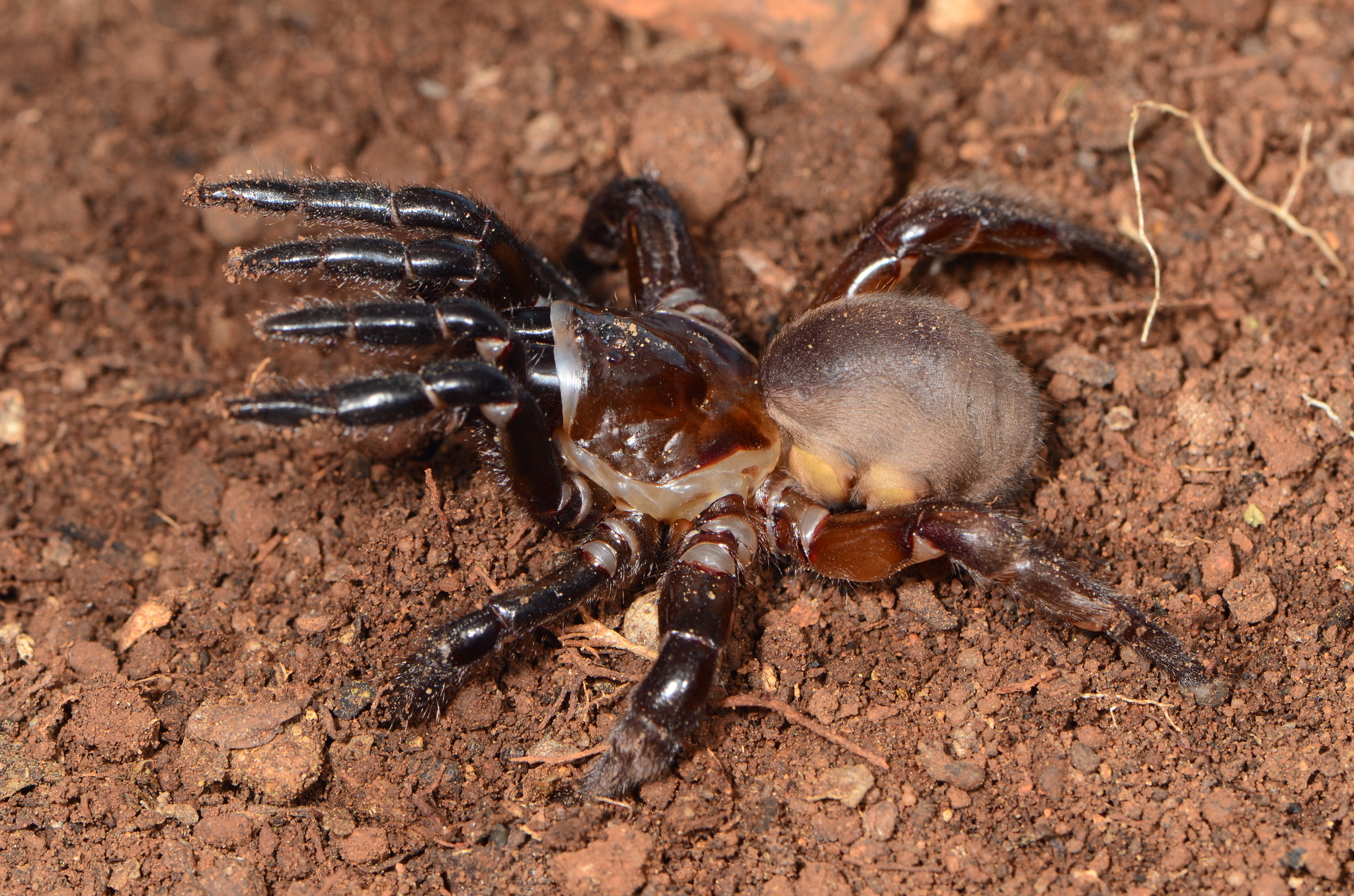
- Female

Scientific classification
- Kingdom: Animalia
- Phylum: Arthropoda
- Subphylum: Chelicerata
- Class: Arachnida
- Order: Araneae
- Infraorder: Mygalomorphae
- Family: Idiopidae
- Genus: Idiops
- Species: I. castaneus

Binomial name
- Idiops castaneus Hewitt, 1913

= Idiops castaneus =

Newington Idiops Trapdoor Spider

Species of spider

Idiops castaneus is a species of spider in the family Idiopidae. It is endemic to South Africa and is commonly known as the newington idiops trapdoor spider.

== Distribution ==
Idiops castaneus is recorded from two provinces in South Africa: Limpopo and Mpumalanga. Notable locations include Kruger National Park, Lhuvhondo Nature Reserve, and Blouberg Nature Reserve. The species occurs at altitudes ranging from 345 to 1,411 m above sea level.

== Habitat and ecology ==
The species inhabits the Savanna biome. It lives in silk-lined burrows closed with a trapdoor.

== Description ==
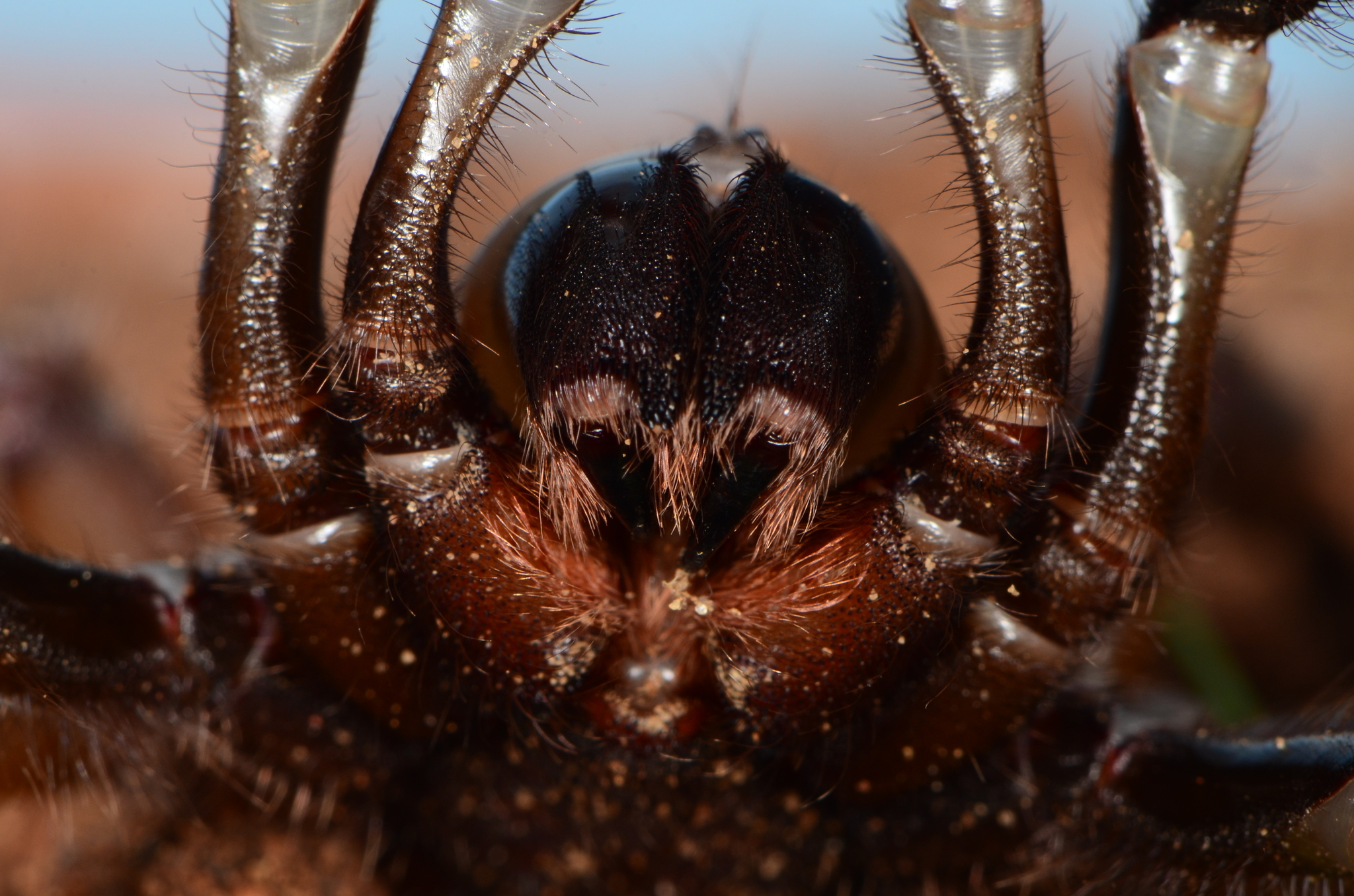
front view

Idiops castaneus is known only from females. The carapace and legs are dark chestnut brown, with the more anterior appendages almost blackish. The femur of the fourth leg is dark above, but lower surfaces and more distal parts of the leg are pale brown. The abdomen is fuscous. The labium bears six apical teeth arranged in two rows.

== Conservation ==
Idiops castaneus is listed as Least Concern by the South African National Biodiversity Institute due to its wide geographical range. The species is protected in several nature reserves including Blouberg Nature Reserve, Lhuvhondo Nature Reserve, and Kruger National Park.

== Taxonomy ==
The species was originally described by John Hewitt in 1913 from Newington in Mpumalanga. The species has not been revised and requires further taxonomic study, particularly to locate male specimens.
