= Prothemenops =

Scientific classification
- Kingdom: Animalia
- Phylum: Arthropoda
- Subphylum: Chelicerata
- Class: Arachnida
- Order: Araneae
- Infraorder: Mygalomorphae
- Family: Idiopidae
- Genus: Prothemenops; Schwendinger, 1991

Type species
- P. siamensis Schwendinger, 1991

Species
- 4, see text

Genus of spiders

Prothemenops is a genus of Southeast Asian armored trapdoor spiders that was first described by Peter J. Schwendinger in 1991.

== Species ==
As of May 2019 it contains four species from Thailand, and at least a dozen more suspected species found in Thailand, Laos, and Cambodia:

- Prothemenops irineae Schwendinger & Hongpadharakiree, 2014 – Thailand
- Prothemenops khirikhan Schwendinger & Hongpadharakiree, 2014 – Thailand
- Prothemenops phanthurat Schwendinger & Hongpadharakiree, 2014 – Thailand
- Prothemenops siamensis Schwendinger, 1991 (type) – Thailand
