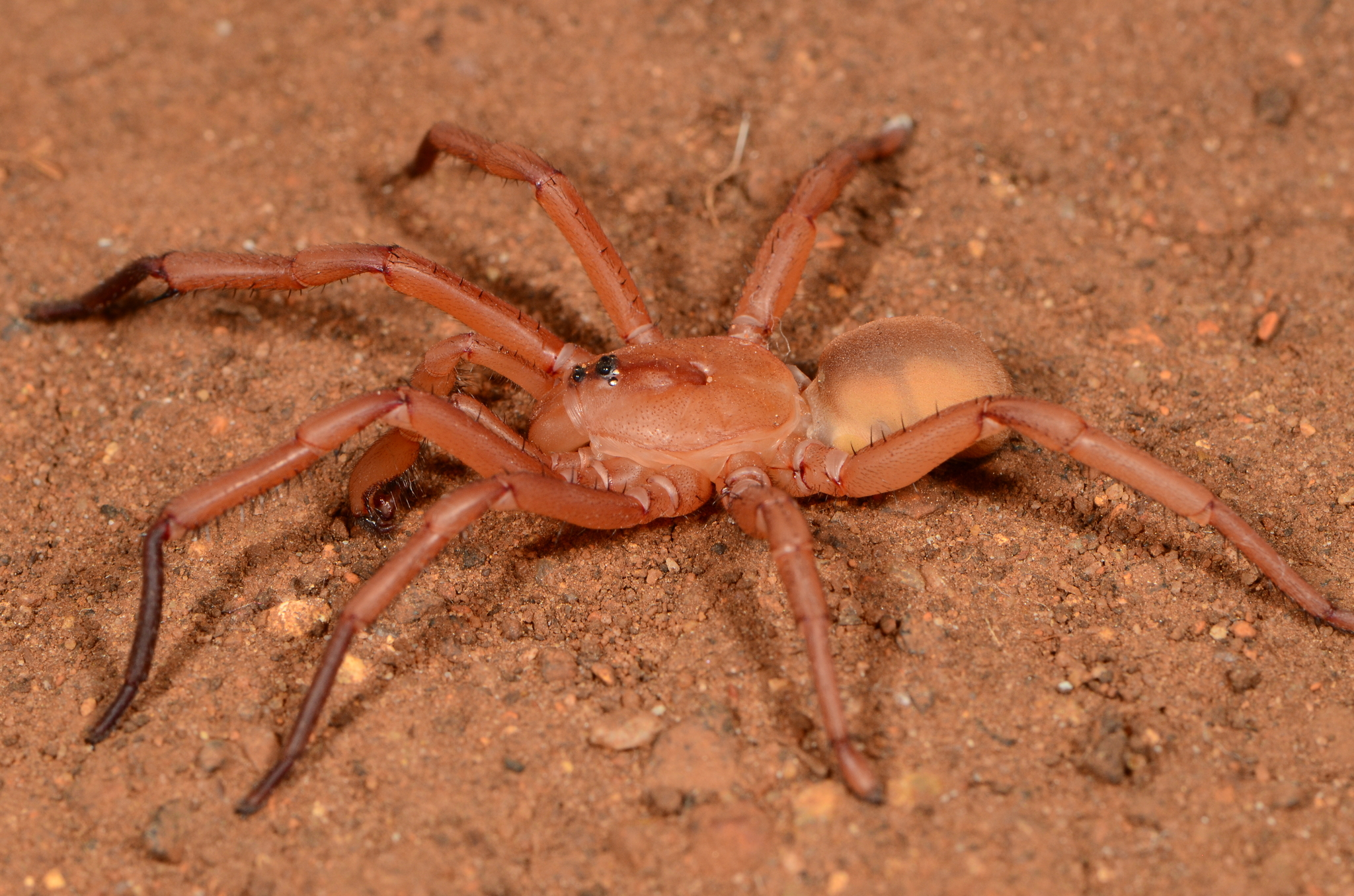
- Male
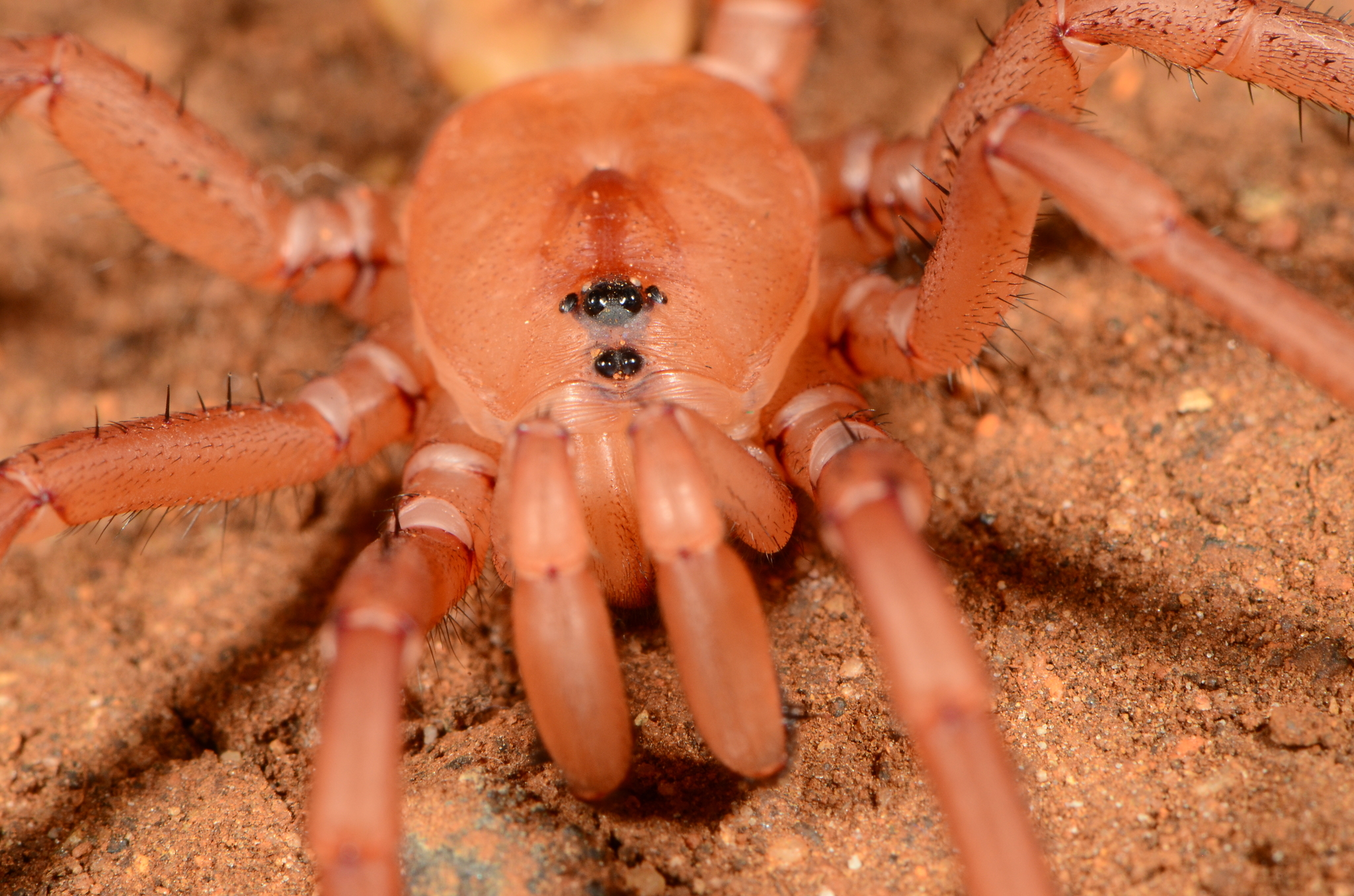
- Male

Scientific classification
- Kingdom: Animalia
- Phylum: Arthropoda
- Subphylum: Chelicerata
- Class: Arachnida
- Order: Araneae
- Infraorder: Mygalomorphae
- Family: Idiopidae
- Genus: Idiops
- Species: I. sylvestris

Binomial name
- Idiops sylvestris (Hewitt, 1925)

Synonyms
- Acanthodon sylvestris Hewitt, 1925; Acanthodon silvestris Bonnet, 1955

= Idiops sylvestris =

Sylvestri Idiops Trapdoor Spider

Species of spider

Idiops sylvestris is a species of spider in the family Idiopidae. It is endemic to South Africa and is commonly known as the Sylvestri Idiops trapdoor spider.

== Distribution ==
Idiops sylvestris is recorded from Limpopo and the Free State at an altitude of 860 m above sea level.

== Habitat and ecology ==
The species inhabits the Savanna and Grassland biomes. It lives in silk-lined burrows closed with a trapdoor. Research has shown that average minimum daily temperature has a significant effect on the activity pattern of the species, while rainfall has a weak effect. The species is active from late summer (mid-February) to the middle of autumn (late April).

== Description ==
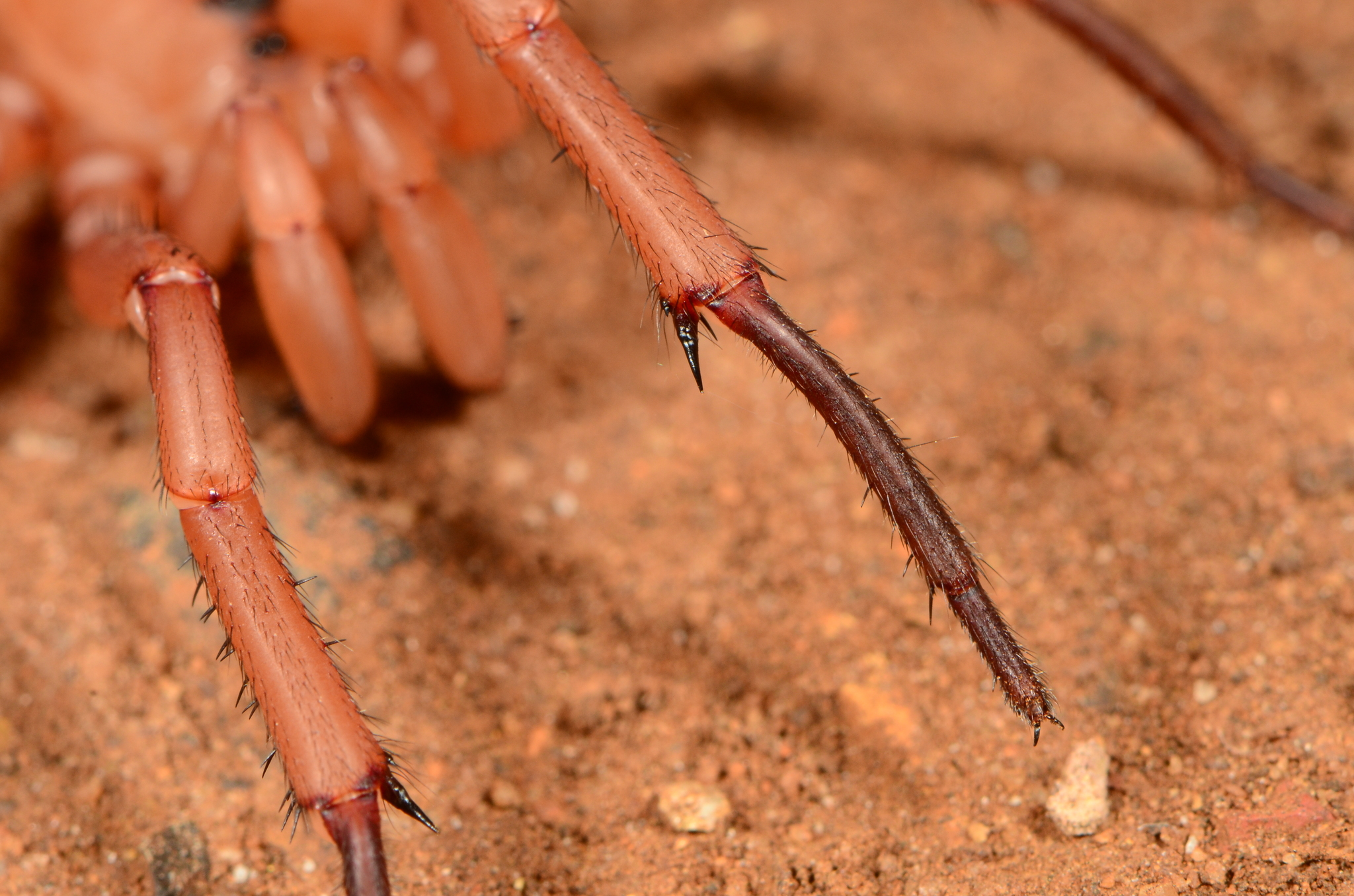
Leg of male

Idiops sylvestris is known only from males. The carapace and appendages are dark brown above, with the tarsus and metatarsus of legs I and II paler. The abdomen is blackish brown. Lower surfaces of appendages are olive, while the sternum, genital region, lung operculae, and spinnerets are yellowish.

== Conservation ==
Idiops sylvestris is listed as Data Deficient for taxonomic reasons. The species is partly protected in the Free State National Botanical Garden.

== Etymology ==
The species name means "living in forests" in Latin.

== Taxonomy ==
The species was originally described by John Hewitt in 1925 as Acanthodon sylvestris from Woodbush Forest, Limpopo. The species has not been revised but requires taxonomic work, as it has three pairs of sigilla and may need to be moved to Segregara.
