= Scalidognathus =

Scientific classification
- Kingdom: Animalia
- Phylum: Arthropoda
- Subphylum: Chelicerata
- Class: Arachnida
- Order: Araneae
- Infraorder: Mygalomorphae
- Family: Idiopidae
- Genus: Scalidognathus; Karsch, 1892

Type species
- S. radialis (O. Pickard-Cambridge, 1869)

Species
- 6, see text

Synonyms
- Nemesiellus Pocock, 1900

Genus of spiders

Scalidognathus is a genus of Asian armored trapdoor spiders that was first described by Ferdinand Anton Franz Karsch in 1892. Originally placed with the Ctenizidae, it was moved to the Idiopidae in 1985.

== Species ==
As of May 2019 it contains six species:

- Scalidognathus montanus (Pocock, 1900) – India
- Scalidognathus nigriaraneus Sanap & Mirza, 2011 – India
- Scalidognathus oreophilus Simon, 1892 – Sri Lanka
- Scalidognathus radialis (O. Pickard-Cambridge, 1869) (type) – Sri Lanka
- Scalidognathus seticeps Karsch, 1892 – Sri Lanka
- Scalidognathus tigerinus Sanap & Mirza, 2011 – India

== See also ==
- List of spiders of India
