= Idiops grandis =

Scientific classification
- Kingdom: Animalia
- Phylum: Arthropoda
- Subphylum: Chelicerata
- Class: Arachnida
- Order: Araneae
- Infraorder: Mygalomorphae
- Family: Idiopidae
- Genus: Idiops
- Species: I. grandis

Binomial name
- Idiops grandis (Hewitt, 1915)

Synonyms
- Acanthodon grandis Hewitt, 1915

Species of spider

Idiops grandis is a species of spider in the family Idiopidae. It is endemic to South Africa.

== Distribution ==
Idiops grandis is a KwaZulu-Natal endemic recorded from Ndumo Game Reserve and Umfolozi Nature Reserve at altitudes ranging from 47 to 232 m above sea level.

== Habitat and ecology ==
The species inhabits the Savanna biome. It lives in silk-lined burrows closed with a trapdoor.

== Description ==
Idiops grandis is known only from females. The upper surfaces of appendages and carapace are castaneous, with the legs having a reddish tinge. Ventral surfaces are paler with the sternum and coxae of the last two pairs of legs being yellowish brown. The coxa is clothed inferiorly with stout bristles, not spinules.

== Conservation ==
Idiops grandis is listed as Data Deficient for taxonomic reasons. The species is protected in Ndumo Game Reserve.

== Taxonomy ==
The species was originally described by John Hewitt in 1915 as Acanthodon grandis from Umfolozi. The species has not been revised and requires taxonomic work, as it has three pairs of sigilla and may need to be moved to Segregara.
