= Titanidiops =

Scientific classification
- Kingdom: Animalia
- Phylum: Arthropoda
- Subphylum: Chelicerata
- Class: Arachnida
- Order: Araneae
- Infraorder: Mygalomorphae
- Family: Idiopidae
- Genus: Titanidiops; Simon, 1903

Type species
- T. compactus (Gerstäcker, 1873)

Species
- See text.

Genus of spiders

Titanidiops is a genus of armored trapdoor spiders.

It was first described by Eugène Louis Simon in 1903.

== Species ==
As of February 2026, the World Spider Catalog accepted the following species:

- Titanidiops birmanicus Schwendinger & Huber, 2024 – Myanmar
- Titanidiops bombayensis (Siliwal, Molur & Biswas, 2005) – India
- Titanidiops bonny (Siliwal, Hippargi, Yadav & Kumar, 2020) – India
- Titanidiops briodae Schenkel, 1937 – Zimbabwe
- Titanidiops canariensis Wunderlich, 1992 – Canary Is.
- Titanidiops compactus (Gerstaecker, 1873) – Kenya
- Titanidiops constructor (Pocock, 1900) – India
- Titanidiops crassus (Simon, 1884) – Myanmar
- Titanidiops fortis (Pocock, 1900) – India
- Titanidiops inermis Schwendinger, 2024 – Thailand
- Titanidiops insularis Schwendinger, 2024 – Thailand, Indonesia (Belitung)
- Titanidiops joida (Gupta, Das & Siliwal, 2013) – India
- Titanidiops kolhapurensis Gangalmale, Thackeray, Khandekar & Gaikwad, 2026 – India
- Titanidiops lacustris (Pocock, 1897) – Tanzania
- Titanidiops logunovi Bariev & Sherwood, 2025 – Sudan
- Titanidiops maroccanus Simon, 1909 – Morocco
- Titanidiops medini (Pratihar & Das, 2020) – India
- Titanidiops melloleitaoi Caporiacco, 1949 – Kenya
- Titanidiops nilagiri (Das & Diksha, 2019) – India
- Titanidiops oriya (Siliwal, 2013) – India
- Titanidiops pylorus (Schwendinger, 1991) – Thailand
- Titanidiops robustus (Pocock, 1898) – Kenya
- Titanidiops sayamensis Schwendinger & Hongpadharakiree, 2024 – Myanmar, Thailand
- Titanidiops syriacus (O. Pickard-Cambridge, 1870) – Syria, Israel
- Titanidiops tenuis Schwendinger, 2024 – Myanmar
- Titanidiops vankhede (Siliwal, Hippargi, Yadav & Kumar, 2020) – India
- Titanidiops yemenensis (Simon, 1890) – Yemen
