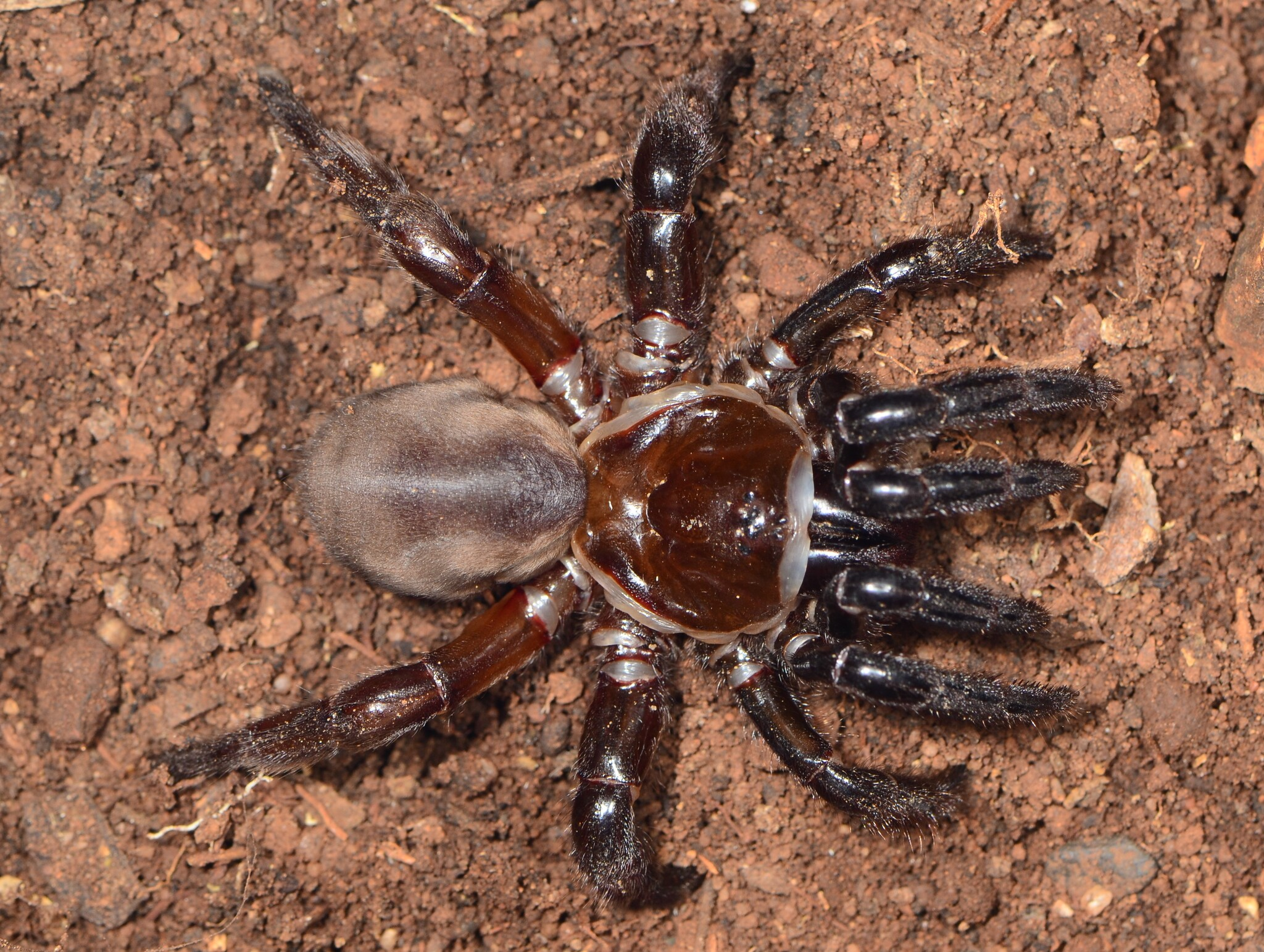
- Female I. castaneus
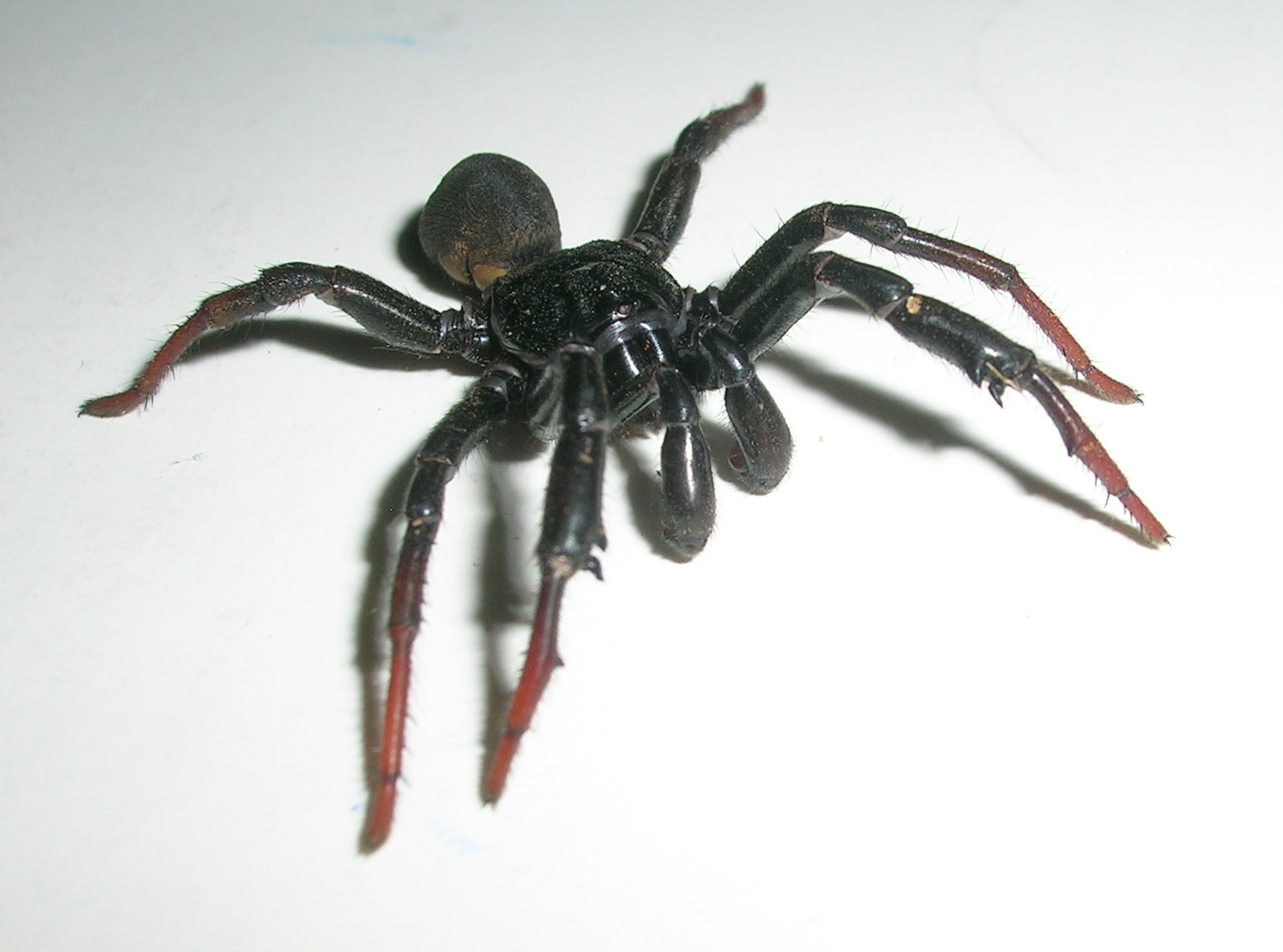
- Male Idiops constructor in India

Scientific classification
- Kingdom: Animalia
- Phylum: Arthropoda
- Subphylum: Chelicerata
- Class: Arachnida
- Order: Araneae
- Infraorder: Mygalomorphae
- Family: Idiopidae
- Genus: Idiops; Perty, 1833

Type species
- I. fuscus Perty, 1833

Species
- 96, see text

Synonyms
- Acanthodon Guérin, 1838; Dendricon Octavius Pickard-Cambridge; O. Pickard-Cambridge, 1889 Juambeltzia; Cândido Firmino de Mello-Leitão Mello-Leitão, 1946; Pseudidiops Eugène Simon; Simon, 1889

= Idiops =

Front-eyed trapdoor spiders

Genus of spiders

Idiops is a genus of armored trapdoor spiders that was first described by Josef Anton Maximilian Perty in 1833. It is the type genus of the spurred trapdoor spiders, Idiopidae. Idiops is also the most species-rich genus of the family, and is found at widely separated locations in the Neotropics, Afrotropics, Indomalaya and the Middle East.

== Distribution ==
Species of this genus are found in South America, Africa, South Asia and the Middle East.

== Description ==
Females live in tubular burrows lined with a thick layer of white silk. These typically have a D-shaped lid that fits into the entrance like a cork, and some burrows have two entrances. The lid may consist of mud, moss or lichen, which is bound below by a thick layer of silk. As in all genera of this family, the anterior lateral eyes (ALE) are situated near the clypeal margin, far in front of the remaining six eyes, which are arranged in a tight group. The males which are smaller in size, wander about or occasionally live in burrows.

Body size ranges from 10 to 35 mm. The carapace is narrower posteriorly. The posterior eye row is procurved, and the median ocular area is widest posteriorly. The cheliceral fang furrows have equal rows of teeth along inner and outer margins. The sternum has only two pairs of sigilla marginally. The legs have coxae without spinules. The chelicerae are narrow, especially in males.

== Life style ==
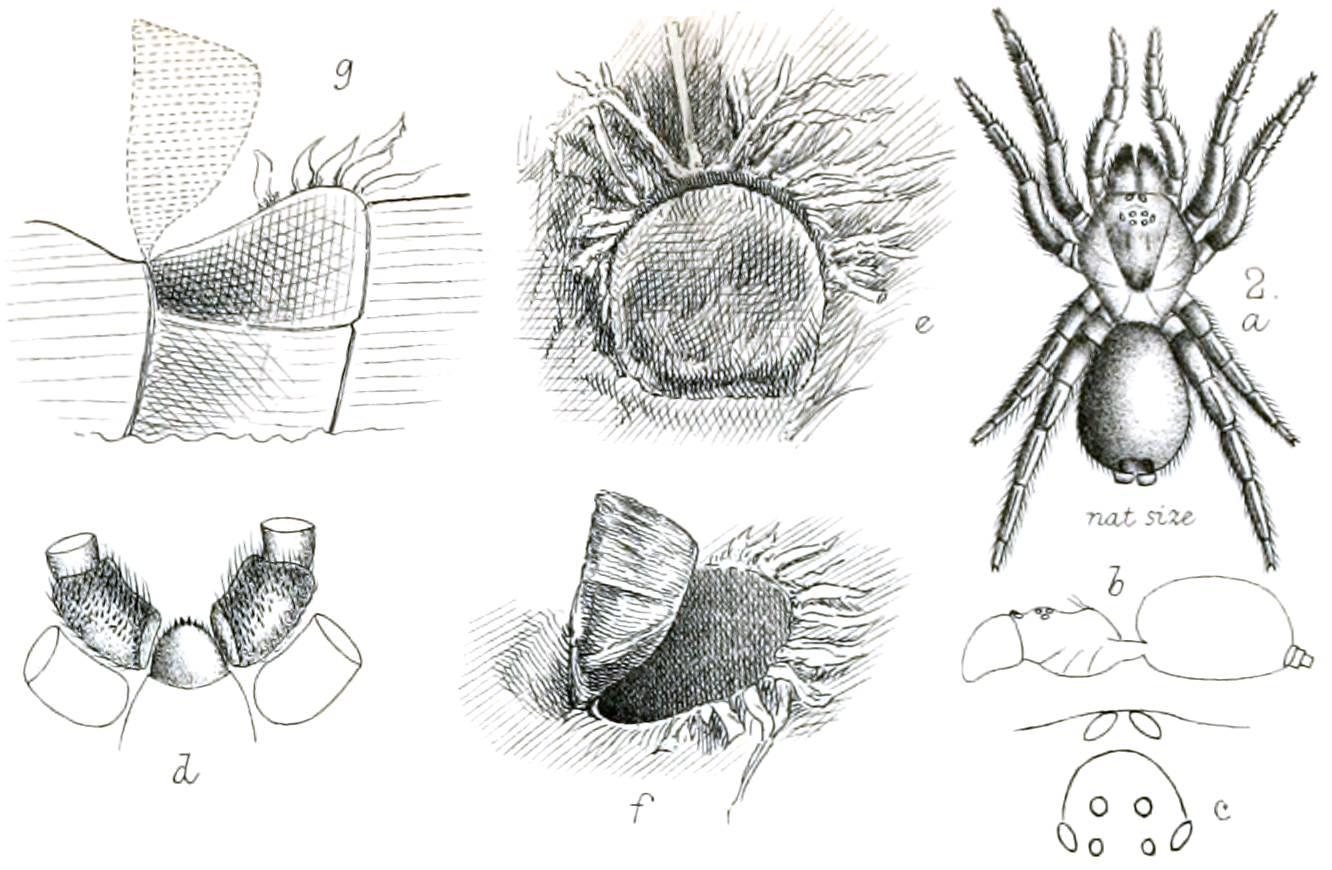
I. crassus and its trapdoor nest entrance

The burrows of Idiops are usually made in soil free of stones, which is soft during the rainy season but becomes very hard afterwards. The burrows are frequently made in open grassy plains with a gentle slope with low scrubs. The entrances are usually closed with a trapdoor that varies from cork-like to flat. The trapdoor has an outer surface that is well-camouflaged. It could be sand grains firmly stuck together so that it resembles the surface of the surrounding soil, grass tufts, or even dry black lichen.

Members of Idiops have been collected on various occasions in areas with high populations of the termite Hodotermes mossambicus. The males are frequently collected from pit traps.

Like other mygalomorphs, they are relatively large and long-lived. Forest clearance and agricultural practices that loosen the soil and enhance erosion, besides soil removal for brick making have been pointed out as serious threats to some Indian species. Species ranges are poorly known – in India for instance, most species are known only from their type localities.

== Species ==
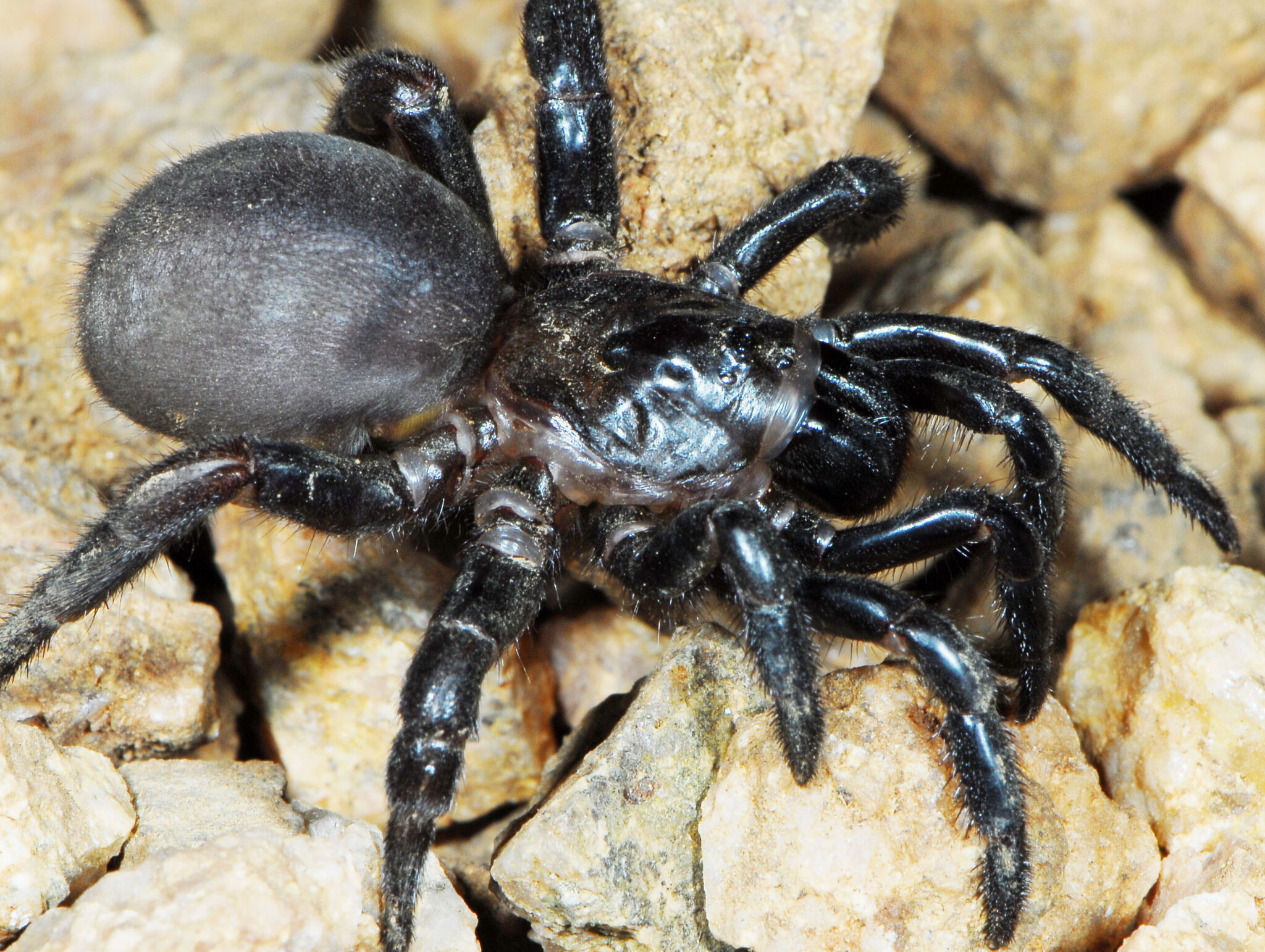
female I. gunningi

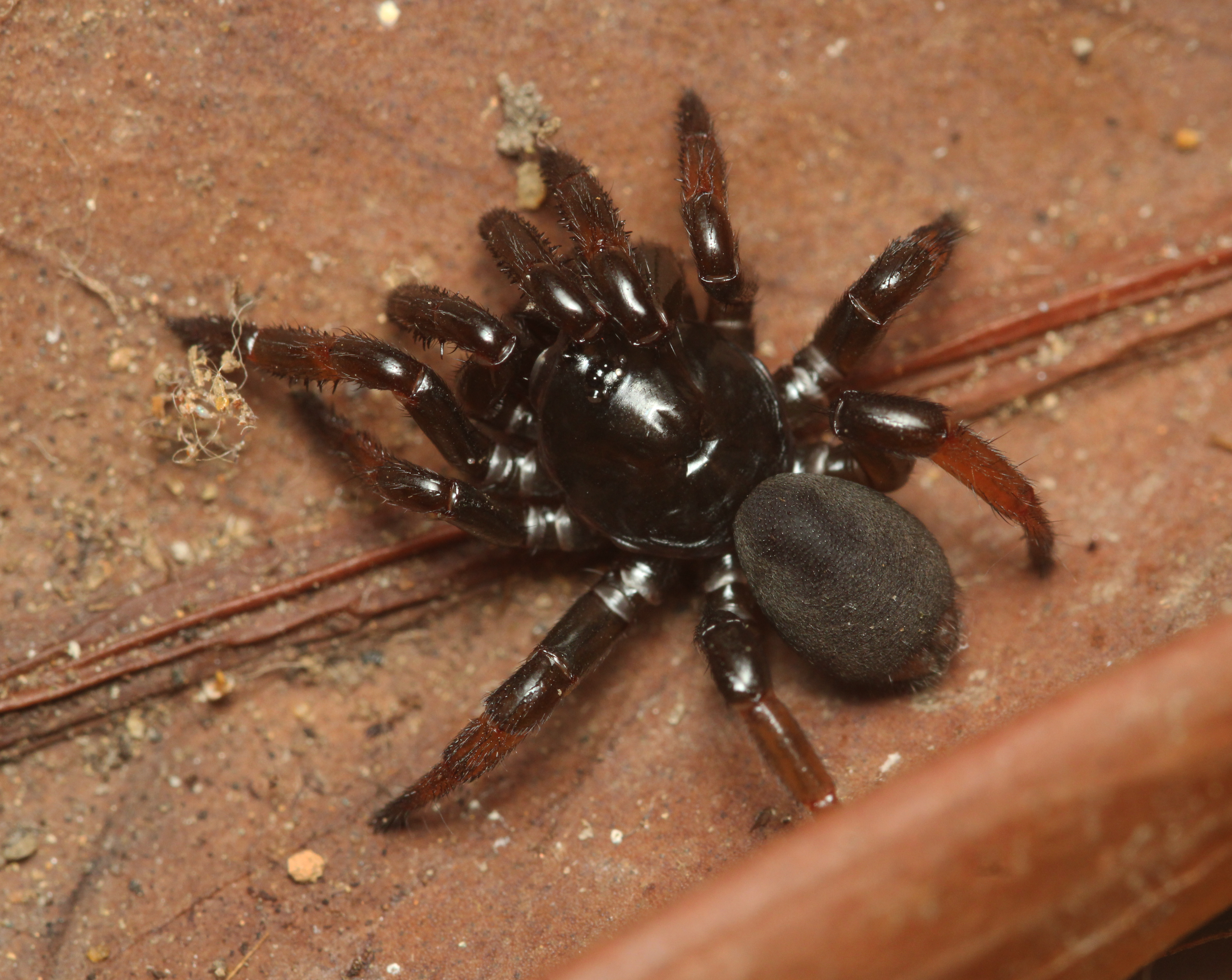
I. opifex

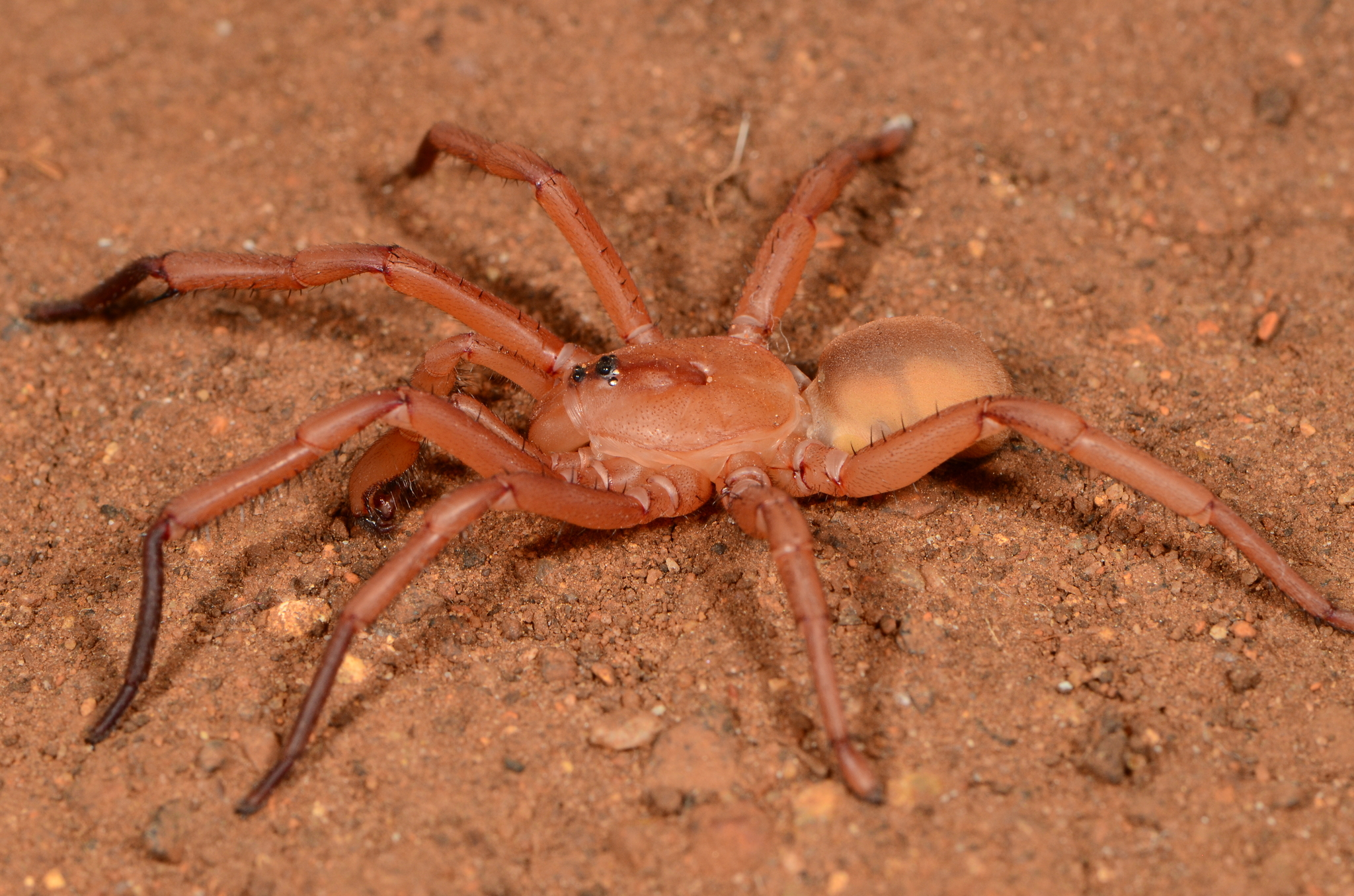
male I. sylvestris

As of October 2025, this genus includes 86 species and one subspecies:

- Idiops angusticeps (Pocock, 1900) – Equatorial Guinea
- Idiops argus Simon, 1889 – Venezuela
- Idiops arnoldi Hewitt, 1914 – Zimbabwe
- Idiops aussereri Simon, 1877 – Angola
- Idiops bonapartei van Hasselt, 1888 – Suriname
- Idiops cambridgei Ausserer, 1875 – Colombia
- Idiops camelus (Mello-Leitão, 1937) – Brazil
- Idiops carajas Fonseca-Ferreira, Zampaulo & Guadanucci, 2017 – Brazil
- Idiops castaneus Hewitt, 1913 – South Africa
- Idiops clarus (Mello-Leitão, 1946) – Uruguay, Argentina
- Idiops clepsydra Dupérré & Tapia, 2025 – Ecuador
- Idiops crudeni (Hewitt, 1914) – South Africa
- Idiops curvicalcar Roewer, 1953 – DR Congo
- Idiops curvipes (Thorell, 1899) – Cameroon
- Idiops damarensis Hewitt, 1934 – Namibia
- Idiops designatus O. Pickard-Cambridge, 1885 – Pakistan
- Idiops dilatatus Gomes, dos Santos, Almeida, Cipola & de Morais, 2024 – Brazil
- Idiops duocordibus Fonseca-Ferreira, Guadanucci & Brescovit, 2021 – Brazil
- Idiops fageli Roewer, 1953 – DR Congo
- Idiops flaveolus (Pocock, 1901) – South Africa
- Idiops fossor (Pocock, 1900) – India
- Idiops fryi (Purcell, 1903) – South Africa
- Idiops fulvipes Simon, 1889 – Venezuela
- Idiops fuscus Perty, 1833 – Brazil (type species)
- Idiops gerhardti Hewitt, 1913 – South Africa
- Idiops germaini Simon, 1892 – Brazil
- Idiops gracilipes (Hewitt, 1919) – South Africa
- Idiops grandis (Hewitt, 1915) – South Africa
- Idiops gunningi Hewitt, 1913 – South Africa
  - I. g. elongatus Hewitt, 1915 – South Africa
- Idiops guri Fonseca-Ferreira, Guadanucci & Brescovit, 2021 – Brazil
- Idiops hamiltoni (Pocock, 1902) – South Africa
- Idiops harti (Pocock, 1893) – Trinidad and Tobago
- Idiops hepburni (Hewitt, 1919) – South Africa, Lesotho
- Idiops hirsutipedis Mello-Leitão, 1941 – Argentina
- Idiops hirsutus (Hewitt, 1919) – South Africa
- Idiops kaasensis Mirza, Vaze & Sanap, 2012 – India
- Idiops kanonganus Roewer, 1953 – DR Congo
- Idiops kaperonis Roewer, 1953 – DR Congo
- Idiops kazibius Roewer, 1953 – DR Congo
- Idiops kentanicus (Purcell, 1903) – South Africa
- Idiops lusingius Roewer, 1953 – DR Congo
- Idiops madrasensis (Tikader, 1977) – India
- Idiops mafae Lawrence, 1927 – Namibia
- Idiops meadei O. Pickard-Cambridge, 1870 – Uganda
- Idiops mettupalayam Ganeshkumar & Siliwal, 2013 – India
- Idiops microps (Hewitt, 1913) – South Africa
- Idiops minguito Ferretti, 2017 – Argentina
- Idiops mocambo Fonseca-Ferreira, Guadanucci & Brescovit, 2021 – Brazil
- Idiops monticola (Hewitt, 1916) – South Africa
- Idiops monticoloides (Hewitt, 1919) – South Africa
- Idiops mossambicus (Hewitt, 1919) – Mozambique, South Africa
- Idiops munois Roewer, 1953 – DR Congo
- Idiops nigropilosus (Hewitt, 1919) – South Africa
- Idiops nilopolensis Mello-Leitão, 1923 – Brazil
- Idiops ochreolus (Pocock, 1902) – South Africa
- Idiops opifex (Simon, 1889) – French Guiana
- Idiops palapyi Tucker, 1917 – Botswana
- Idiops pallidipes Purcell, 1908 – Namibia
- Idiops parvus Hewitt, 1915 – South Africa
- Idiops petiti (Guérin, 1838) – Brazil
- Idiops piluso Ferretti, Nime & Mattoni, 2017 – Argentina
- Idiops pirassununguensis Fukami & Lucas, 2005 – Brazil
- Idiops prescotti Schenkel, 1937 – Tanzania
- Idiops pretoriae (Pocock, 1898) – South Africa
- Idiops pulcher Hewitt, 1914 – South Africa
- Idiops pulloides Hewitt, 1919 – South Africa
- Idiops pullus Tucker, 1917 – South Africa
- Idiops pungwensis Purcell, 1904 – South Africa
- Idiops rastratus (O. Pickard-Cambridge, 1889) – Brazil
- Idiops reshma Siliwal, Hippargi, Yadav & Kumar, 2020 – India
- Idiops rohdei Karsch, 1886 – Paraguay
- Idiops royi Roewer, 1961 – Senegal
- Idiops rubrolimbatus Mirza & Sanap, 2012 – India
- Idiops sally Siliwal, Hippargi, Yadav & Kumar, 2020 – India
- Idiops schenkeli Lessert, 1938 – DR Congo
- Idiops sertania Fonseca-Ferreira, Guadanucci & Brescovit, 2021 – Brazil
- Idiops siolii (Bücherl, 1953) – Brazil
- Idiops straeleni Roewer, 1953 – DR Congo
- Idiops striatipes Purcell, 1908 – Botswana
- Idiops sylvestris (Hewitt, 1925) – South Africa
- Idiops thorelli O. Pickard-Cambridge, 1870 – South Africa
- Idiops tolengo Ferretti, 2017 – Argentina
- Idiops upembensis Roewer, 1953 – DR Congo
- Idiops vandami (Hewitt, 1925) – South Africa
- Idiops versicolor (Purcell, 1903) – South Africa
- Idiops wittei Roewer, 1953 – DR Congo
