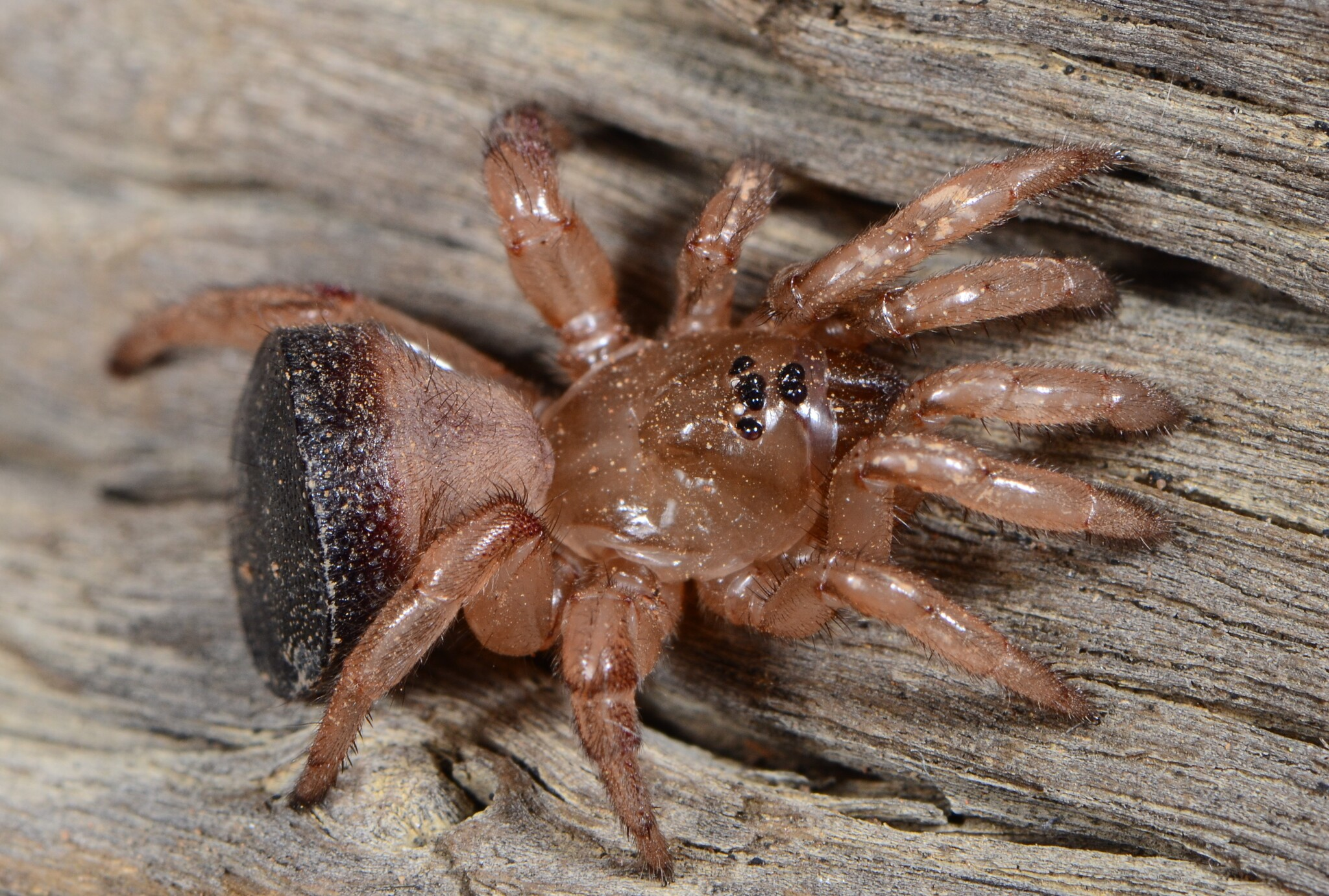
- Female Galeosoma planiscutatum
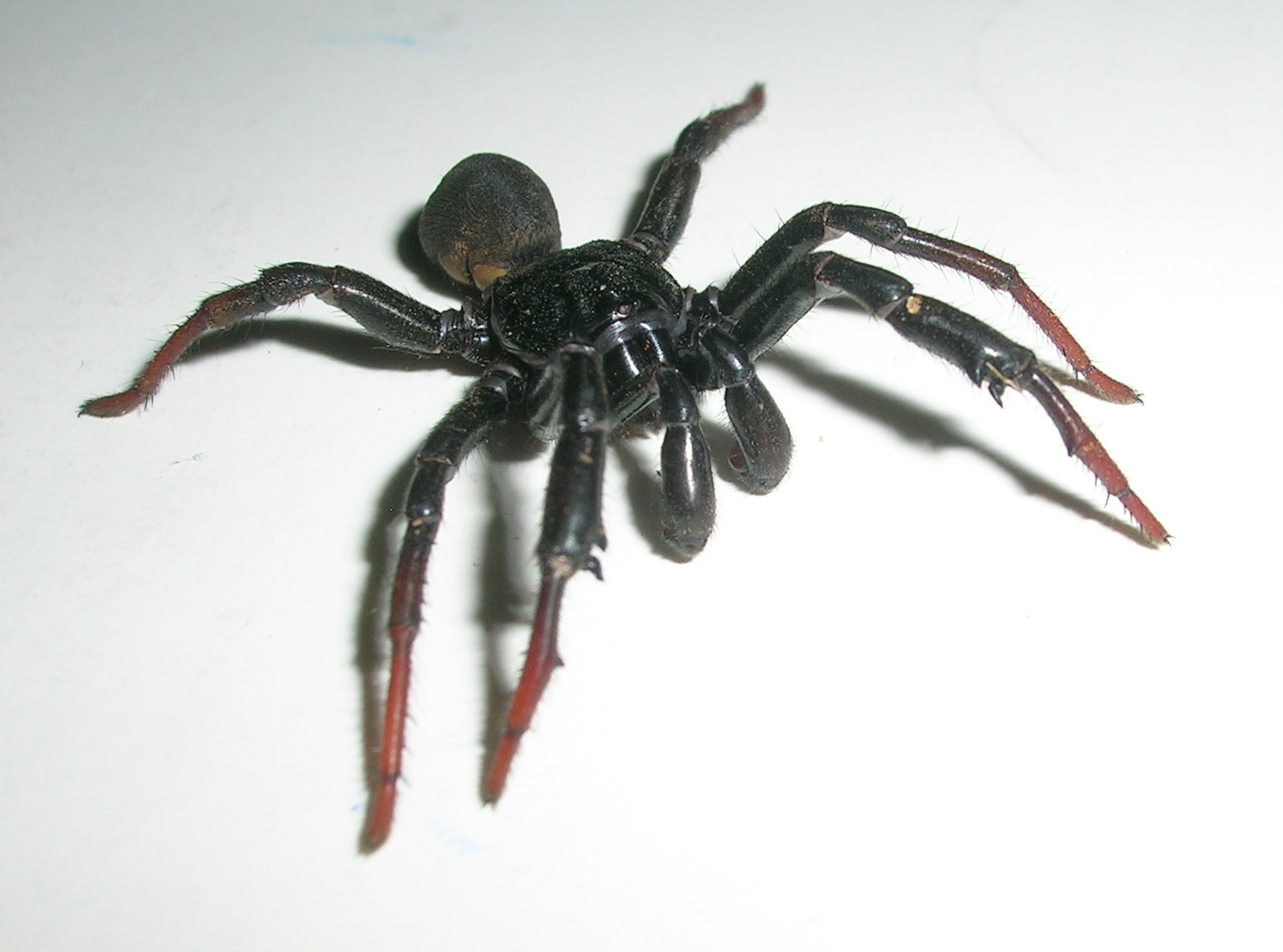
- Male Idiops constructor

Scientific classification
- Kingdom: Animalia
- Phylum: Arthropoda
- Subphylum: Chelicerata
- Class: Arachnida
- Order: Araneae
- Infraorder: Mygalomorphae
- Clade: Avicularioidea
- Family: Idiopidae; Simon, 1889

Diversity
- 23 genera, 451 species
- blue: reported countries (WSC)

= Idiopidae =

Armored trapdoor spiders

Family of spiders

Idiopidae, also known as armored or spiny trapdoor spiders, is a family of mygalomorph spiders first described by Eugène Simon in 1889.

== Behaviour ==
Idiopidae build burrows, and some species close these with a trapdoor lined with silk. Prothemenops siamensis from Thailand, which is about 2 cm long, builds its retreat in a streamside vertical earth bank in lower montane rainforest. Each burrow has two or three entrances that lead into a main tube. The trapdoor is a form of safety and ways of ambushing prey. Idiopidae adapt and live in many various environments as seen by the map on the far right, which leads to the various species to co-exist with other Idiopidae and other spiders outside of the family. Idiopidae do not deliver a bite that is dangerous to humans.

== Description ==
Spiders in this family have large bodies, similar to those of tarantulas. In most species the males have a spur on their legs, which is used to immobilise the female and prevent her from biting during the mating process. The lateral posterior spinnerets are elongated.

The oldest known idiopid, Number 16, died at the age of 43 years.

== Genera ==
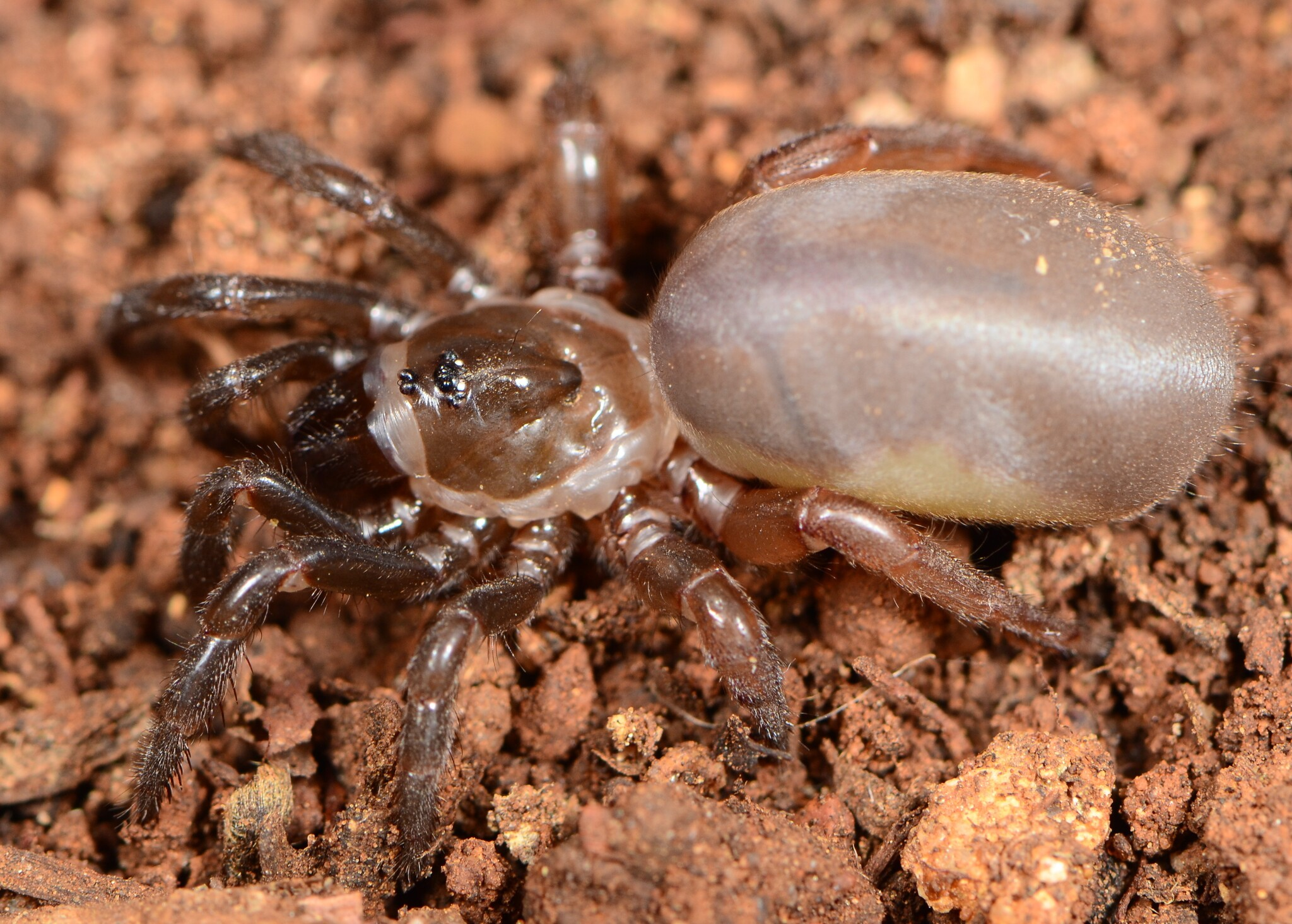
female Ctenolophus fenoulheti

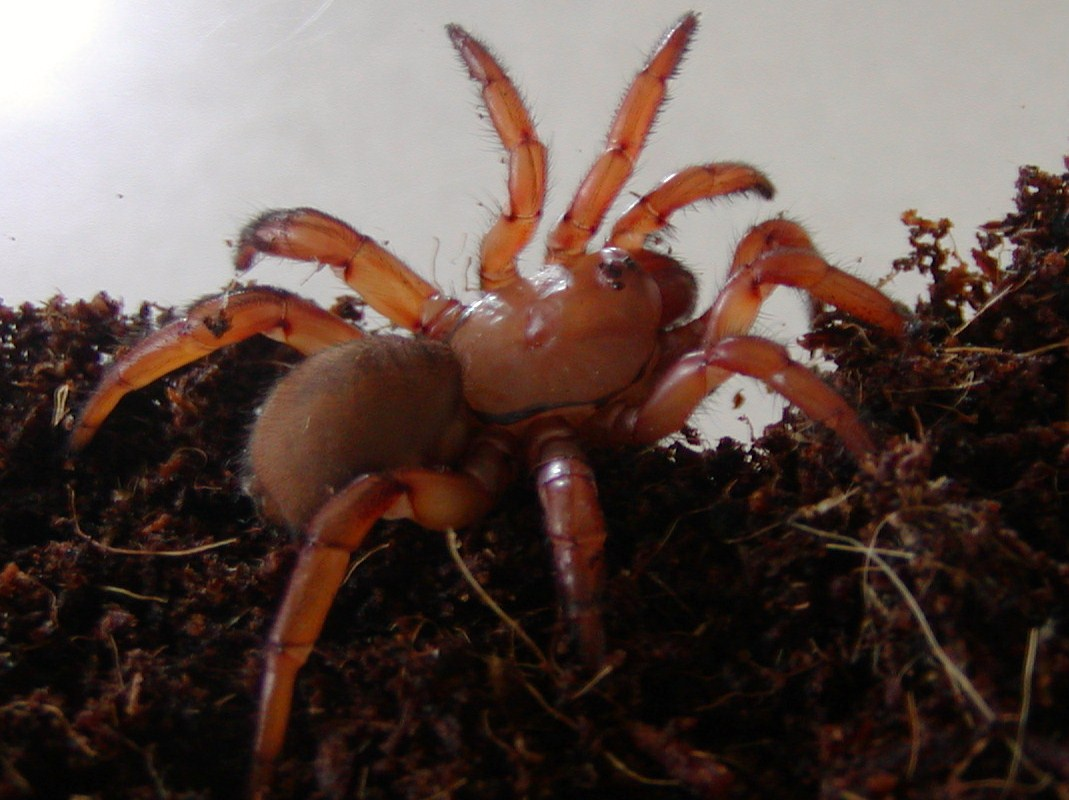
Gorgyrella sp.

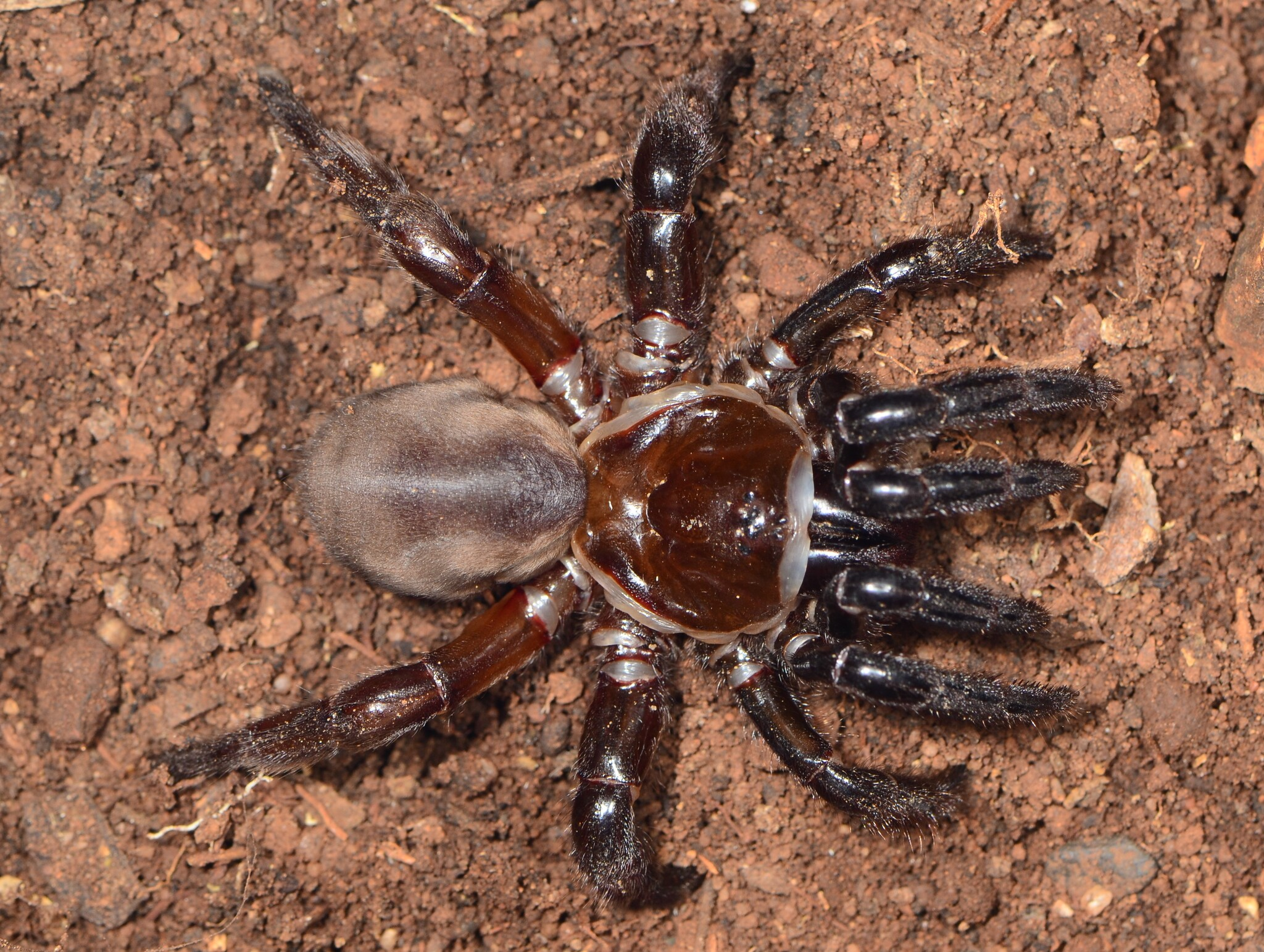
female Idiops castaneus

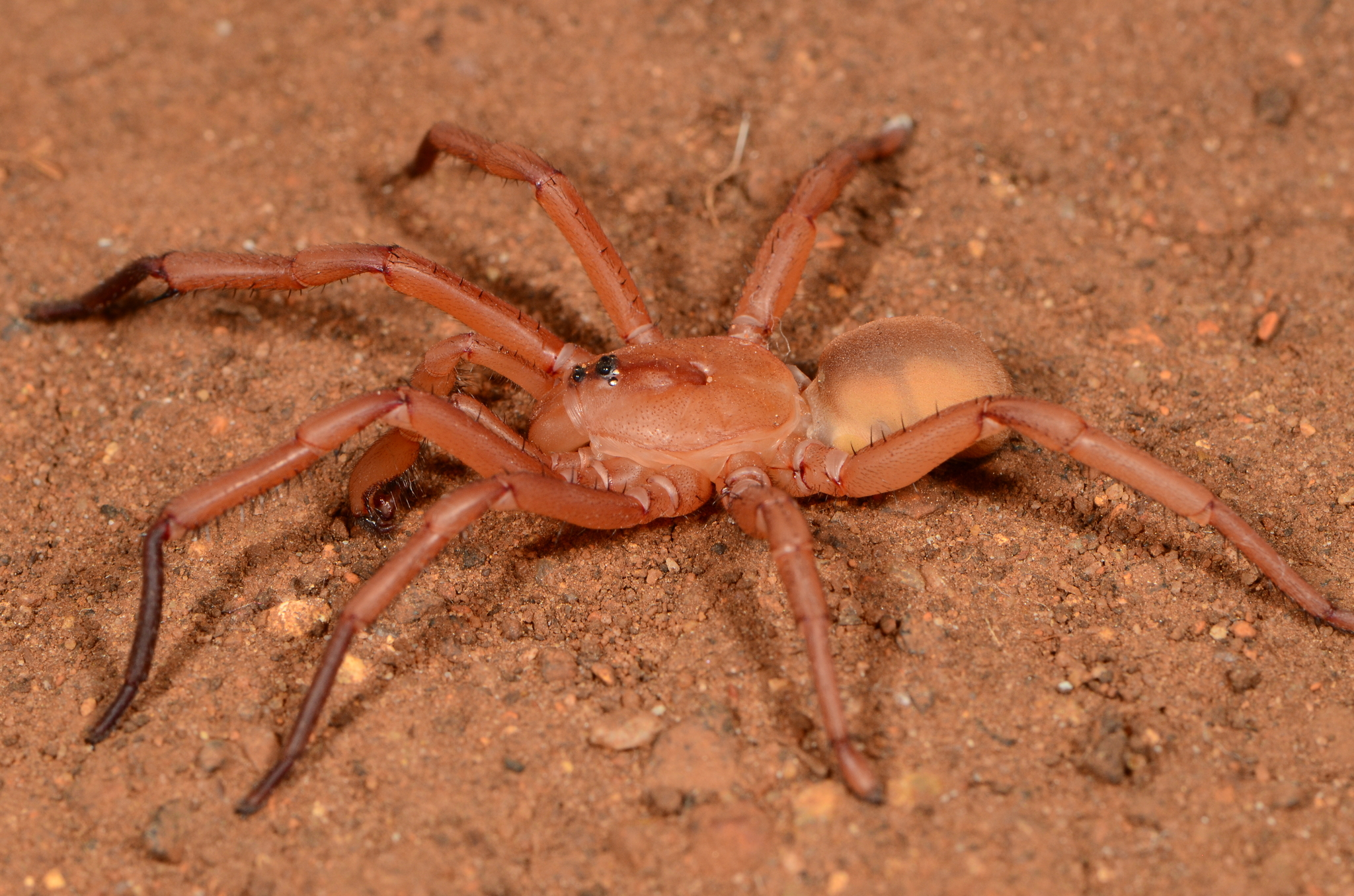
male Idiops sylvestris

As of January 2026, this family includes 23 genera and 451 species:

- Arbanitis L. Koch, 1874 – Australia, possibly New Guinea
- Blakistonia Hogg, 1902 – Australia
- Bungulla Rix, Main, Raven & Harvey, 2017 – Australia
- Cantuaria Hogg, 1902 – Australia, New Zealand
- Cataxia Rainbow, 1914 – Australia
- Cryptoforis Wilson, Rix & Raven, 2020 – Australia
- Ctenolophus Purcell, 1904 – South Africa
- Eucanippe Rix, Main, Raven & Harvey, 2017 – Australia
- Eucyrtops Pocock, 1897 – Australia
- Euoplos Rainbow, 1914 – Australia
- Gaius Rainbow, 1914 – Australia
- Galeosoma Purcell, 1903 – Mozambique, Botswana, South Africa
- Genysa Simon, 1889 – Madagascar
- Gorgyrella Purcell, 1902 – South Africa, Zimbabwe
- Heligmomerus Simon, 1892 – Africa, India, Sri Lanka
- Hiboka Fage, 1922 – Madagascar
- Idiops Perty, 1833 – Africa, India, Pakistan, Trinidad and Tobago, South America
- Idiosoma Ausserer, 1871 – Australia
- Neocteniza Pocock, 1895 – Central America, South America
- Prothemenops Schwendinger, 1991 – Thailand
- Scalidognathus Karsch, 1892 – India, Sri Lanka
- Segregara Tucker, 1917 – South Africa
- Titanidiops Simon, 1903 – Kenya, Tanzania, Morocco, Zimbabwe, Asia, Canary Islands
