= Zelotes aridus =

Laingsburg Dark Ground Spider

Scientific classification
- Kingdom: Animalia
- Phylum: Arthropoda
- Subphylum: Chelicerata
- Class: Arachnida
- Order: Araneae
- Infraorder: Araneomorphae
- Family: Gnaphosidae
- Genus: Zelotes
- Species: Z. aridus

Binomial name
- Zelotes aridus (Purcell, 1907)

Synonyms
- Melanophora arida Purcell, 1907; Camillina arida Tucker, 1923

Species of spider

Zelotes aridus is a species of spider in the family Gnaphosidae. It is commonly known as the Laingsburg dark ground spider.

== Distribution ==
Zelotes aridus is an African species distributed across Tanzania, Namibia, and South Africa. In South Africa, the species is possibly undersampled and presently recorded from Limpopo and Western Cape, at altitudes ranging from 648 to 1,645 m above sea level.

Notable locations include the type locality of Laingsburg in the Western Cape and Karoo National Park.

== Habitat and ecology ==
The species inhabits the Nama Karoo and Savanna biomes. These are free-running ground spiders that are found under stones during the day.

== Conservation ==
Zelotes aridus is listed as Least Concern by the South African National Biodiversity Institute due to its wide geographic range. There are no significant threats to the species, and it is protected in Karoo National Park.

== Taxonomy ==
The species was originally described by Purcell in 1907 from Laingsburg in the Western Cape as Melanophora arida. It was transferred to Camillina by Tucker in 1923, and later to Zelotes by FitzPatrick in 2007. The species is known from both sexes.
