= Stasimopus bimaculatus =

Karoo Cork-Lid Trapdoor Spider

Conservation status
- Least Concern (SANBI Red List)

Scientific classification
- Kingdom: Animalia
- Phylum: Arthropoda
- Subphylum: Chelicerata
- Class: Arachnida
- Order: Araneae
- Infraorder: Mygalomorphae
- Family: Stasimopidae
- Genus: Stasimopus
- Species: S. bimaculatus

Binomial name
- Stasimopus bimaculatus Purcell, 1903

Species of spider

Stasimopus bimaculatus is a species of spider in the family Stasimopidae. It is endemic to South Africa and is commonly known as the Karoo cork-lid trapdoor spider.

== Distribution ==
Stasimopus bimaculatus is found in the Eastern Cape and Western Cape provinces of South Africa. It occurs at Willowmore and in Karoo National Park at Lammetjiesleegte, at altitudes ranging from 837 to 1,375 m above sea level.

== Habitat and ecology ==
The species is a ground dweller that lives in silk-lined burrows closed with a thick trapdoor lid. It has been sampled from the Nama Karoo and Grassland biomes.

== Description ==
Stasimopus bimaculatus is known only from the female. The colour is brown, with the carapace behind and the two posterior pairs of legs paler and more yellowish. The pedipalps are ochraceous above along the middle of the patella and tibia, the two posterior pairs of legs and the four pairs of coxae are pale ochraceous. The opisthosoma is pallid, with a small black dorsal patch in front and a larger one behind.

== Conservation ==
Stasimopus bimaculatus is listed as Least Concern by the South African National Biodiversity Institute. The species has a wide range and is therefore considered stable. It is protected in Karoo National Park. Threats to the species are unknown.

== Taxonomy ==
The species was originally described by Purcell in 1903 from Willowmore. The genus has not yet been revised, and identification of the male remains problematic.
