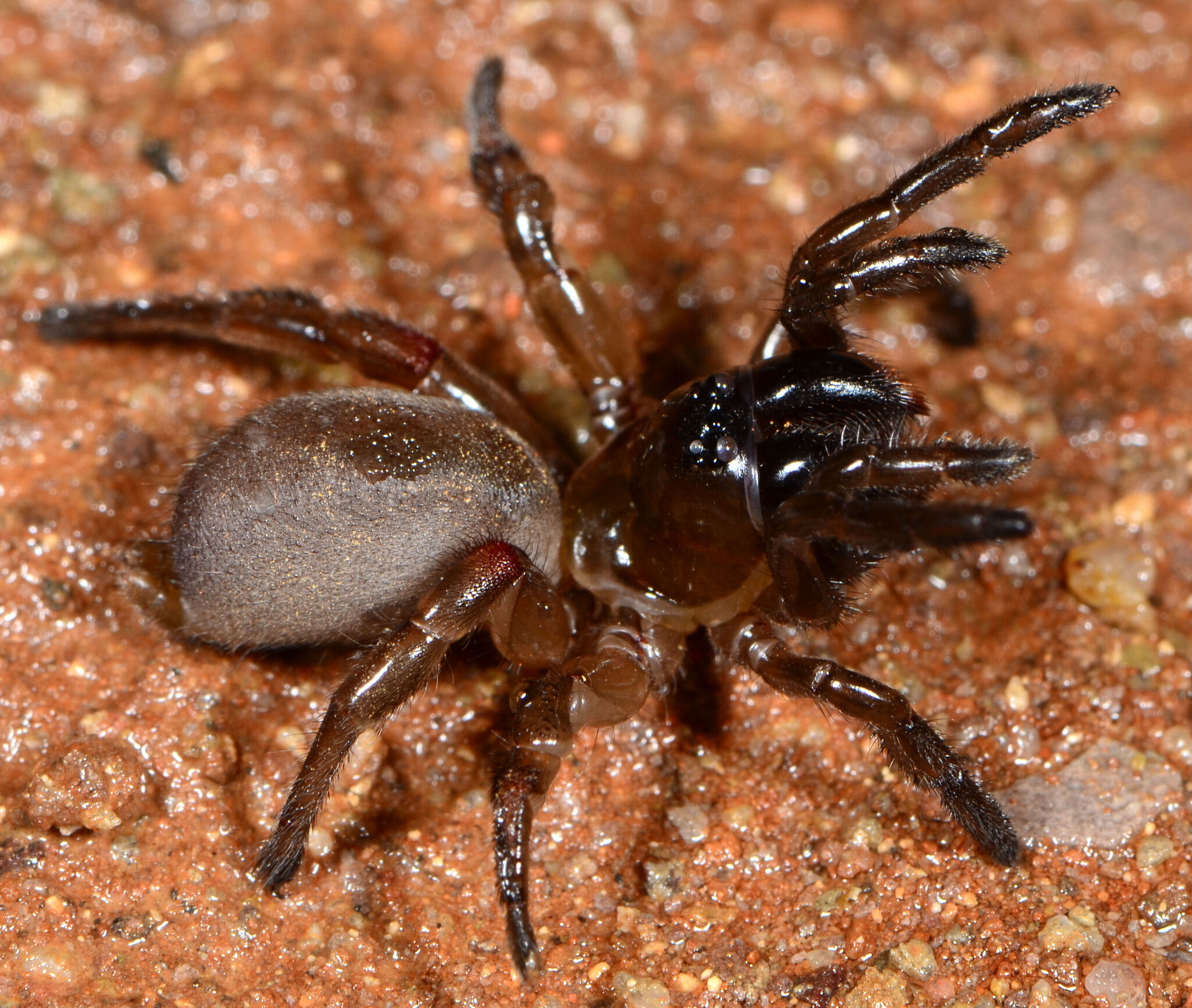
- Female
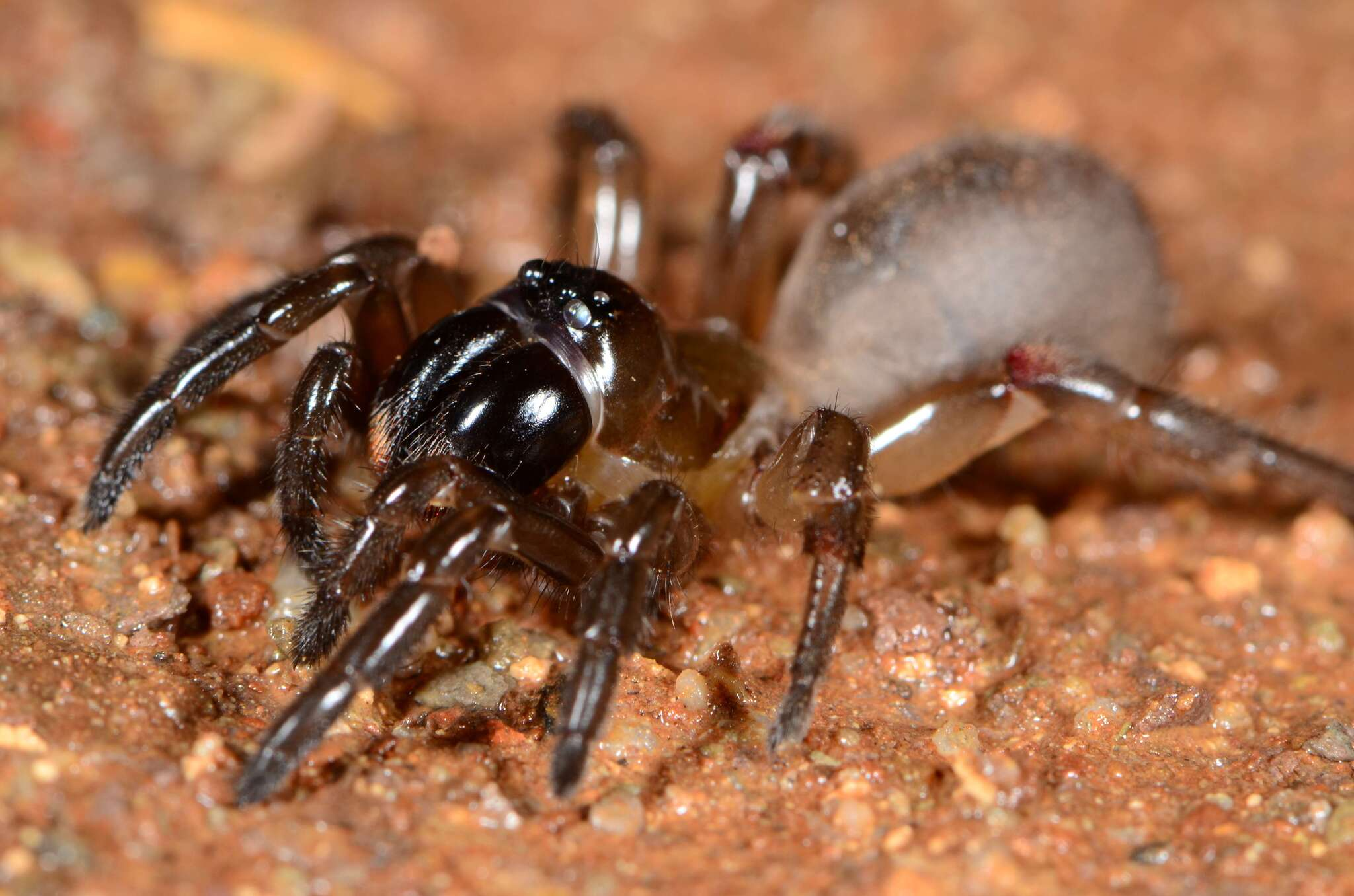
- Female

Scientific classification
- Kingdom: Animalia
- Phylum: Arthropoda
- Subphylum: Chelicerata
- Class: Arachnida
- Order: Araneae
- Infraorder: Mygalomorphae
- Family: Stasimopidae
- Genus: Stasimopus
- Species: S. maraisi

Binomial name
- Stasimopus maraisi Hewitt, 1914

= Stasimopus maraisi =

Marais's Cork-Lid Trapdoor Spider

Species of spider

Stasimopus maraisi is a species of spider in the family Stasimopidae. It is endemic to South Africa and is commonly known as Marais's cork-lid trapdoor spider.

== Distribution ==
Stasimopus maraisi is found in the Northern Cape and Western Cape provinces of South Africa. It occurs at Farm Driefontein near Victoria West in the Northern Cape, and at Beaufort West, Swartberg Nature Reserve, Karoo National Park, and Aardvark Nature Reserve in the Western Cape. The species is found at altitudes ranging from 588 to 1270 m above sea level.

== Habitat and ecology ==
The species inhabits the Fynbos and Nama Karoo biomes.

== Description ==
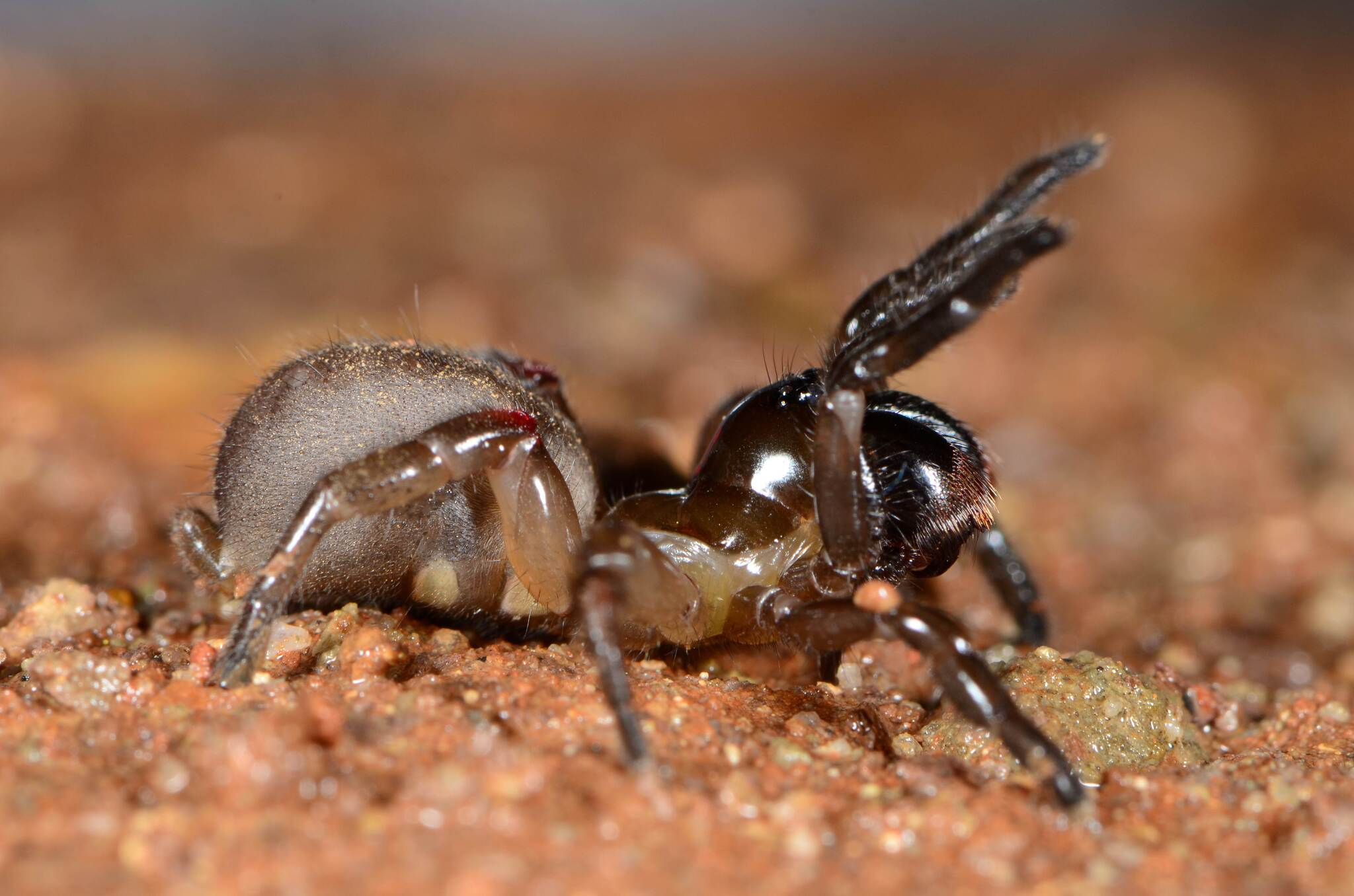
female

Stasimopus maraisi is distinguished by the small size of the posterior lateral eyes, which is perhaps the most striking feature of the species in both sexes. Females have a carapace and appendages that are pale brown above, with the chelicerae rather more deeply coloured. The abdomen is pale above with some dark blotches which in the posterior half are symmetrically arranged, forming a kind of tree pattern. Total length is 32.5 mm. Males have a carapace with a tuft of hairs over the ocular area and the usual three keels present, with the median one carrying hairs and extending to the fovea.

== Conservation ==
Stasimopus maraisi is listed as Data Deficient by the IUCN. Identification of the species is problematic and the status remains obscure. The species is protected in Swartberg Nature Reserve and Karoo National Park, but more sampling is needed to determine its full range.

== Taxonomy ==
The species was originally described by Hewitt in 1914 from Victoria West. It is known from both sexes.
