= Stasimopus dreyeri =

Scientific classification
- Kingdom: Animalia
- Phylum: Arthropoda
- Subphylum: Chelicerata
- Class: Arachnida
- Order: Araneae
- Infraorder: Mygalomorphae
- Family: Stasimopidae
- Genus: Stasimopus
- Species: S. dreyeri

Binomial name
- Stasimopus dreyeri Hewitt, 1915

Species of spider

Stasimopus dreyeri is a species of spider in the family Stasimopidae. It is endemic to South Africa.

== Distribution ==
Stasimopus dreyeri is found in the Free State province of South Africa. It is known only from the type locality at Kroonstad at an altitude of 1,374 m above sea level.

== Habitat and ecology ==
The species is a ground dweller that lives in silk-lined burrows closed with a round cork-lid trapdoor in the Grassland biome.

== Description ==
Stasimopus dreyeri is known only from a female. The carapace is castaneous, appendages are dark, and the opisthosoma is somewhat infuscated over the median area above. Total length is 36 mm.

== Conservation ==
Stasimopus dreyeri is listed as Data Deficient for taxonomic reasons by the South African National Biodiversity Institute. The status of the species remains obscure, and more sampling is needed to collect the male and to determine the species' present range. The species is threatened by habitat loss for urbanization and possibly crop farming in the surrounding areas.

== Taxonomy ==
The species was originally described by Hewitt in 1915 from Kroonstad. The genus has not yet been revised.
