= Stasimopus palpiger =

Scientific classification
- Kingdom: Animalia
- Phylum: Arthropoda
- Subphylum: Chelicerata
- Class: Arachnida
- Order: Araneae
- Infraorder: Mygalomorphae
- Family: Stasimopidae
- Genus: Stasimopus
- Species: S. palpiger

Binomial name
- Stasimopus palpiger Pocock, 1902

Species of spider

Stasimopus palpiger is a species of spider in the family Stasimopidae. It is endemic to South Africa.

== Distribution ==
Stasimopus palpiger is endemic to the Eastern Cape province of South Africa. It is known only from the type locality at Graaff-Reinet at an altitude of 746 m above sea level.

== Habitat and ecology ==
The species inhabits the Nama Karoo biome. Stasimopus palpiger is a ground dweller that constructs silk-lined burrows closed with a cork-lid trapdoor.

== Conservation ==
Stasimopus palpiger is listed as Data Deficient for taxonomic reasons. The species has a very restricted distribution range. The type locality faces a moderate but ongoing decline of suitable habitat due to housing development. The status of the species remains obscure, and more sampling is needed to collect females and determine the species' full range.

== Etymology ==
The species name palpiger means "bearing palps" in Latin.

== Taxonomy ==
The species was originally described by Pocock in 1902 from Graaff-Reinet. It has not been revised since its original description and remains known only from male specimens, with the male palp illustrated in the original description.
