= Stasimopus schreineri =

Scientific classification
- Kingdom: Animalia
- Phylum: Arthropoda
- Subphylum: Chelicerata
- Class: Arachnida
- Order: Araneae
- Infraorder: Mygalomorphae
- Family: Stasimopidae
- Genus: Stasimopus
- Species: S. schreineri

Binomial name
- Stasimopus schreineri Purcell, 1903

Species of spider

Stasimopus schreineri is a species in the family Stasimopidae. It is endemic to South Africa and is commonly known as Schreiner's cork-lid trapdoor spider.

== Distribution ==
Stasimopus schreineri is found in South Africa. The species occurs in two provinces, the Eastern Cape (Perseverance near Port Elizabeth and Somerset East) and the Northern Cape (De Aar and Hanover).

== Habitat and ecology ==
The species is a ground dweller that lives in silk-lined burrows closed with a cork-lid trapdoor. The lid is thick, nearly circular except at hinge with the upper surface irregular, concave or nearly flat, coated with mud. The underside is flat or more convex with circle of pits absent or reduced. The species has been sampled from the Nama Karoo and Thicket biomes at altitudes between 7-1358 m above sea level.

== Conservation ==
Stasimopus schreineri is listed as Data Deficient by the South African National Biodiversity Institute. The species is known from two provinces at altitudes of 7-1358 m above sea level, with all records collected prior to 1903. Threats to the species are unknown.

== Taxonomy ==
The species was originally described by W. F. Purcell in 1903 from Hanover. The species has not been revised and is known from both sexes. The status of the species remains obscure and additional sampling is needed to determine the present species' range.
