= Stasimopus steynsburgensis =

Scientific classification
- Kingdom: Animalia
- Phylum: Arthropoda
- Subphylum: Chelicerata
- Class: Arachnida
- Order: Araneae
- Infraorder: Mygalomorphae
- Family: Stasimopidae
- Genus: Stasimopus
- Species: S. steynsburgensis

Binomial name
- Stasimopus steynsburgensis Hewitt, 1915

Species of spider

Stasimopus steynsburgensis is a species in the family Stasimopidae. It is endemic to South Africa.

== Distribution ==
Stasimopus steynsburgensis is found in South Africa. The species is known only from the Eastern Cape province, specifically from Steynsburg.

== Habitat and ecology ==
The species is a ground dweller that lives in silk-lined burrows closed with a cork-lid trapdoor. The species has been sampled from the Thicket biome at an altitude of 1462 m above sea level.

== Conservation ==
Stasimopus steynsburgensis is listed as Data Deficient for taxonomic reasons by the South African National Biodiversity Institute. The species is an Eastern Cape endemic known only from the type locality at 1462 m above sea level. Threats to this species are unknown.

== Taxonomy ==
The species was originally described by John Hewitt in 1915 from Steynsburg. The species has not been revised and is known only from the male. The status remains obscure and additional sampling is needed to collect the female and determine the species' range.
