= Stasimopus hewitti =

Hewitt's Cork-Lid Trapdoor Spider

Conservation status
- Vulnerable (SANBI Red List)

Scientific classification
- Kingdom: Animalia
- Phylum: Arthropoda
- Subphylum: Chelicerata
- Class: Arachnida
- Order: Araneae
- Infraorder: Mygalomorphae
- Family: Stasimopidae
- Genus: Stasimopus
- Species: S. hewitti

Binomial name
- Stasimopus hewitti Engelbrecht & Prendini, 2012

Species of spider

Stasimopus hewitti is a species of spider in the family Stasimopidae. It is endemic to South Africa and is commonly known as Hewitt's cork-lid trapdoor spider.

== Distribution ==
Stasimopus hewitti is found in the Gauteng province of South Africa. It occurs at multiple locations including Eldoraigne (Centurion), Gesina (Pretoria), Grand Central airport complex, Hartebeeshoek, Olympus (Pretoria), Roodeplaat areas, Swavelpoort, Tswaing Crater Nature Reserve, and Zeekoegat, at altitudes ranging from 1,142 to 1,618 m above sea level.

== Habitat and ecology ==
The species is a ground burrow dweller that occurs in a wide range of habitats and soil types, appearing to be absent only from very sandy soils. It has been sampled from the Grassland biome.

== Description ==
Stasimopus hewitti is known from both sexes and are medium-sized spiders with carapace length of 8–12 mm. The male carapace is black, with legs I–IV metatarsi and tarsi red (IV occasionally black proximally). The rest of the legs and pedipalps are black. The opisthosoma has ventral and lateral surfaces black, with the dorsal surface powder blue. Book lung covers are yellow. Females resemble S. robertsi.

== Conservation ==
Stasimopus hewitti is listed as Vulnerable by the South African National Biodiversity Institute. There is ongoing habitat loss within this species' range to urbanization. About 50% of the species range has been transformed for infrastructure and housing development. The species is protected in the Roodeplaat Dam Nature Reserve and Tswaing Nature Reserve.

== Etymology ==
The species is named after South African zoologist John Hewitt.

== Taxonomy ==
The species was described by Engelbrecht & Prendini in 2012 from the Wonderboom district.
