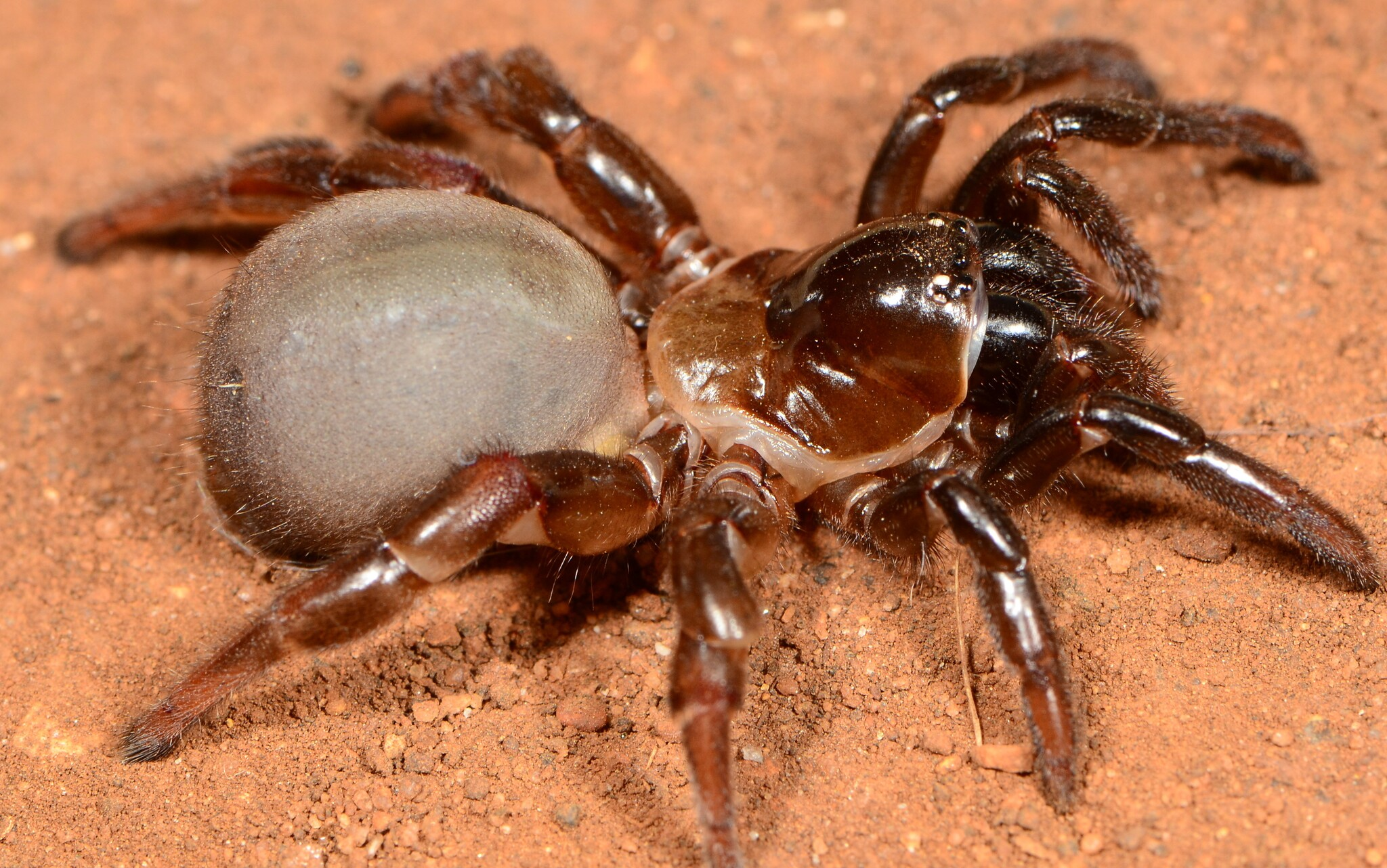
- Female S. coronatus
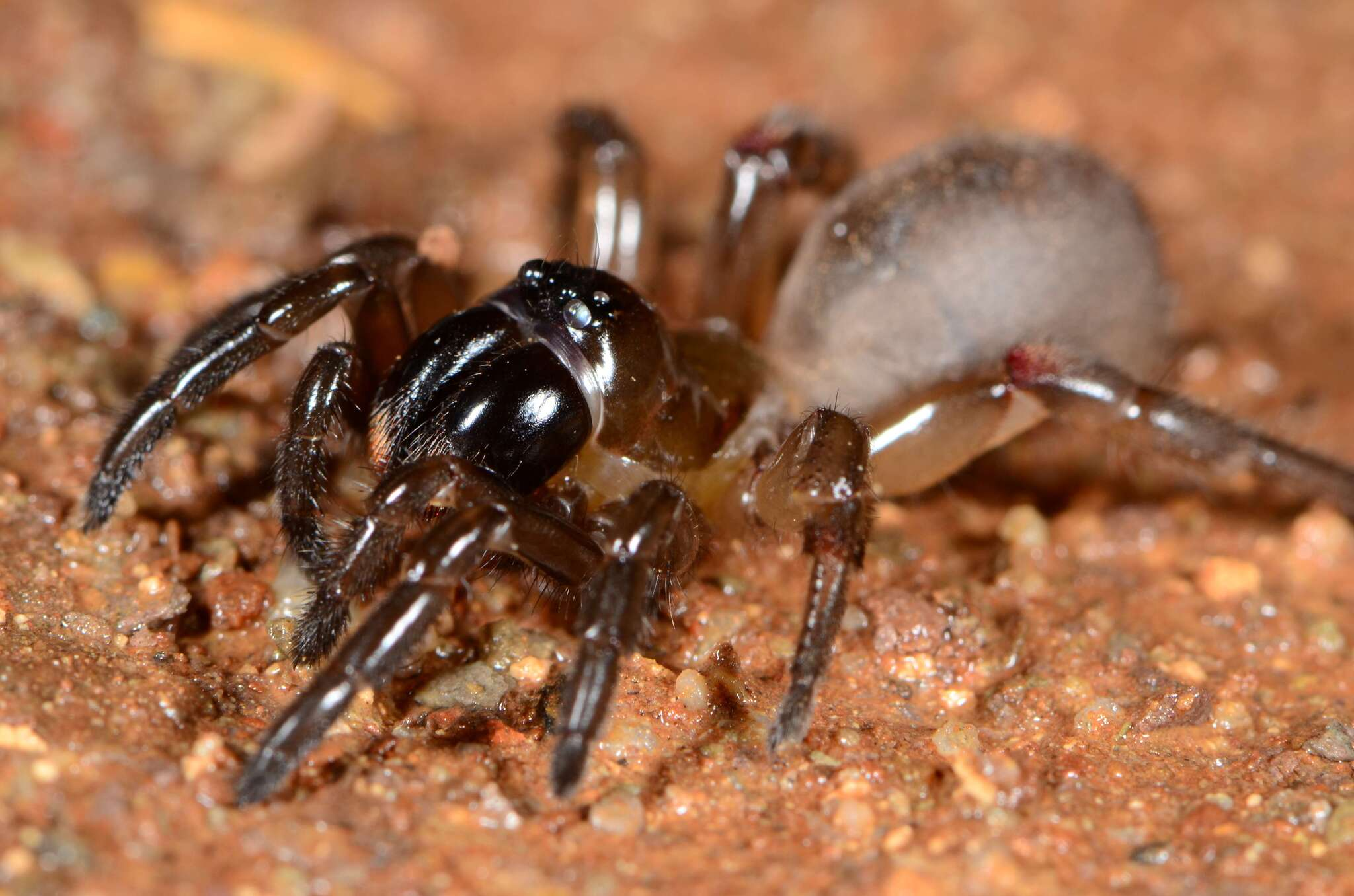
- Female S. maraisi

Scientific classification
- Kingdom: Animalia
- Phylum: Arthropoda
- Subphylum: Chelicerata
- Class: Arachnida
- Order: Araneae
- Infraorder: Mygalomorphae
- Clade: Avicularioidea
- Family: Stasimopidae; Opatova & Hedin, 2020
- Genus: Stasimopus; Simon, 1892

Type species
- S. caffrus (C. L. Koch, 1842)

Species
- 54, see text

= Stasimopus =

African cork-lid trapdoor spiders

Genus of spiders

Stasimopus is a genus of southern African mygalomorph spiders that was first described by Eugène Louis Simon in 1892. It is the only genus in the family Stasimopidae.

== Species ==
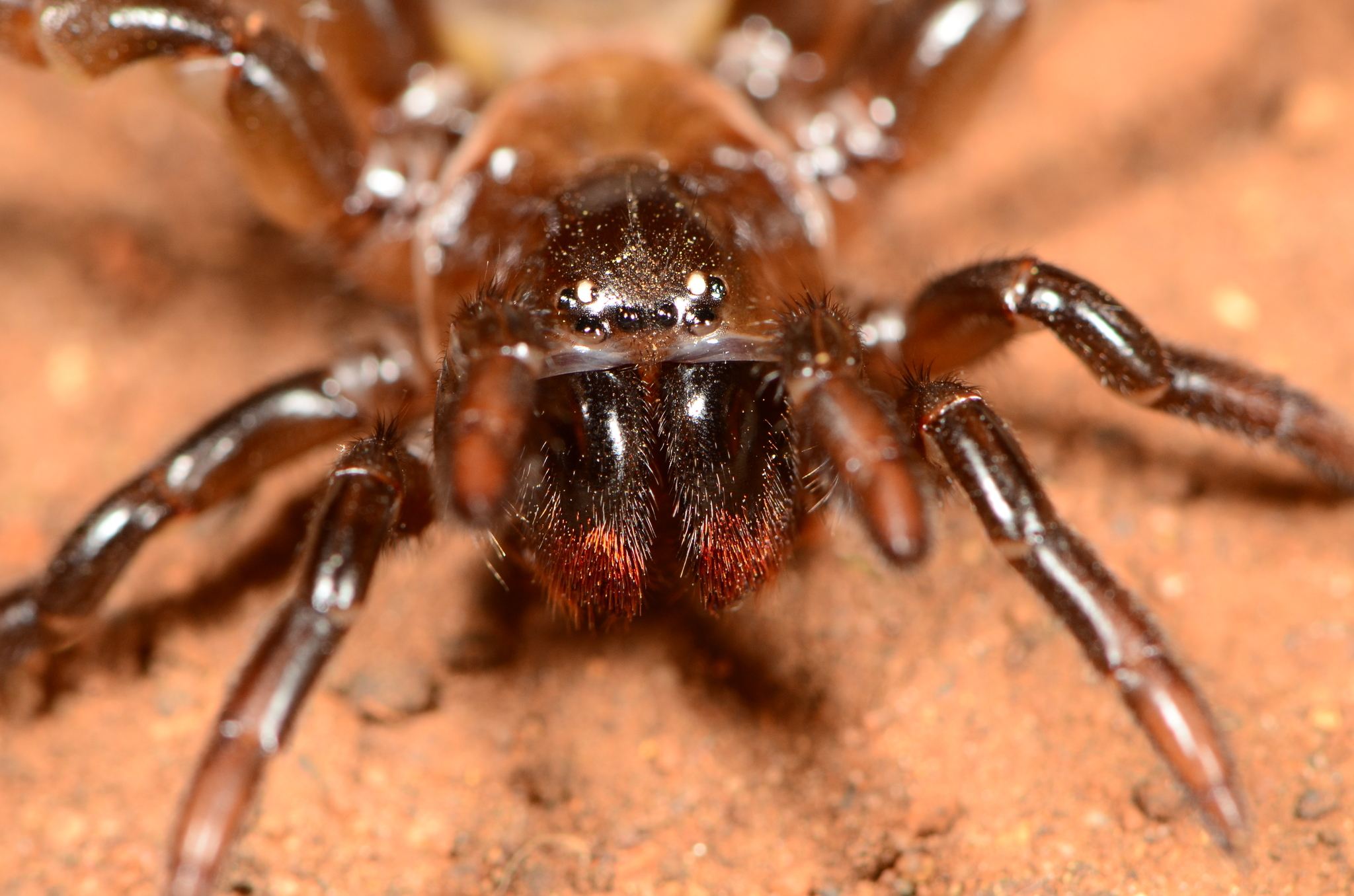
female S. coronatus

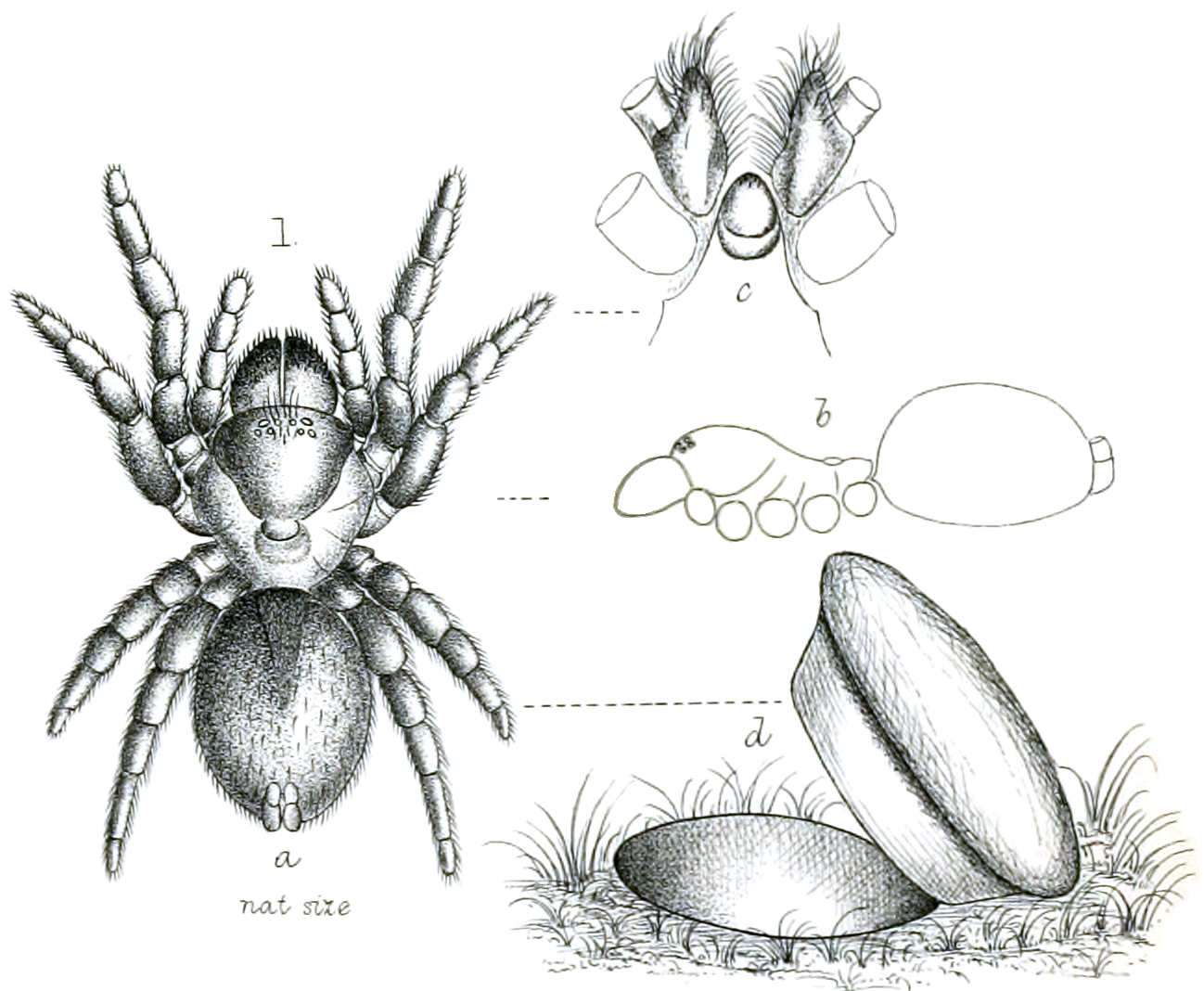
female S. rufidens

As of September 2025, this genus includes 54 species and two subspecies, found in southern Africa:

- Stasimopus artifex Pocock, 1902 – South Africa
- Stasimopus astutus Pocock, 1902 – South Africa
- Stasimopus bimaculatus Purcell, 1903 – South Africa
- Stasimopus brevipalpis Purcell, 1903 – South Africa
- Stasimopus caffrus (C. L. Koch, 1842) – South Africa (type species)
- Stasimopus castaneus Purcell, 1903 – South Africa
- Stasimopus coronatus Hewitt, 1915 – South Africa
- Stasimopus dreyeri Hewitt, 1915 – South Africa
- Stasimopus dylani Brandt, Sole & Lyle, 2023 – South Africa
- Stasimopus erythrognathus Purcell, 1903 – South Africa
- Stasimopus filmeri Engelbrecht & Prendini, 2012 – South Africa
- Stasimopus finni Brandt, Sole & Lyle, 2023 – South Africa
- Stasimopus fordi Hewitt, 1927 – South Africa
- Stasimopus gigas Hewitt, 1915 – South Africa
- Stasimopus griswoldi Engelbrecht & Prendini, 2012 – South Africa
- Stasimopus hamartia Brandt, Sole & Lyle, 2023 – South Africa
- Stasimopus hewitti Engelbrecht & Prendini, 2012 – South Africa
- Stasimopus ignis Brandt, Sole & Lyle, 2023 – South Africa
- Stasimopus insculptus Pocock, 1901 – South Africa
  - Stasimopus insculptus peddiensis Hewitt, 1917 – South Africa
- Stasimopus karooensis Brandt, Sole & Lyle, 2023 – South Africa
- Stasimopus kentanicus Purcell, 1903 – South Africa
- Stasimopus kolbei Purcell, 1903 – South Africa
- Stasimopus leipoldti Purcell, 1902 – South Africa
- Stasimopus longipalpis Hewitt, 1917 – South Africa
- Stasimopus malesociatus Brandt, Sole & Lyle, 2023 – South Africa
- Stasimopus mandelai Hendrixson & Bond, 2004 – South Africa
- Stasimopus maraisi Hewitt, 1914 – South Africa
- Stasimopus meyeri (Karsch, 1879) – South Africa
- Stasimopus minor Hewitt, 1915 – South Africa
- Stasimopus nanus Tucker, 1917 – South Africa
- Stasimopus nigellus Pocock, 1902 – South Africa
- Stasimopus obscurus Purcell, 1908 – South Africa
- Stasimopus oculatus Pocock, 1897 – South Africa
- Stasimopus palpiger Pocock, 1902 – South Africa
- Stasimopus patersonae Hewitt, 1913 – South Africa
- Stasimopus poweri Hewitt, 1915 – South Africa
- Stasimopus purcelli Tucker, 1917 – South Africa
- Stasimopus quadratimaculatus Purcell, 1903 – South Africa
- Stasimopus qumbu Hewitt, 1913 – South Africa
- Stasimopus robertsi Hewitt, 1910 – South Africa
- Stasimopus rufidens (Ausserer, 1871) – South Africa
- Stasimopus schoenlandi Pocock, 1900 – South Africa
- Stasimopus schreineri Purcell, 1903 – South Africa
- Stasimopus schultzei Purcell, 1908 – South Africa
- Stasimopus spinipes Hewitt, 1917 – South Africa
- Stasimopus spinosus Hewitt, 1914 – South Africa
- Stasimopus steynsburgensis Hewitt, 1915 – South Africa
- Stasimopus suffuscus Hewitt, 1916 – South Africa
- Stasimopus teras Brandt, Sole & Lyle, 2023 – South Africa
- Stasimopus theaei Brandt, Sole & Lyle, 2023 – South Africa
- Stasimopus tysoni Hewitt, 1919 – South Africa
- Stasimopus umtaticus Purcell, 1903 – South Africa
  - Stasimopus umtaticus rangeri Hewitt, 1927 – South Africa
- Stasimopus unispinosus Purcell, 1903 – South Africa
- Stasimopus venterstadensis Brandt, Sole & Lyle, 2023 – South Africa

In synonymy:

- S. dubius Hewitt, 1913 = Stasimopus robertsi Hewitt, 1910
