= Stasimopus spinipes =

Scientific classification
- Kingdom: Animalia
- Phylum: Arthropoda
- Subphylum: Chelicerata
- Class: Arachnida
- Order: Araneae
- Infraorder: Mygalomorphae
- Family: Stasimopidae
- Genus: Stasimopus
- Species: S. spinipes

Binomial name
- Stasimopus spinipes Hewitt, 1917

Species of spider

Stasimopus spinipes is a species in the family Stasimopidae. It is endemic to South Africa and is commonly known as the East London cork-lid trapdoor spider.

== Distribution ==
Stasimopus spinipes is found in South Africa. The species is known only from the Eastern Cape province, specifically from East London.

== Habitat and ecology ==
The species is a ground dweller that lives in silk-lined burrows closed with a cork-lid trapdoor. The species has been sampled from the Thicket biome at an altitude of 56 m above sea level.

== Description ==
The species is known from both sexes, with photographs provided.

== Conservation ==
Stasimopus spinipes is listed as Data Deficient by the South African National Biodiversity Institute. The species is an Eastern Cape endemic known only from the type locality at 56 m above sea level.

== Taxonomy ==
The species was originally described by John Hewitt in 1917 from East London. The species has not been revised and the status remains obscure. Additional sampling is needed to determine the species' range.
