= Stasimopus astutus =

Scientific classification
- Kingdom: Animalia
- Phylum: Arthropoda
- Subphylum: Chelicerata
- Class: Arachnida
- Order: Araneae
- Infraorder: Mygalomorphae
- Family: Stasimopidae
- Genus: Stasimopus
- Species: S. astutus

Binomial name
- Stasimopus astutus Pocock, 1902

Species of spider

Stasimopus astutus is a species of spider in the family Stasimopidae. It is endemic to South Africa.

== Distribution ==
Stasimopus astutus is found in the Eastern Cape province of South Africa. It occurs at Pearston, Bedford, and Jansenville at altitudes ranging from 415 to 736 m above sea level.

== Habitat and ecology ==
The species is a ground dweller that lives in silk-lined burrows closed with a thick trapdoor lid. It has been recorded from the Thicket and Nama Karoo biomes.

== Description ==
Stasimopus astutus is known from both sexes. Females reach a total body length of 35 mm.

== Conservation ==
Stasimopus astutus is listed as Data Deficient by the South African National Biodiversity Institute. The species is suspected to be under-collected since trapdoor spiders are not easy to locate. Identification of the species is problematic, and more sampling is needed to determine the species' present range. There are no obvious threats to the species.

== Taxonomy ==
The species was originally described by Pocock in 1902 from Pearston. The genus has not yet been revised.
