= Stasimopus meyeri =

Scientific classification
- Kingdom: Animalia
- Phylum: Arthropoda
- Subphylum: Chelicerata
- Class: Arachnida
- Order: Araneae
- Infraorder: Mygalomorphae
- Family: Stasimopidae
- Genus: Stasimopus
- Species: S. meyeri

Binomial name
- Stasimopus meyeri (Karsch, 1879)

Species of spider

Stasimopus meyeri is a species of spider in the family Stasimopidae. It is endemic to South Africa.

== Distribution ==
Stasimopus meyeri is endemic to the Northern Cape province of South Africa. It is known only from the Hantam district, though no exact locality is specified.

== Habitat and ecology ==
The species inhabits the Nama Karoo biome. Stasimopus meyeri is a ground dweller that constructs silk-lined burrows closed with a cork-lid trapdoor.

== Conservation ==
Stasimopus meyeri is listed as Data Deficient for taxonomic reasons. The status of the species remains obscure, and more sampling is needed to collect males and determine the species' full range.

== Taxonomy ==
The species was originally described by Karsch in 1879 as Moggridgea meyeri. It has not been revised since its original description and remains known only from the female specimen.
