= Stasimopus spinosus =

Scientific classification
- Kingdom: Animalia
- Phylum: Arthropoda
- Subphylum: Chelicerata
- Class: Arachnida
- Order: Araneae
- Infraorder: Mygalomorphae
- Family: Stasimopidae
- Genus: Stasimopus
- Species: S. spinosus

Binomial name
- Stasimopus spinosus Hewitt, 1914

Species of spider

Stasimopus spinosus is a species in the family Stasimopidae. It is endemic to South Africa.

== Distribution ==
Stasimopus spinosus is found in South Africa. The species occurs in the Eastern Cape province at Alice, Annshaw, Debe Neck, and Middledrift.

== Habitat and ecology ==
The species is a ground dweller that lives in silk-lined burrows closed with a cork-lid trapdoor. The species has been sampled from the Thicket biome at altitudes between 474-860 m above sea level.

== Conservation ==
Stasimopus spinosus is listed as Data Deficient by the South African National Biodiversity Institute. The species is known from four localities at altitudes of 474-860 m above sea level, but all were sampled prior to 1914. Threats to this species are unknown.

== Taxonomy ==
The species was originally described by John Hewitt in 1914 as Stasimopus schönlandi spinosus from Annshaw. The species has not been revised and is known from both sexes. The status remains obscure and additional sampling is needed to determine the present species' range.
