= Stasimopus robertsi =

Roberts' Cork-Lid Trapdoor Spider

Conservation status
- Near Threatened (SANBI Red List)

Scientific classification
- Kingdom: Animalia
- Phylum: Arthropoda
- Subphylum: Chelicerata
- Class: Arachnida
- Order: Araneae
- Infraorder: Mygalomorphae
- Family: Stasimopidae
- Genus: Stasimopus
- Species: S. robertsi

Binomial name
- Stasimopus robertsi Hewitt, 1910

Synonyms
- Stasimopus dubius Hewitt, 1913

Species of spider

Stasimopus robertsi is a species in the family Stasimopidae. It is endemic to South Africa and is commonly known as Roberts' cork-lid trapdoor spider.

== Etymology ==
The species is named after A. Roberts, who collected specimens for the original description along with G.P.F. van Dam of the Transvaal Museum.

== Distribution ==
Stasimopus robertsi is found in South Africa. The species occurs in Gauteng province around Pretoria, including Faerie Glen Nature Reserve, Hatfield, and Magaliesberg at Wonderboom Poort.

== Habitat and ecology ==
The species is a ground dweller that lives in burrows usually made in hard, bare ground, sometimes associated with grass under rocks. The burrow is closed with a lid 6 mm thick with distinct pits on the lid. The burrow is vertical with width at top 25 mm and width at bottom 28 mm. Males have been collected from burrows with lids that closely resemble those of the female, but smaller. The species has been sampled from the Grassland and Savanna biomes at altitudes between 1,213-1,692 m above sea level.

== Description ==
The species is known from both sexes.

== Conservation ==
Stasimopus robertsi is listed as Near Threatened by the South African National Biodiversity Institute. The species is threatened by ongoing loss of habitat for infrastructure development in parts of its range, with approximately 83% of its habitat irreversibly transformed. It is known from between 10 and 15 extant locations from two provinces at altitudes of 1,213-1,692 m above sea level.

== Taxonomy ==
The species was originally described by John Hewitt in 1910 from Mayville, Pretoria. The species was revised by Engelbrecht and Prendini in 2012. According to their revision, the identity of female material from localities at which males were not collected is uncertain.
