= Stasimopus obscurus =

Scientific classification
- Kingdom: Animalia
- Phylum: Arthropoda
- Subphylum: Chelicerata
- Class: Arachnida
- Order: Araneae
- Infraorder: Mygalomorphae
- Family: Stasimopidae
- Genus: Stasimopus
- Species: S. obscurus

Binomial name
- Stasimopus obscurus Purcell, 1908

Species of spider

Stasimopus obscurus is a species of spider in the family Stasimopidae. It is endemic to South Africa.

== Distribution ==
Stasimopus obscurus is found in the Northern Cape and Free State provinces of South Africa. The type locality is given only as "Little Namaqualand" in the Northern Cape, and it has also been found at Reddersburg in the Free State. The species occurs at altitudes ranging from 951 to 1400 m above sea level.

== Habitat and ecology ==
The species inhabits the Grassland and Nama Karoo biomes. Stasimopus obscurus is a ground dweller that constructs silk-lined burrows closed with a cork-lid trapdoor.

== Description ==
Stasimopus obscurus is known only from females. The carapace and limbs are brown, with the two posterior pairs of legs being lighter. The abdomen is black and paler below. Leg IV has a large patch of red spinules on the patella, occupying over three-quarters of the length of the anterior surface. Total length including chelicerae is 24 mm.

== Conservation ==
Stasimopus obscurus is listed as Data Deficient for taxonomic reasons. The status of the species remains obscure, and more sampling is needed to collect males and determine the species' full range.

== Taxonomy ==
The species was originally described by Purcell in 1908 from a type locality given only as "Little Namaqualand". Dr. Schultze stated that he was not absolutely certain that the locality was correct. It has not been revised since its original description and remains known only from female specimens.
