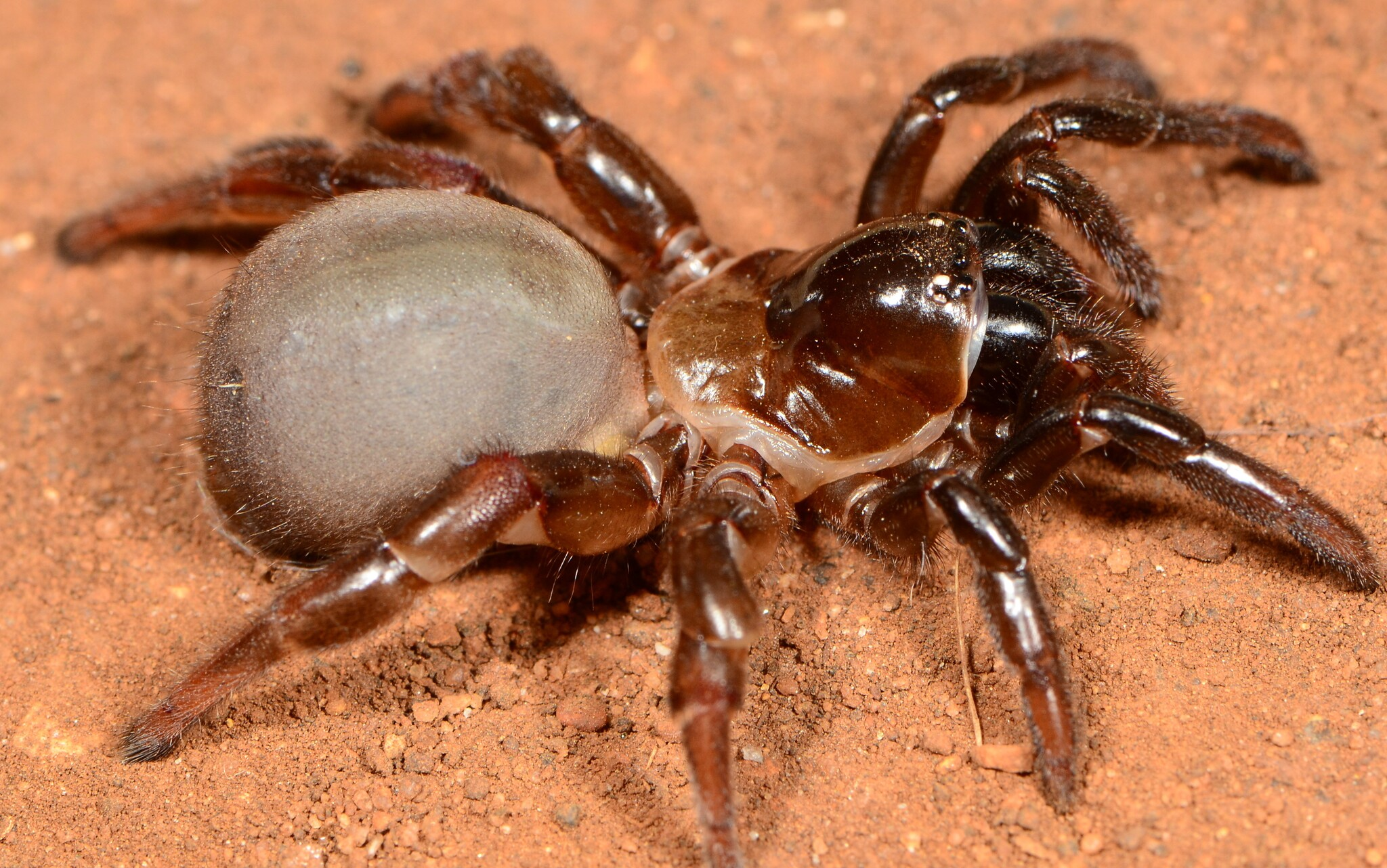
- Female
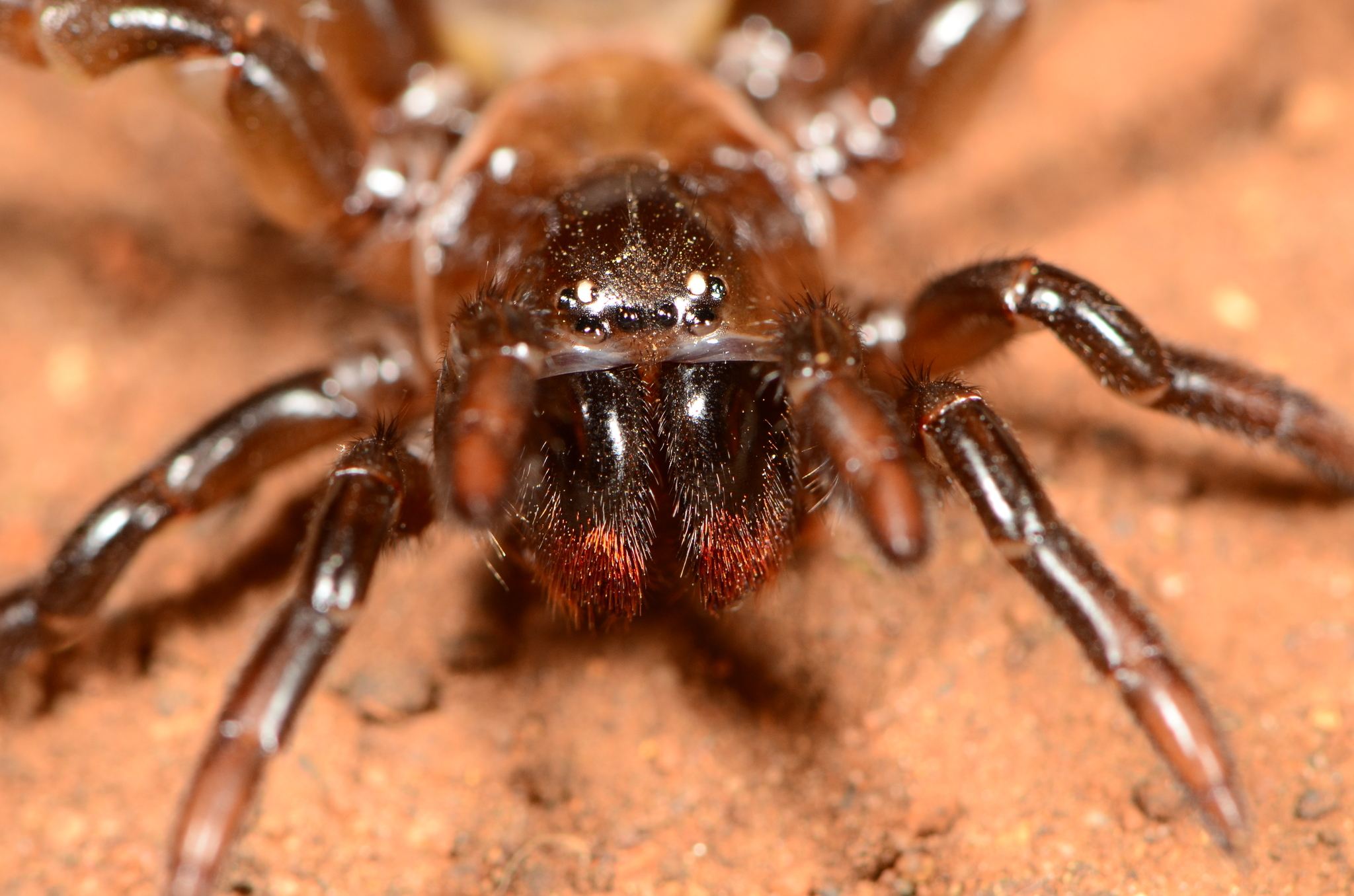
- Female

Scientific classification
- Kingdom: Animalia
- Phylum: Arthropoda
- Subphylum: Chelicerata
- Class: Arachnida
- Order: Araneae
- Infraorder: Mygalomorphae
- Family: Stasimopidae
- Genus: Stasimopus
- Species: S. coronatus

Binomial name
- Stasimopus coronatus Hewitt, 1915

= Stasimopus coronatus =

Kroonstad Cork-Lid Trapdoor Spider

Species of spider

Stasimopus coronatus is a species of spider in the family Stasimopidae. It is endemic to South Africa and is commonly known as the Kroonstad cork-lid trapdoor spider.

== Distribution ==
Stasimopus coronatus is found in four provinces of South Africa: Free State, Gauteng, Limpopo, and North West. Notable locations include Kroonstad, Kloofendal Nature Reserve, Ellisras (Lephalale), and Mafeking, at altitudes ranging from 1,289 to 1,797 m above sea level.

== Habitat and ecology ==
The species is a ground dweller that lives in a silk-lined burrow closed with a round cork-lid trapdoor. It has been sampled in the Grassland and Savanna biomes.

== Description ==
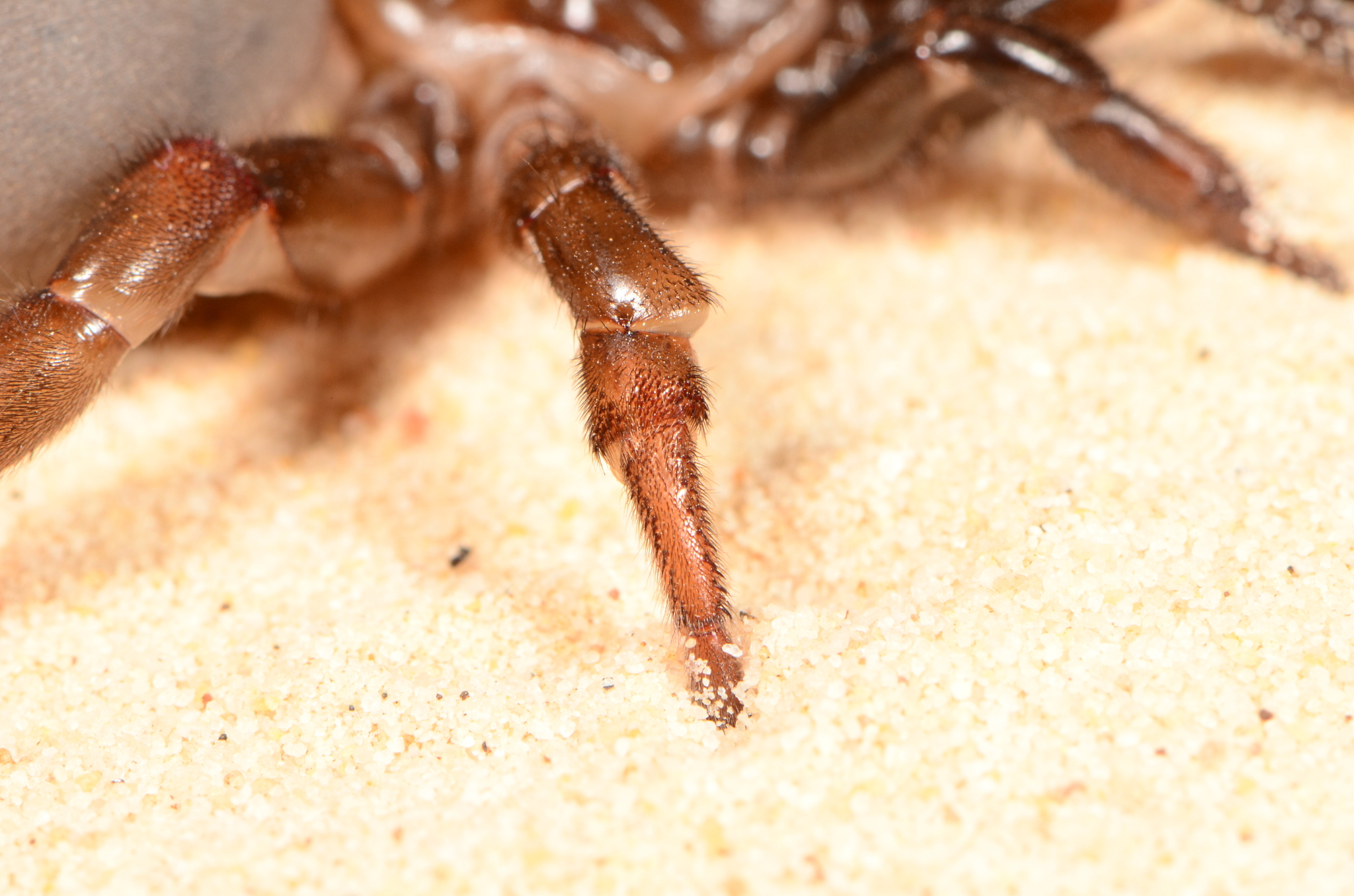
leg detail

Stasimopus coronatus is known only from the female. The carapace and appendages are dark castaneous. The opisthosoma is pale above, only infuscated mesially behind, and dorsally over a narrow median area. There is a patch of red spinules on the anterior surface of patella IV extending over about 1/4 of the length of the anterior surface. Tibia I is very slightly shorter than metatarsus I. Total length is 37 mm.

== Conservation ==
Stasimopus coronatus is listed as Data Deficient for taxonomic reasons by the South African National Biodiversity Institute. Identification of the species remains problematic, and more sampling is needed to collect the male and to determine the species' present range. The species is protected in the Kloofendal Nature Reserve. Threats to this species are unknown.

== Taxonomy ==
The species was originally described by Hewitt in 1915 from Kroonstad. The genus has not yet been revised. This represents the first Stasimopus record from Limpopo.
