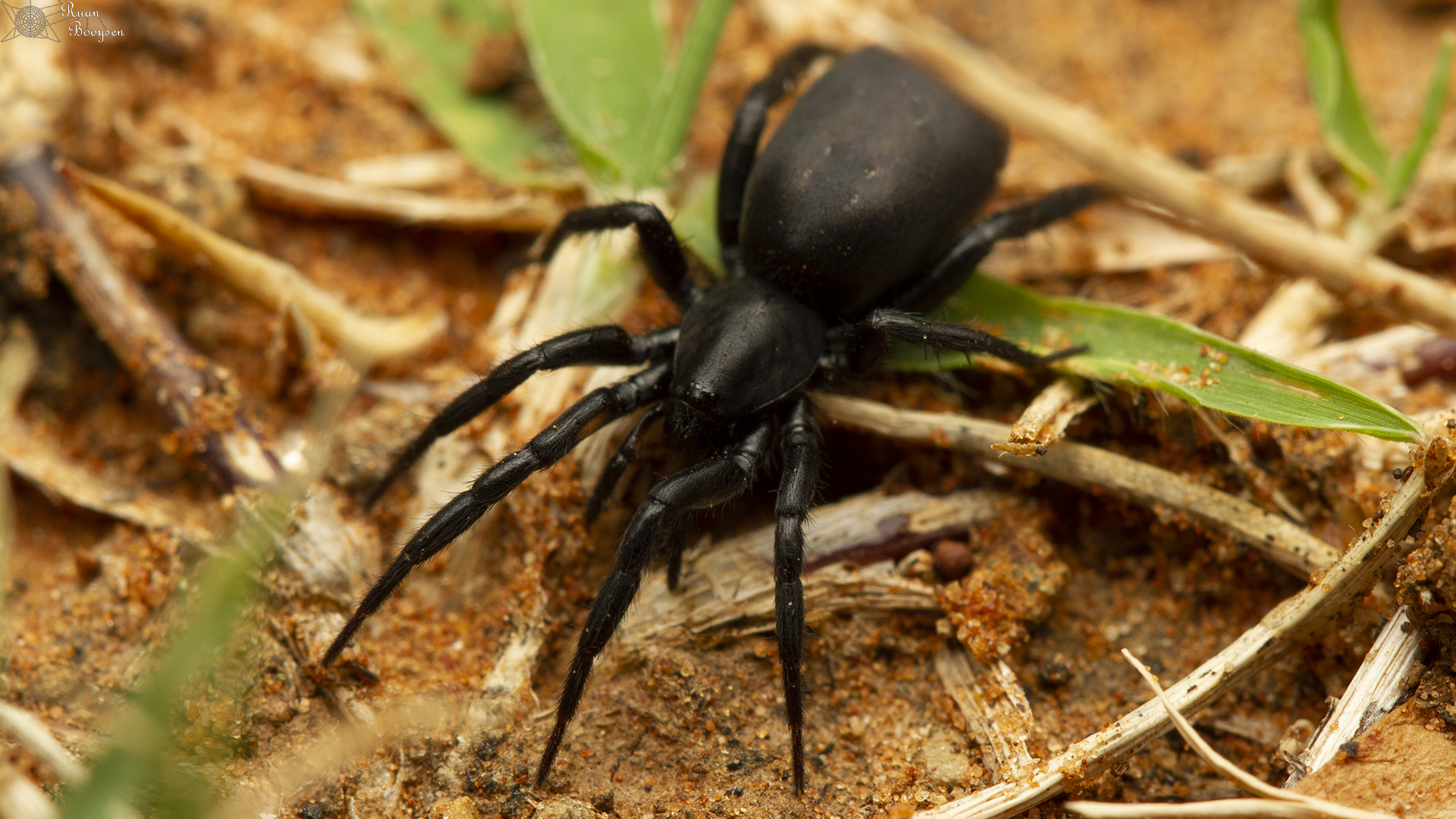
- female
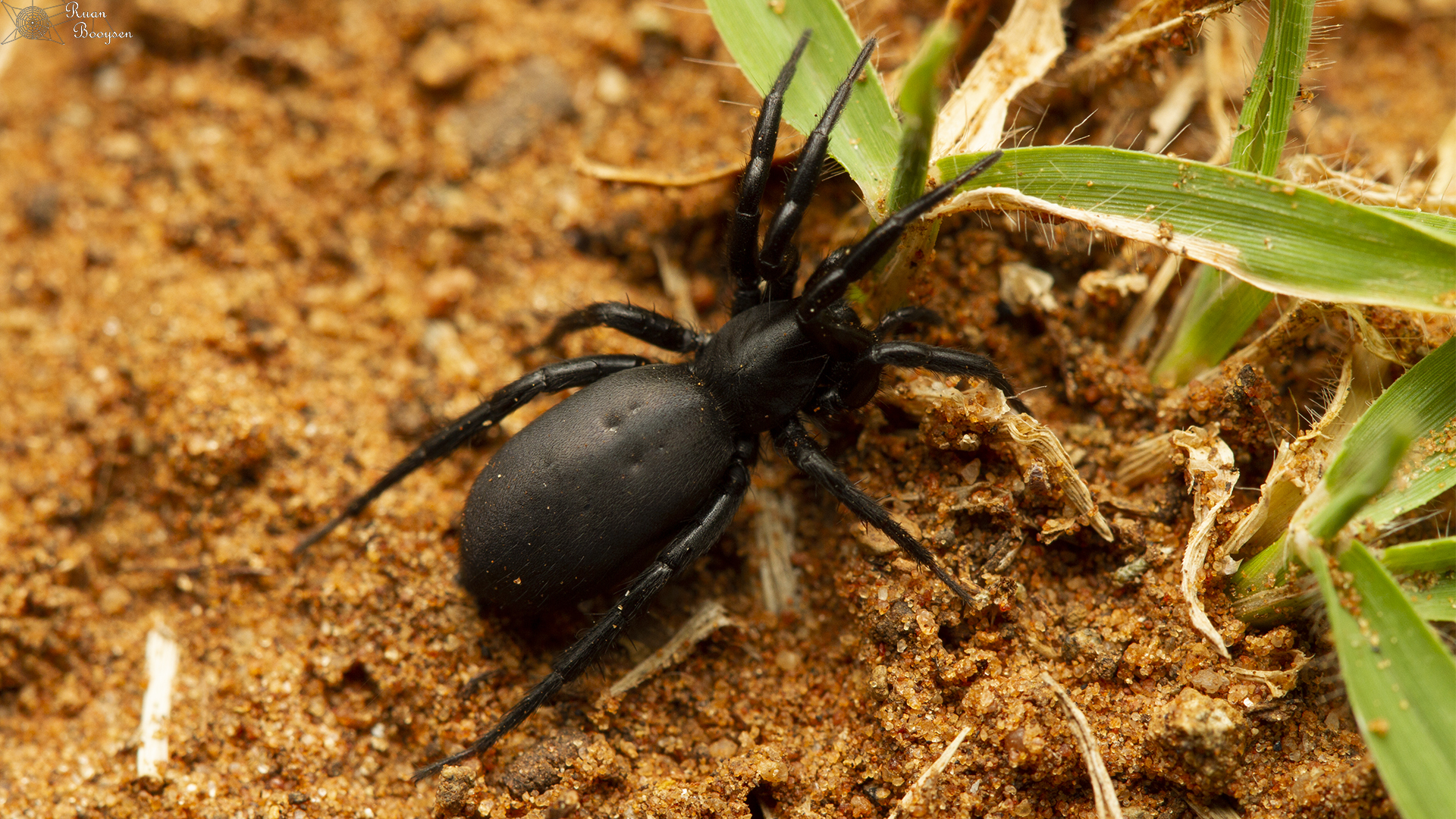
- female

Scientific classification
- Kingdom: Animalia
- Phylum: Arthropoda
- Subphylum: Chelicerata
- Class: Arachnida
- Order: Araneae
- Infraorder: Araneomorphae
- Family: Gnaphosidae
- Genus: Zelotes
- Species: Z. scrutatus

Binomial name
- Zelotes scrutatus (Octavius Pickard-Cambridge, 1872)

Synonyms
- Z. scrutatus synonyms: Drassus scrutatus O. Pickard-Cambridge, 1872; Melanophora picina O. Pickard-Cambridge, 1872; Melanophora scutata O. Pickard-Cambridge, 1872; Prosthesima curina O. Pickard-Cambridge, 1874; Prosthesima impexa Simon, 1886; Melanophora o'neili Purcell, 1907; Setaphis bechuanica Purcell, 1908; Setaphis anchoralis Purcell, 1908; Zelotes oneili Tucker, 1923; Zelotes demonaica Lawrence, 1927; Drassodes cofiniotes Roewer, 1928; Zelotes simplex Denis, 1937; Zelotes sidama Caporiacco, 1941; Zelotes bucharensis Charitonov, 1946

= Zelotes scrutatus =

Species of spider

Zelotes scrutatus is a species of spider in the family Gnaphosidae. It has a wide distribution throughout Africa and beyond.

== Distribution ==
Zelotes scrutatus has a wide distribution throughout Africa, extending to the Canary Islands, Italy (Sicily), Greece, Cyprus, Turkey, and Central Asia. In South Africa, it has been sampled from all provinces.

== Habitat and ecology ==
The species is found from 45 to 1,758 m above sea level. They are free-running ground spiders found under stones during the day and inhabit the Fynbos, Nama Karoo, Thicket, Grassland, and Savanna biomes. Z. scrutatus has also been sampled from citrus and pistachio orchards and cotton, maize, and sunflower fields.

== Conservation ==
Zelotes scrutatus is listed as Least Concern by the South African National Biodiversity Institute due to its wide geographic range. The species is recorded from more than ten protected areas. There are no significant threats to the species.

== Taxonomy ==
The species was originally described by Octavius Pickard-Cambridge in 1872 as Drassus scrutatus. FitzPatrick (2007) revised the species and synonymized numerous species with this taxon, demonstrating its widespread distribution and taxonomic complexity. It is known from both sexes.
