= Stasimopus tysoni =

Scientific classification
- Kingdom: Animalia
- Phylum: Arthropoda
- Subphylum: Chelicerata
- Class: Arachnida
- Order: Araneae
- Infraorder: Mygalomorphae
- Family: Stasimopidae
- Genus: Stasimopus
- Species: S. tysoni

Binomial name
- Stasimopus tysoni Hewitt, 1919

Species of spider

Stasimopus tysoni is a species in the family Stasimopidae. It is endemic to South Africa.

== Distribution ==
Stasimopus tysoni is found in South Africa. The species is known only from the Eastern Cape province, specifically from Port Alfred.

== Habitat and ecology ==
The species is a ground dweller that lives in silk-lined burrows closed with a cork-lid trapdoor. The species has been sampled from the Thicket biome at an altitude of 59 m above sea level.

== Conservation ==
Stasimopus tysoni is listed as Data Deficient by the South African National Biodiversity Institute. The species is an Eastern Cape endemic known only from the type locality at 59 m above sea level. Threats to the species are unknown.

== Taxonomy ==
The species was originally described by John Hewitt in 1919 from Port Alfred. The species has not been revised and is known from both sexes. The status remains obscure and additional sampling is needed to determine the species' range.
