= Stasimopus unispinosus =

Scientific classification
- Kingdom: Animalia
- Phylum: Arthropoda
- Subphylum: Chelicerata
- Class: Arachnida
- Order: Araneae
- Infraorder: Mygalomorphae
- Family: Stasimopidae
- Genus: Stasimopus
- Species: S. unispinosus

Binomial name
- Stasimopus unispinosus Purcell, 1903

Species of spider

Stasimopus unispinosus is a species in the family Stasimopidae. It is endemic to South Africa.

== Distribution ==
Stasimopus unispinosus is found in South Africa. The species occurs in the Northern Cape province at Farm Poortjesfontein, De Aar and Hanover.

== Habitat and ecology ==
The species is a ground dweller that lives in silk-lined burrows closed with a cork-lid trapdoor. The lid is very thick (6-8 mm thick) and cork-like and not strongly beveled at edge with lower edge more rounded. The species has been sampled from the Nama Karoo biome at altitudes between 1242-1358 m above sea level.

== Conservation ==
Stasimopus unispinosus is listed as Data Deficient by the South African National Biodiversity Institute. The species is known from two localities at altitudes of 1242-1358 m above sea level, both sampled prior to 1903. Threats to this species are unknown.

== Taxonomy ==
The species was originally described by W. F. Purcell in 1903 from De Aar. The species has not been revised and is known from both sexes, though not illustrated. The status remains obscure and additional sampling is needed to determine the species' range.
