= Stasimopus qumbu =

Scientific classification
- Kingdom: Animalia
- Phylum: Arthropoda
- Subphylum: Chelicerata
- Class: Arachnida
- Order: Araneae
- Infraorder: Mygalomorphae
- Family: Stasimopidae
- Genus: Stasimopus
- Species: S. qumbu

Binomial name
- Stasimopus qumbu Hewitt, 1913

Synonyms
- Stasimopus gumbu Roewer, 1942 (lapsus)

Species of spider

Stasimopus qumbu is a species in the family Stasimopidae. It is endemic to South Africa.

== Distribution ==
Stasimopus qumbu is found in South Africa. The species is known only from the Eastern Cape province, specifically from Farm Shawbury, Qumbu.

== Habitat and ecology ==
The species is a ground dweller that lives in silk-lined burrows closed with a cork-lid trapdoor. The species has been sampled from the Grassland biome at an altitude of 950 m above sea level.

== Description ==
The species is known from both sexes. In the female, the carapace and legs are dark chestnut brown above and pale beneath, while the abdomen is fuscous above and yellowish below. The patch of red spinules on patella IV is rather small, dorsally covering less than half the length of the segment. There is an absence of apical spinules on the tibia of the pedipalp. Length of carapace is 12.5 mm.

== Conservation ==
Stasimopus qumbu is listed as Data Deficient by the South African National Biodiversity Institute. The species is an Eastern Cape endemic known only from the type locality at 950 m above sea level.

== Taxonomy ==
The species was originally described by John Hewitt in 1913 from Qumbu. The species has not been revised and the status remains obscure. Additional sampling is needed to determine the species' range.
