= Stasimopus suffuscus =

Scientific classification
- Kingdom: Animalia
- Phylum: Arthropoda
- Subphylum: Chelicerata
- Class: Arachnida
- Order: Araneae
- Infraorder: Mygalomorphae
- Family: Stasimopidae
- Genus: Stasimopus
- Species: S. suffuscus

Binomial name
- Stasimopus suffuscus Hewitt, 1916

Species of spider

Stasimopus suffuscus is a species in the family Stasimopidae. It is endemic to South Africa.

== Distribution ==
Stasimopus suffuscus is found in South Africa. The species is known only from Gauteng province, specifically from Beerlaagte, Heidelberg.

== Habitat and ecology ==
The species is a ground dweller that lives in silk-lined burrows closed with a cork-lid trapdoor. The species has been sampled from the Grassland biome at an altitude of 1522 m above sea level.

== Description ==
The species is known only from the female. Eyes are unusually small; posterior median eyes are rounded; carapace and legs are chestnut brown. Total length of female is 33 mm.

== Conservation ==
Stasimopus suffuscus is listed as Data Deficient for taxonomic reasons by the South African National Biodiversity Institute. The species is known only from the type locality at 1522 m above sea level. Threats to the species are unknown.

== Taxonomy ==
The species was originally described by John Hewitt in 1916 from Beerlaagte near Heidelberg. The species has not been revised and is known only from the female. The status remains obscure and additional sampling is needed to collect the male and determine the species' range.
