= Erigonops =

Conservation status
- Vulnerable (IUCN 3.1)

Scientific classification
- Kingdom: Animalia
- Phylum: Arthropoda
- Subphylum: Chelicerata
- Class: Arachnida
- Order: Araneae
- Infraorder: Araneomorphae
- Family: Linyphiidae
- Genus: Erigonops; Scharff, 1990
- Species: E. littoralis

Binomial name
- Erigonops littoralis (Hewitt, 1915)

Synonyms
- Erigonopsis littoralis Hewitt, 1915

Genus of spiders

Erigonops is a monotypic genus in the family Linyphiidae containing only the species Erigonops littoralis, a vulnerable species endemic to South Africa.

== Taxonomy and history ==
The genus Erigonopsis and its sole species Erigonopsis littoralis were described by John Hewitt in 1915 based on several adult specimens collected at Muizenberg in September of 1914. The genus would later be renamed Erigonops by Nickolaj Scharff in 1990, as Erigonopsis was a preoccupied name already used to refer to a genus of flies described by Charles Henry Tyler Townsend in 1912.

== Distribution and habitat ==
Erigonops littoralis is known only from three locations in the Western Cape province of South Africa. It lives in the intertidal zone of rocky shores and surrounding habitats along the coast.
