= Stasimopus gigas =

Scientific classification
- Kingdom: Animalia
- Phylum: Arthropoda
- Subphylum: Chelicerata
- Class: Arachnida
- Order: Araneae
- Infraorder: Mygalomorphae
- Family: Stasimopidae
- Genus: Stasimopus
- Species: S. gigas

Binomial name
- Stasimopus gigas Hewitt, 1915

Species of spider

Stasimopus gigas is a species of spider in the family Stasimopidae. It is endemic to South Africa and is commonly known as the Venterskroon cork-lid trapdoor spider.

== Distribution ==
Stasimopus gigas is found in the Free State and North West provinces of South Africa. It occurs at Vredefort (Barrett-Hamilton) and Venterskroon (Vredefort road), at altitudes ranging from 1,343 to 1,418 m above sea level.

== Habitat and ecology ==
The species lives in silk-lined burrows closed with a cork-lid trapdoor. It has been sampled from the Grassland biome.

== Description ==
Stasimopus gigas is known from both sexes. Total length is 36 mm.

== Conservation ==
Stasimopus gigas is listed as Data Deficient by the South African National Biodiversity Institute. The species is presently known only from two localities sampled prior to 1915. Identification of the species remains problematic and the status of the species remains obscure. The type locality has an ongoing threat of habitat loss due to crop farming. More sampling is needed to determine the species' range.

== Taxonomy ==
The species was originally described by Hewitt in 1915 from Venterskroon. The genus has not yet been revised.
