= Stasimopus caffrus =

Scientific classification
- Kingdom: Animalia
- Phylum: Arthropoda
- Subphylum: Chelicerata
- Class: Arachnida
- Order: Araneae
- Infraorder: Mygalomorphae
- Family: Stasimopidae
- Genus: Stasimopus
- Species: S. caffrus

Binomial name
- Stasimopus caffrus (C. L. Koch, 1842)

Species of spider

Stasimopus caffrus is a species of spider in the family Stasimopidae. It is endemic to South Africa. This is the type species of the genus Stasimopus.

== Distribution ==
Stasimopus caffrus is known only from the type locality stated as Cape of Good Hope in the Western Cape province of South Africa, at an altitude of 333 m above sea level.

== Habitat and ecology ==
The species is a ground dweller that lives in silk-lined burrows in the Fynbos biome, closed with a thick trapdoor lid.

== Conservation ==
Stasimopus caffrus is listed as Data Deficient for taxonomic reasons by the South African National Biodiversity Institute. The status of the species remains obscure. More sampling is needed to collect the male and to determine the species' present range. Threats to this species are unknown.

== Taxonomy ==
The species was originally described by C. L. Koch in 1842 as Actinopus caffrus. It serves as the type species for the genus Stasimopus. The genus has not yet been revised.
