= Stasimopus artifex =

Scientific classification
- Kingdom: Animalia
- Phylum: Arthropoda
- Subphylum: Chelicerata
- Class: Arachnida
- Order: Araneae
- Infraorder: Mygalomorphae
- Family: Stasimopidae
- Genus: Stasimopus
- Species: S. artifex

Binomial name
- Stasimopus artifex Pocock, 1902

Species of spider

Stasimopus artifex is a species of spider in the family Stasimopidae. It is endemic to South Africa.

== Distribution ==
Stasimopus artifex is found in the Eastern Cape province of South Africa. Notable locations include Bathurst at Rokeby Park and Pigs Island, Seaview, and Grahamstown at Cuylerville.

== Habitat and ecology ==
The species is a ground dweller that lives in silk-lined burrows closed with a thick trapdoor lid. It has been sampled from the Savanna and Thicket biomes.

== Conservation ==
Stasimopus artifex is listed as Data Deficient for taxonomic reasons by the South African National Biodiversity Institute. The species is known from three localities sampled prior to 1902. It is suspected to be under-collected since trapdoor spiders are not easy to locate. The species is likely threatened by habitat loss due to urbanization at Bathurst and Seaview, and crop farming at Bathurst.

== Taxonomy ==
The species was originally described by Pocock in 1902 from Cuylerville, near Grahamstown. The genus has not yet been revised, and identification of the species remains problematic. The male remains unknown.
