= Stasimopus schultzei =

Scientific classification
- Kingdom: Animalia
- Phylum: Arthropoda
- Subphylum: Chelicerata
- Class: Arachnida
- Order: Araneae
- Infraorder: Mygalomorphae
- Family: Stasimopidae
- Genus: Stasimopus
- Species: S. schultzei

Binomial name
- Stasimopus schultzei Purcell, 1908

Species of spider

Stasimopus schultzei is a species in the family Stasimopidae. It is endemic to South Africa.

== Distribution ==
Stasimopus schultzei is found in South Africa. The species occurs in the Northern Cape province at Steinkopf, Richtersveld National Park, and Namaqua National Park.

== Habitat and ecology ==
The species is a ground dweller that lives in silk-lined burrows closed with a cork-lid trapdoor. The species has been sampled from the Desert and Succulent biomes at altitudes between 14 and 870 m above sea level.

== Conservation ==
Stasimopus schultzei is listed as Data Deficient for taxonomic reasons by the South African National Biodiversity Institute. The species is a Northern Cape endemic that has been more recently sampled in the Richtersveld National Park and Namaqua National Park at altitudes of 14–870 m above sea level. Threats to the species are unknown.

== Taxonomy ==
The species was originally described by W. F. Purcell in 1908 from Steinkopf. The species has not been revised and is known only from the female. The status of the species remains obscure and additional sampling is needed to collect the male and determine the species range.
