= Stasimopus leipoldti =

Scientific classification
- Kingdom: Animalia
- Phylum: Arthropoda
- Subphylum: Chelicerata
- Class: Arachnida
- Order: Araneae
- Infraorder: Mygalomorphae
- Family: Stasimopidae
- Genus: Stasimopus
- Species: S. leipoldti

Binomial name
- Stasimopus leipoldti Purcell, 1902

Species of spider

Stasimopus leipoldti is a species of spider in the family Stasimopidae. It is endemic to South Africa.

== Distribution ==
Stasimopus leipoldti is endemic to the Western Cape province of South Africa. It is known only from the type locality in Clanwilliam at an altitude of 83 m above sea level.

== Habitat and ecology ==
The species inhabits the Fynbos biome. Stasimopus leipoldti is a ground dweller that constructs silk-lined burrows closed with a cork-lid trapdoor.

== Conservation ==
Stasimopus leipoldti is listed as Data Deficient for taxonomic reasons. The species was described by Purcell in 1902 from the type locality, collected around 1900 in Clanwilliam, an urbanized area surrounded by crop farming. It has a very restricted distribution range. The status of the species remains obscure, and more sampling is needed to collect males and determine the species' full range.

== Taxonomy ==
The species was originally described by Purcell in 1902 from Clanwilliam. It has not been revised since its original description and remains known only from the female specimen.
