= Stasimopus kolbei =

Scientific classification
- Kingdom: Animalia
- Phylum: Arthropoda
- Subphylum: Chelicerata
- Class: Arachnida
- Order: Araneae
- Infraorder: Mygalomorphae
- Family: Stasimopidae
- Genus: Stasimopus
- Species: S. kolbei

Binomial name
- Stasimopus kolbei Purcell, 1903

Species of spider

Stasimopus kolbei is a species of spider in the family Stasimopidae. It is endemic to South Africa.

== Distribution ==
Stasimopus kolbei is endemic to the Eastern Cape province of South Africa. It is known only from the type locality at Qoloro River Mouth, Kentani, at an altitude of 9 m above sea level.

== Habitat and ecology ==
The species inhabits the Thicket biome. Stasimopus kolbei constructs silk-lined burrows closed with a cork-lid door. The lid is thick and cork-shaped with a broad hinge. The peripheral surface is strongly marked and the lid edge is scarcely bevelled, except on the hinge side. The underside is flattened with pits almost obliterated.

== Conservation ==
Stasimopus kolbei is listed as Data Deficient for taxonomic reasons by the IUCN. The species has a very restricted distribution range with an extent of occurrence less than 100 km² and an area of occupancy of 4 km². The type locality faces habitat degradation threats due to cattle grazing. The status of the species remains obscure, and more sampling is needed to collect males and determine the species' full range.

== Taxonomy ==
The species was originally described by Purcell in 1903 from the type locality in Kentani. It has not been revised since its original description and remains known only from the female specimen.
