= Stasimopus griswoldi =

Griswold's Cork-Lid Trapdoor Spider

Conservation status
- Endangered (SANBI Red List)

Scientific classification
- Kingdom: Animalia
- Phylum: Arthropoda
- Subphylum: Chelicerata
- Class: Arachnida
- Order: Araneae
- Infraorder: Mygalomorphae
- Family: Stasimopidae
- Genus: Stasimopus
- Species: S. griswoldi

Binomial name
- Stasimopus griswoldi Engelbrecht & Prendini, 2012

Species of spider

Stasimopus griswoldi is a species of spider in the family Stasimopidae. It is endemic to South Africa and is commonly known as Griswold's cork-lid trapdoor spider.

== Distribution ==
Stasimopus griswoldi is found in the North West province of South Africa. It occurs at Kommandonek on the southern slopes of the Magaliesberg, the Hartebeesfontein Conservancy, and Hekpoort, at altitudes ranging from 1,187 to 1,389 m above sea level.

== Habitat and ecology ==
The species is a ground dweller that lives in silk-lined burrows closed with a cork-lid door. It has been sampled from the Grassland biome.

== Description ==
Stasimopus griswoldi is known from both sexes. The female chelicerae are uniformly black. Leg III metatarsus is black proximally, and leg IV metatarsus is mostly black, becoming paler distally. Book lung covers are yellow or black, with the anterior pair always pale and the posterior pair black in some specimens. The genital plate, between anterior book lungs, is paler than the rest of the opisthosoma or similar in color to pale book lung coverings, creating a pale band across the antero-ventral part of the opisthosoma.

== Conservation ==
Stasimopus griswoldi is listed as Endangered under the B criterion by the South African National Biodiversity Institute. It is known from fewer than five locations and experiences ongoing loss of habitat to crop cultivation and urban development. Although approximately 46% of the habitat in the valley inhabited by this species has been transformed, primarily for agriculture, the species appears to persist on relatively small patches of natural habitat, especially in rocky areas unsuitable for agriculture. Habitat destruction associated with urban and infrastructural developments spreading westward from the recreational areas around Hartebeespoort Dam represents an ongoing threat to the species.

== Etymology ==
The species is named after arachnologist Charles E. Griswold.

== Taxonomy ==
The species was described by Engelbrecht & Prendini in 2012 from the Brits district.
