= Stasimopus rufidens =

Scientific classification
- Kingdom: Animalia
- Phylum: Arthropoda
- Subphylum: Chelicerata
- Class: Arachnida
- Order: Araneae
- Infraorder: Mygalomorphae
- Family: Stasimopidae
- Genus: Stasimopus
- Species: S. rufidens

Binomial name
- Stasimopus rufidens (Ausserer, 1871)

Synonyms
- Cyrtocarenum rufidens Ausserer, 1871; Pachylomerus natalensis O. Pickard-Cambridge, 1889

Species of spider

Stasimopus rufidens is a species in the family Stasimopidae. It is endemic to South Africa.

== Distribution ==
Stasimopus rufidens is found in South Africa. The species is found in KwaZulu-Natal province at Durban, Estcourt, Mooirivier, and Phinda Game Reserve.

== Habitat and ecology ==
The species is a ground dweller that lives in silk-lined burrows closed with a cork-lid trapdoor. The species has been sampled from the Savanna biome at altitudes between 148-1447 m above sea level.

== Description ==
The species is known only from the female. The carapace is dark brown and shiny. The abdomen is short-oval, very convex, of a mouse-colour, clothed with very short hairs. The legs are short, very strong, with leg formula 4, 1, 3, 2, similar in colour to the cephalothorax, furnished with hairs, and numerous short strong spines near the sides of the tarsi and metatarsi of the first and second pairs.

== Conservation ==
Stasimopus rufidens is listed as Data Deficient for taxonomic reasons by the South African National Biodiversity Institute. The species is threatened by loss of habitat for urbanization around Durban and crop farming around Estcourt. It is protected in the Phinda Game Reserve. The species is known from three localities at altitudes of 148-1447 m above sea level, with most specimens sampled prior to 1898.

== Taxonomy ==
The species was originally described by Anton Ausserer in 1871 as Cyrtocarenum rufidens from Port Natal (Durban). The species has not been revised and remains known only from the female. Additional sampling is needed to collect the male and determine the species' range.
