= Stasimopus purcelli =

Scientific classification
- Kingdom: Animalia
- Phylum: Arthropoda
- Subphylum: Chelicerata
- Class: Arachnida
- Order: Araneae
- Infraorder: Mygalomorphae
- Family: Stasimopidae
- Genus: Stasimopus
- Species: S. purcelli

Binomial name
- Stasimopus purcelli Tucker, 1917

Species of spider

Stasimopus purcelli is a species of spider in the family Stasimopidae. It is endemic to South Africa.

== Etymology ==
The species is named after William Frederick Purcell, a prominent South African arachnologist who described many spider species from the region.

== Distribution ==
Stasimopus purcelli is endemic to the Western Cape province of South Africa. It is known only from Caledon at an altitude of 217 m above sea level.

== Habitat and ecology ==
The species inhabits the Fynbos biome. Stasimopus purcelli is a ground dweller that constructs silk-lined burrows closed with a cork-lid trapdoor.

== Conservation ==
Stasimopus purcelli is listed as Data Deficient for taxonomic reasons. The species has a very restricted distribution range. The type locality and surrounding areas are threatened by habitat loss due to wheat farming and housing development. The status of the species remains obscure, and more sampling is needed to collect females and determine the species' full range.

== Taxonomy ==
The species was originally described by Tucker in 1917 from Caledon. It has not been revised since its original description and remains known only from male specimens.
