= Stasimopus castaneus =

Scientific classification
- Kingdom: Animalia
- Phylum: Arthropoda
- Subphylum: Chelicerata
- Class: Arachnida
- Order: Araneae
- Infraorder: Mygalomorphae
- Family: Stasimopidae
- Genus: Stasimopus
- Species: S. castaneus

Binomial name
- Stasimopus castaneus Purcell, 1903

Species of spider

Stasimopus castaneus is a species of spider in the family Stasimopidae. It is endemic to South Africa.

== Distribution ==
Stasimopus castaneus is found in the Eastern Cape province of South Africa. It is known only from the type locality at Port Elizabeth at an altitude of 17 m above sea level.

== Habitat and ecology ==
The species is a ground dweller that lives in silk-lined burrows closed with a thick trapdoor lid. It has been sampled in the Thicket biome.

== Description ==
Stasimopus castaneus is known only from a female. The carapace is dark brown, only slightly paler posteriorly. The chelicerae, pedipalps, and legs are dark reddish brown, with the two posterior pairs of legs paler and more yellowish below. The sternum is dark brown, pale yellowish posteriorly. The opisthosoma is dirty yellowish.

== Conservation ==
Stasimopus castaneus is listed as Data Deficient for taxonomic reasons by the South African National Biodiversity Institute. The status of the species remains obscure, and more sampling is needed to collect the male and to determine the species' present range. There has been extensive habitat loss to urban development at the type locality.

== Taxonomy ==
The species was originally described by Purcell in 1903 from Port Elizabeth. The genus has not yet been revised.
