= Stasimopus patersonae =

Scientific classification
- Kingdom: Animalia
- Phylum: Arthropoda
- Subphylum: Chelicerata
- Class: Arachnida
- Order: Araneae
- Infraorder: Mygalomorphae
- Family: Stasimopidae
- Genus: Stasimopus
- Species: S. patersonae

Binomial name
- Stasimopus patersonae Hewitt, 1913

Species of spider

Stasimopus patersonae is a species of spider in the family Stasimopidae. It is endemic to South Africa.

== Distribution ==
Stasimopus patersonae is endemic to South Africa.

== Taxonomy ==
The species was originally described by Hewitt in 1913.
