= Stasimopus filmeri =

Horned Cork-Lid Trapdoor Spider

Conservation status
- Endangered (SANBI Red List)

Scientific classification
- Kingdom: Animalia
- Phylum: Arthropoda
- Subphylum: Chelicerata
- Class: Arachnida
- Order: Araneae
- Infraorder: Mygalomorphae
- Family: Stasimopidae
- Genus: Stasimopus
- Species: S. filmeri

Binomial name
- Stasimopus filmeri Engelbrecht & Prendini, 2012

Species of spider

Stasimopus filmeri is a species of spider in the family Stasimopidae. It is endemic to South Africa and is commonly known as the horned cork-lid trapdoor spider.

== Distribution ==
Stasimopus filmeri is found in the Gauteng and North West provinces of South Africa. It occurs at Mohalesgate, Broederstroom, and the Hartebeesfontein Conservancy, at altitudes ranging from 1,245 to 1,398 m above sea level.

== Habitat and ecology ==
The species is a ground dweller that lives in silk-lined burrows closed with a cork-lid trapdoor. It has been sampled from the Grassland biome.

== Description ==
Stasimopus filmeri is known from both sexes.

== Conservation ==
Stasimopus filmeri is listed as Endangered by the South African National Biodiversity Institute. It is recorded from fewer than five locations and experiences ongoing loss of habitat within its range due to urban development and crop cultivation. The species is threatened by habitat loss to urban development and crop farming around Hartebeespoort. More sampling is needed to determine the full range.

== Taxonomy ==
The species was described by Engelbrecht & Prendini in 2012 from the Krugersdorp district.
