= Stasimopus insculptus =

Scientific classification
- Kingdom: Animalia
- Phylum: Arthropoda
- Subphylum: Chelicerata
- Class: Arachnida
- Order: Araneae
- Infraorder: Mygalomorphae
- Family: Stasimopidae
- Genus: Stasimopus
- Species: S. insculptus

Binomial name
- Stasimopus insculptus Pocock, 1901

Species of spider

Stasimopus insculptus is a species of spider in the family Stasimopidae. It is endemic to South Africa.

== Distribution ==
Stasimopus insculptus is found in the Eastern Cape province of South Africa. It occurs at King William's Town (including Pirie Forest), Peddie, and King William's Town, at altitudes ranging from 349 to 1,257 m above sea level.

== Habitat and ecology ==
The species is a ground dweller that lives in silk-lined burrows closed with a cork-lid trapdoor. It has been sampled from the thicket biome.

== Description ==
Stasimopus insculptus is known from both sexes. The male has carapace and mouthparts that are black, with legs deep brown with reddish-yellow tarsi and metatarsi. The opisthosoma is yellowish brown. Total length is 16 mm.

== Conservation ==
Stasimopus insculptus is listed as Data Deficient by the South African National Biodiversity Institute. The species is presently known from three localities in a restricted range and was sampled prior to 1901. Identification of the species remains problematic and the status of the species remains obscure. More sampling is needed to determine the species' range.

== Taxonomy ==
The species was originally described by Pocock in 1901 from King William's Town. The genus has not yet been revised.
