= Stasimopus oculatus =

Common Cork-Lid Trapdoor Spider

Conservation status
- Least Concern (SANBI Red List)

Scientific classification
- Kingdom: Animalia
- Phylum: Arthropoda
- Subphylum: Chelicerata
- Class: Arachnida
- Order: Araneae
- Infraorder: Mygalomorphae
- Family: Stasimopidae
- Genus: Stasimopus
- Species: S. oculatus

Binomial name
- Stasimopus oculatus Pocock, 1897

Species of spider

Stasimopus oculatus is a species of spider in the family Stasimopidae. It is endemic to South Africa and is commonly known as common cork-lid trapdoor spider.

== Distribution ==
Stasimopus oculatus has a wide distribution across five South African provinces: Free State, Gauteng, Limpopo, Mpumalanga, Northern Cape, and North West. Notable locations include multiple sites around Bloemfontein, various nature reserves, and areas near Pretoria. The species occurs at altitudes ranging from 397 to 1628 m above sea level.

== Habitat and ecology ==
The species inhabits the Grassland and Savanna biomes. Stasimopus oculatus is a ground dweller that constructs silk-lined burrows closed with a cork-lid trapdoor. The lid is thick and D-shaped with a bevelled edge. The burrow width ranges from 30–60 mm at the entrance and 23–50 mm lower down, and is thickly lined with silk. The upper surface of the lid is coated with mud.

Neethling & Haddad (2019) sampled 48 specimens over 10 months from the Free State National Botanical Garden. Average minimum daily temperature had a significant effect on the activity pattern of the species, with activity occurring from mid-November to the end of March. The species has been found associated with termites (Trinervitermis trinervoides) in the Free State.

== Description ==
Stasimopus oculatus is known only from females. The carapace is yellowish brown, with legs and chelicerae slightly darker. The chelicerae have copper-red setae near the extremity. The dorsal surface of the abdomen is pale with a dark mesial purplish blotch. Total length of females is 30 mm. Males have been collected but not yet described.

== Conservation ==
Stasimopus oculatus is listed as Least Concern by the South African National Biodiversity Institute. The species has a wide geographical range. There are no significant threats to the species. It is protected in multiple nature reserves including Erfenisdam Nature Reserve, Amanzi Private Game Reserve, Groenkloof Nature Reserve, Roodeplaatdam Nature Reserve, and Free State National Botanical Garden.

== Taxonomy ==
The species was originally described by Pocock in 1897 from Bloemfontein. It has not been revised since its original description and remains known only from female specimens, although males have been collected but not yet described.
