= Stasimopus quadratimaculatus =

Scientific classification
- Kingdom: Animalia
- Phylum: Arthropoda
- Subphylum: Chelicerata
- Class: Arachnida
- Order: Araneae
- Infraorder: Mygalomorphae
- Family: Stasimopidae
- Genus: Stasimopus
- Species: S. quadratimaculatus

Binomial name
- Stasimopus quadratimaculatus Purcell, 1903

Species of spider

Stasimopus quadratimaculatus is a species in the family Stasimopidae. It is endemic to South Africa.

== Distribution ==
Stasimopus quadratimaculatus is found in South Africa. The species is known only from the Western Cape province, specifically from Montagu Baths near Montagu.

== Habitat and ecology ==
The species is a ground dweller that lives in silk-lined burrows closed with a cork-lid trapdoor. The lid is very thick (5.5–9 mm), cork-like and not strongly bevelled at the edge with the lower edge more angular. The burrow width at entrance is 23–28 mm while the width narrows to 16–18 mm. The depth of the burrow is 18–19 cm. The species has been sampled from the Fynbos biome at an altitude of 268 m above sea level.

== Conservation ==
Stasimopus quadratimaculatus is listed as Data Deficient for taxonomic reasons by the South African National Biodiversity Institute. The species is a Western Cape endemic known only from the type locality, an area threatened by loss of habitat due to urbanization and agricultural activity.

== Taxonomy ==
The species was originally described by W. F. Purcell in 1903 from the Hot Baths near Montagu in the Western Cape. The species has not been revised and remains poorly known, with the status remaining obscure. Additional sampling is needed to collect the male and determine the species' range.
