= Stasimopus erythrognathus =

Scientific classification
- Kingdom: Animalia
- Phylum: Arthropoda
- Subphylum: Chelicerata
- Class: Arachnida
- Order: Araneae
- Infraorder: Mygalomorphae
- Family: Stasimopidae
- Genus: Stasimopus
- Species: S. erythrognathus

Binomial name
- Stasimopus erythrognathus Purcell, 1903

Species of spider

Stasimopus erythrognathus is a species of spider in the family Stasimopidae. It is endemic to South Africa and is commonly known as the Worcester cork-lid trapdoor spider.

== Distribution ==
Stasimopus erythrognathus is found in the Western Cape province of South Africa. It is known only from the type locality at Worcester at an altitude of 244 m above sea level.

== Habitat and ecology ==
The species is a ground dweller that lives in silk-lined burrows closed with a cork-lid trapdoor. The trapdoor has a lid width of 30 mm with a hinge width of 6 mm and an average thickness of 4.5 mm. The upper part of burrows are more funnel-shaped. It has been sampled in the Fynbos biome.

== Description ==
Stasimopus erythrognathus is known from both sexes. The female carapace is brown, yellowish posteriorly. The chelicerae are reddish brown. The pedipalps and legs are brown, with the two posterior pairs yellowish below and also in places above. The coxae of legs and posterior part of sternum are more or less ochraceous, with the coxa of pedipalp reddish. The anterior part of sternum is fuscous brown.

The opisthosoma is dirty pale yellowish, with a broad dark patch above along the middle. The posterior lateral eyes are much larger than the medians. Total length is 36 mm.

The male carapace and appendages are brown, without infuscation except to a slight extent in the ocular area. The tibia of pedipalps is pale. The opisthosoma is dark above, pale below. Coxae of pedipalps and first two pairs of legs inferiorly are castaneous, otherwise the legs are brown below like the sternum.

== Conservation ==
Stasimopus erythrognathus is listed as Data Deficient by the South African National Biodiversity Institute. The status of the species remains obscure, and more sampling is needed to determine the species' present range. There has been extensive loss of habitat due to urbanization and agriculture at the type location.

== Taxonomy ==
The species was originally described by Purcell in 1903 from Worcester. The genus has not yet been revised.
