= Stasimopus umtaticus =

Scientific classification
- Kingdom: Animalia
- Phylum: Arthropoda
- Subphylum: Chelicerata
- Class: Arachnida
- Order: Araneae
- Infraorder: Mygalomorphae
- Family: Stasimopidae
- Genus: Stasimopus
- Species: S. umtaticus

Binomial name
- Stasimopus umtaticus Purcell, 1903

Species of spider

Stasimopus umtaticus is a species in the family Stasimopidae. It is endemic to South Africa.

== Distribution ==
Stasimopus umtaticus is found in South Africa. The species is known only from the Eastern Cape province, specifically from Umtata.

== Habitat and ecology ==
The species is a ground dweller that lives in silk-lined burrows closed with a cork-lid trapdoor. The species has been sampled from the Grassland and Thicket biomes at altitudes between 671 and 674 m above sea level.

== Conservation ==
Stasimopus umtaticus is listed as Data Deficient for taxonomic reasons by the South African National Biodiversity Institute. The species is an Eastern Cape endemic known only from the type locality at altitudes of 671-674 m above sea level.

== Taxonomy ==
The species was originally described by W. F. Purcell in 1903 from Umtata. The species has not been revised and is known only from the female. The status remains obscure and additional sampling is needed to collect the male and determine the species' range.
