= Stasimopus nigellus =

Scientific classification
- Kingdom: Animalia
- Phylum: Arthropoda
- Subphylum: Chelicerata
- Class: Arachnida
- Order: Araneae
- Infraorder: Mygalomorphae
- Family: Stasimopidae
- Genus: Stasimopus
- Species: S. nigellus

Binomial name
- Stasimopus nigellus Pocock, 1902

Species of spider

Stasimopus nigellus is a species of spider in the family Stasimopidae. It is endemic to South Africa and is commonly known as Vredeford cork-lid trapdoor spider.

== Etymology ==
The species name nigellus means "blackish" in Latin, likely referring to the dark coloration of this spider.

== Distribution ==
Stasimopus nigellus is found in the Free State and North West provinces of South Africa. It occurs at Vredeford Road and Venterskroon in the Free State, and at Potchefstroom in the North West province. The species is found at altitudes ranging from 1349 to 1563 m above sea level.

== Habitat and ecology ==
The species inhabits the Grassland and Savanna biomes. Stasimopus nigellus is a ground dweller that constructs silk-lined burrows closed with a cork-lid trapdoor.

== Description ==
Stasimopus nigellus is known from both sexes. Males are jet-black, with the tarsi and distal end of the metatarsi yellowish red. They are paler brownish beneath, with the genital plate and opercula testaceous. The carapace is coarsely rugose, with a total length of 9 mm. Females have a castaneous carapace and a pale abdomen that is only infuscated mesially behind, with a total length of 36 mm.

== Conservation ==
Stasimopus nigellus is listed as Data Deficient. The status of the species remains obscure, and more sampling is needed to determine the species' full range.

== Taxonomy ==
The species was originally described by Pocock in 1902 from the Vredeford Road in the Free State. It has not been revised since its original description and is known from both sexes.
