= Stasimopus minor =

Scientific classification
- Kingdom: Animalia
- Phylum: Arthropoda
- Subphylum: Chelicerata
- Class: Arachnida
- Order: Araneae
- Infraorder: Mygalomorphae
- Family: Stasimopidae
- Genus: Stasimopus
- Species: S. minor

Binomial name
- Stasimopus minor Hewitt, 1915

Species of spider

Stasimopus minor is a species of spider in the family Stasimopidae. It is endemic to South Africa.

== Etymology ==
The species name minor refers to the small size of this spider species.

== Distribution ==
Stasimopus minor is endemic to the Free State province of South Africa. It is found at Bloemfontein, Amanzi Private Game Reserve, Mpetsane Conservation Estate near Clocolan, and the National Botanical Garden. The species occurs at altitudes ranging from 1357 to 1663 m above sea level.

== Habitat and ecology ==
The species inhabits the Grassland biome. Stasimopus minor is a ground dweller that constructs silk-lined burrows closed with a cork-lid trapdoor. Research by Neethling & Haddad (2019) found that 25 specimens were sampled over a period of 10 months from the Free State National Botanical Garden. Average maximum daily temperature had a significant effect on the activity pattern of the species. It was only active in autumn, from mid-March to the end of May, when the study ended.

== Conservation ==
Stasimopus minor is listed as Data Deficient for taxonomic reasons. The status of the species remains obscure, and more sampling is needed to collect females and determine the species' full range. It is protected in Amanzi Private Game Reserve, Free State National Botanical Garden, and Mpetsane Conservation Estate.

== Taxonomy ==
The species was originally described by Hewitt in 1915 from Bloemfontein. It has not been revised since its original description and remains known only from male specimens. The female has been collected but not yet described.
