= Stasimopus longipalpis =

Scientific classification
- Kingdom: Animalia
- Phylum: Arthropoda
- Subphylum: Chelicerata
- Class: Arachnida
- Order: Araneae
- Infraorder: Mygalomorphae
- Family: Stasimopidae
- Genus: Stasimopus
- Species: S. longipalpis

Binomial name
- Stasimopus longipalpis Hewitt, 1917

Species of spider

Stasimopus longipalpis is a species of spider in the family Stasimopidae. It is endemic to South Africa.

== Etymology ==
The species name longipalpis refers to the long pedipalps observed in this species.

== Distribution ==
Stasimopus longipalpis is found in the Free State and Northern Cape provinces of South Africa. It occurs at Kalkfontein Dam Nature Reserve and Mpetsane Conservation Estate near Clocolan in the Free State, and near Kimberley in the Northern Cape. The species is found at altitudes ranging from 1217 m above sea level.

== Habitat and ecology ==
The species inhabits the Grassland and Savanna biomes. Stasimopus longipalpis is a ground dweller that constructs silk-lined burrows closed with a cork-lid trapdoor.

== Description ==
Stasimopus longipalpis is known only from males. The carapace ranges from dark brown to pale brown, with legs also brown. The two anterior pairs of legs and the pedipalps are somewhat darker than the posterior two pairs, except for the distal portions of those appendages, which are pale. Total length is 11 mm.

== Conservation ==
Stasimopus longipalpis is listed as Data Deficient for taxonomic reasons. The species has an extent of occurrence less than 1000 km² and an area of occupancy of 4 km². The type locality faces habitat loss threats due to urbanization and mining activities. The status of the species remains obscure, and more sampling is needed to collect females and determine the species' full range.

== Taxonomy ==
The species was originally described by Hewitt in 1917 from Kimberley. It has not been revised since its original description and remains known only from male specimens.
