= Stasimopus nanus =

Scientific classification
- Kingdom: Animalia
- Phylum: Arthropoda
- Subphylum: Chelicerata
- Class: Arachnida
- Order: Araneae
- Infraorder: Mygalomorphae
- Family: Stasimopidae
- Genus: Stasimopus
- Species: S. nanus

Binomial name
- Stasimopus nanus Tucker, 1917

Species of spider

Stasimopus nanus is a species of spider in the family Stasimopidae. It is endemic to South Africa.

== Distribution ==
Stasimopus nanus is endemic to the Free State province of South Africa. It is known only from the type locality at Smithfield at an altitude of 1405 m above sea level.

== Habitat and ecology ==
The species inhabits the Grassland biome. Stasimopus nanus is a ground dweller that constructs silk-lined burrows closed with a cork-lid trapdoor.

== Conservation ==
Stasimopus nanus is listed as Data Deficient for taxonomic reasons. The species has a very restricted distribution range. The type locality faces a low level threat of habitat loss to housing development. The status of the species remains obscure, and more sampling is needed to collect males and determine the species' full range.

== Etymology ==
The species name nanus means "dwarf" in Latin.

== Taxonomy ==
The species was originally described by Tucker in 1917 from Smithfield. It has not been revised since its original description and remains known only from the female specimen.
