= Stasimopus kentanicus =

Scientific classification
- Kingdom: Animalia
- Phylum: Arthropoda
- Subphylum: Chelicerata
- Class: Arachnida
- Order: Araneae
- Infraorder: Mygalomorphae
- Family: Stasimopidae
- Genus: Stasimopus
- Species: S. kentanicus

Binomial name
- Stasimopus kentanicus Purcell, 1903

Species of spider

Stasimopus kentanicus is a species of spider in the family Stasimopidae. It is endemic to South Africa.

== Distribution ==
Stasimopus kentanicus is found in the Eastern Cape province of South Africa. It is known only from the type locality at Kentani at an altitude of 485 m above sea level.

== Habitat and ecology ==
The species is a ground dweller that lives in silk-lined burrows closed with a cork-lid trapdoor. The lid is thick with the underside unevenly convex and strongly rounded at edges. The circle of pits is almost entirely obliterated. It has been sampled from the Thicket biome.

== Conservation ==
Stasimopus kentanicus is listed as Data Deficient by the South African National Biodiversity Institute. The species is known only from the type locality, and its status remains obscure. The type locality has a habitat loss threat due to infrastructure development, and habitat degradation due to cattle farming. More sampling is needed to determine the species' range.

== Taxonomy ==
The species was originally described by Purcell in 1903 from Kentani. The genus has not yet been revised.
