= Stasimopus brevipalpis =

Scientific classification
- Kingdom: Animalia
- Phylum: Arthropoda
- Subphylum: Chelicerata
- Class: Arachnida
- Order: Araneae
- Infraorder: Mygalomorphae
- Family: Stasimopidae
- Genus: Stasimopus
- Species: S. brevipalpis

Binomial name
- Stasimopus brevipalpis Purcell, 1903

Species of spider

Stasimopus brevipalpis is a species of spider in the family Stasimopidae. It is endemic to South Africa.

== Distribution ==
Stasimopus brevipalpis is found in the Western Cape province of South Africa. It occurs at Ashton on Farm Bonnie Vale, Robertson, and Bontebok National Park, at altitudes ranging from 108 to 227 m above sea level.

== Habitat and ecology ==
The species is a ground dweller that lives in silk-lined burrows closed with a trapdoor lid. The trapdoor has a width of 22 mm with a hinge width of 15 mm and an average thickness of 4 mm. The width of the burrow lower down is 16.8 mm. Burrows have been found in the Fynbos biome.

== Conservation ==
Stasimopus brevipalpis is listed as Data Deficient by the South African National Biodiversity Institute. The species is known from three localities collected prior to 1903. Identification of the species remains problematic, and more sampling is needed to determine the species' present range. The species is threatened by habitat loss for crop farming at Bonnievale and habitat degradation due to soil erosion along the banks of the Breede River. It is protected in Bontebok National Park.

== Taxonomy ==
The species was originally described by Purcell in 1903 from Ashton. The genus has not yet been revised.
