= Stasimopus poweri =

Scientific classification
- Kingdom: Animalia
- Phylum: Arthropoda
- Subphylum: Chelicerata
- Class: Arachnida
- Order: Araneae
- Infraorder: Mygalomorphae
- Family: Stasimopidae
- Genus: Stasimopus
- Species: S. poweri

Binomial name
- Stasimopus poweri Hewitt, 1915

Species of spider

Stasimopus poweri is a species of spider in the family Stasimopidae. It is endemic to South Africa.

== Distribution ==
Stasimopus poweri is endemic to the Northern Cape province of South Africa. It is known only from the type locality at Modder River near Kimberley at an altitude of 1116 m above sea level.

== Habitat and ecology ==
The species inhabits the Savanna biome. Stasimopus poweri is a ground dweller that constructs silk-lined burrows closed with a cork-lid trapdoor.

== Conservation ==
Stasimopus poweri is listed as Data Deficient for taxonomic reasons. The species has a very restricted distribution range. The species is potentially threatened by habitat loss to infrastructure development and farming activity in Modder River. The status of the species remains obscure, and more sampling is needed to collect males and determine the species' full range.

== Taxonomy ==
The species was originally described by Hewitt in 1915 from Modder River near Kimberley. It has not been revised since its original description and remains known only from female specimens.
