= Karoo National Park =

Wildlife reserve in the Western Cape, South Africa

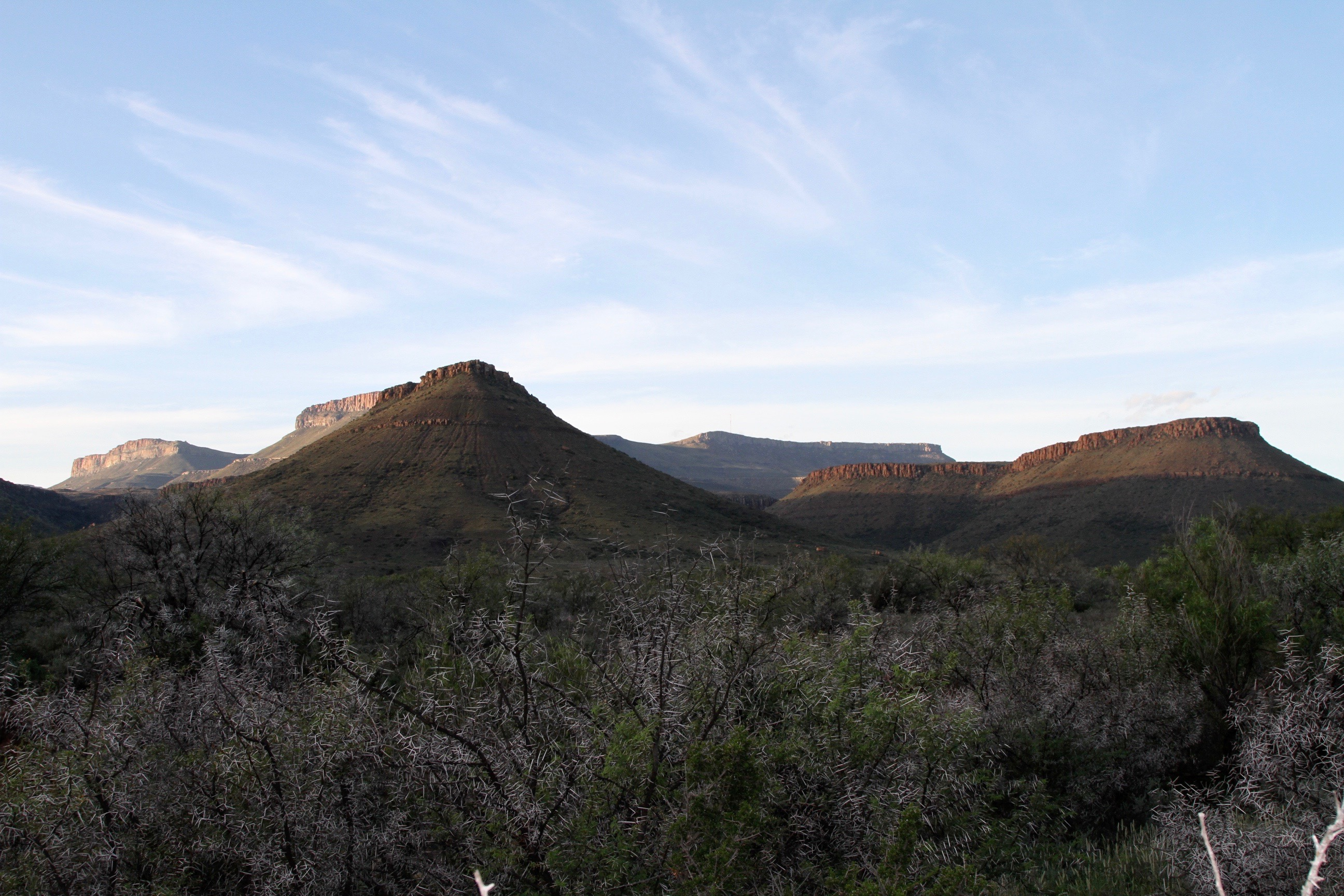
- Karoo landscape
- Location of the park
- Location: Western Cape, South Africa
- Nearest city: Beaufort West
- Coordinates: 32°15′43.9″S 22°18′32.8″E
- Area: 767.9 km^{2} (296.5 sq mi)
- Established: 1979
- Governing body: South African National Parks
- Website: www.sanparks.org/parks/karoo/
- Karoo National Park (South Africa) Karoo National Park (Western Cape)

The Karoo National Park is a wildlife reserve in the Great Karoo area of the Western Cape, South Africa near Beaufort West. This semi-desert area covers an area of 750 square kilometres (290 sq mi). The Nuweveld portion of the Great Escarpment runs through the Park. It is therefore partly in the Lower Karoo, at about 850 m above sea level, and partly in the Upper Karoo at over 1300 m altitude.

== Facilities ==
The Park has a camp site for caravans and tents, chalets, an à la carte restaurant, a shop for basic necessities and curios, and picnic sites. The Park can be viewed by visitors on their own or with a guide.

There are two main game viewing drives that do not require a four-wheel drive vehicle: the one to the east remains on the “Lammertjiesleegte” plains of the Lower Karoo; the other is the 49 km long circular route to the west which ascends the Klipspringer Pass on to the plateau (Upper Karoo), and eventually returns to the plains at the "Doornhoek" picnic site at the western extremity of the loop. From there it follows a south-easterly course across the plains to the beginning of the Klipspringer Pass, near the camp site and chalets. At the top of the Klipspringer Pass the Rooivalle View Point presents a clear view of the Lower Karoo. The middle portion of the park, to the west of the Klipspringer Pass circular route, is easily accessible in 4x4 vehicles, and covers an extensive area, with game viewing opportunities.

== Wildlife ==
The Karoo National Park is a sanctuary for herds of springbok, gemsbok (or Oryx), black wildebeest, Cape mountain zebra, red hartebeest, black rhinoceros, eland, kudu, klipspringer, bat-eared foxes, black-backed jackal, ostriches, and, since fairly recently, lions. It also has the greatest number of tortoise species of any park in the world - five in total. The endangered riverine rabbit has been successfully resettled here. A large number of Verreaux's eagles have nests on the cliffs of the escarpment. Martial eagles, booted eagles and the shy Cape eagle-owl are other raptors that can be seen in the Park. A wide variety of smaller birds occur in abundance, making the Park a birder’s paradise. The park has also been populated with Rau Quagga which are Plains or Burchell's zebras that have been back-bred to resemble the quaggas that roamed the karoo in great profusion until the middle of the 1800s, when they were hunted to extinction. The last quagga died in Amsterdam Zoo on 12 August 1883. In September 2020, seven lions who'd escaped from the Karoo National Park, were killed by rangers.

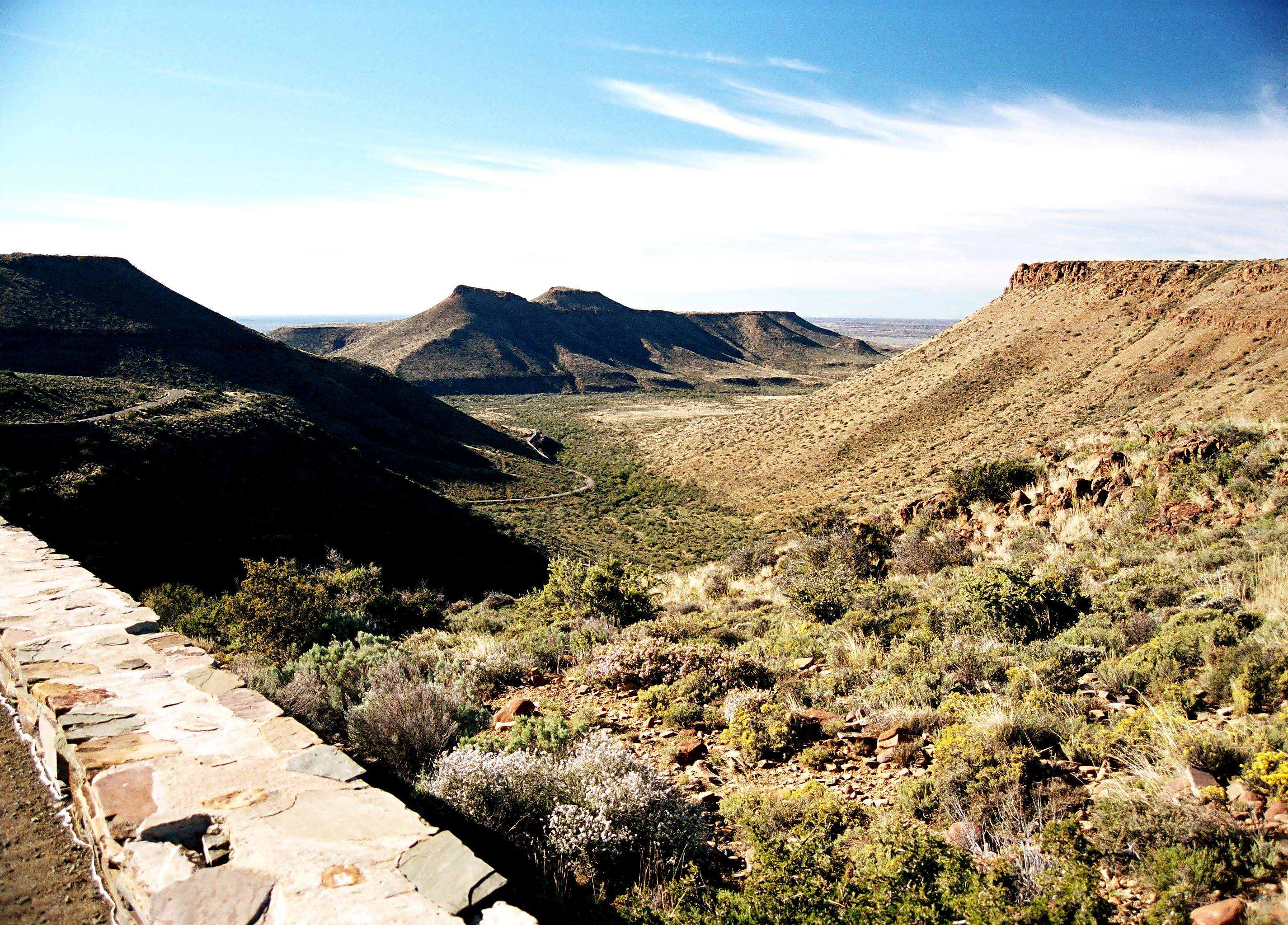
The Karoo National Park seen from the Klipspringer Pass as it winds its way up the Nuweberg Escarpment to the Rooivalle view site. The Escarpment here, as in much of its extent in the southern Karoo, is topped by a dolerite sill, giving it its sharp, level, upper edge.

== Geology ==
The Park both below and above the Great Escarpment is situated on the Beaufort group of rocks, which form part of the Karoo geological system of deposits. The Beaufort sediments were laid down on a vast alluvial plain covering much of what was to become Southern Africa, when it was still part of Gondwana, beginning about 280 million years ago, and ending about 240 million years ago. These 6 km thick sediments were deposited by rivers similar in size and number to the Ganges, Brahmaputra, and Indus rivers which drain the Himalaya mountains on the Indian subcontinent today. In Gondwana, when the Beaufort sediments were being laid down, the Himalaya-sized mountains were to the south of the present South African coastline, on what is geologically known as the “Falklands Plateau”, now separated from South Africa by continental drift, and lying as severely eroded islands in the south-western Atlantic Ocean. A large variety of amphibians and reptiles lived on the lush vegetation of these well-watered plains, the most interesting of which were the mammal-like reptiles, which have made the Karoo paleontologically famous. Their fossils have been found all over the Karoo. Some of these fossils are on display in the Park, though none of them have been found there.

About 60 million years after the Beaufort sediments had been laid down and topped with a thick layer of desert sands, there was an outpouring of lava on to Southern Africa on a titanic scale. The entire area was covered within a very short space of time with a 1.5 km thick layer of lava, the remnants of which form the Drakensberg. In addition to flooding the African surface with lava, lava was also forced under great pressure between the sedimentary layers of the Beaufort rocks. These subterranean horizontal layers of lava solidified into what are known as dolerite sills, which can vary in thickness from a few centimetres to several meters. Subsequent erosion of the Southern African interior re-exposed the Beaufort rocks over most of the Great Karoo. But the dolerite sills were more resistant to erosion than the Beaufort sediments, which resulted in the creation of flat topped hills all over the Karoo (the flat tops being formed by dolerite sills). The flat top edge of the Great Escarpment in the Karoo is also formed, in many places including the Karoo National Park, by a thick dolerite sill.

== Vegetation ==
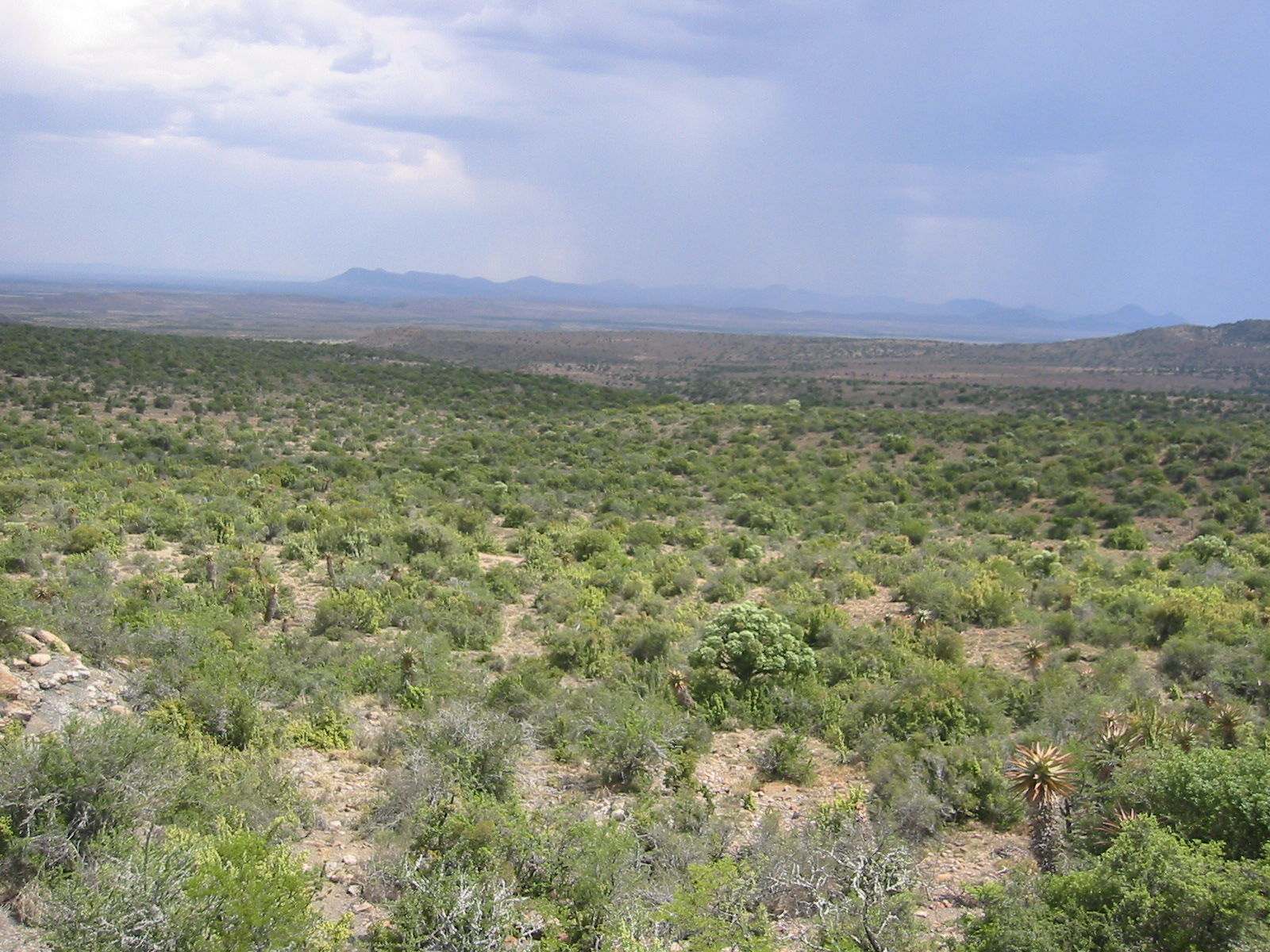

The vegetation consists primarily of dwarf (less than 1 m high) xerophytic shrubs with some grasses. The shrubs and grasses are deciduous, mainly in response to the irregular rainfall

== Climate ==
The Karoo National Park Annual rainfall ranges between 100 and 500mm, averaging at about 200mm. Summer rainfall comes mostly in the form of thunderstorms or cold fronts from the Cape. The winters are frosty and chilly, when temperatures drop to below 0 degrees Celsius, with snow sometimes visible on the peaks of the Nuweveld Mountains. Summers are hot, with temperatures rising up to 40 degrees Celsius.

== Gallery ==
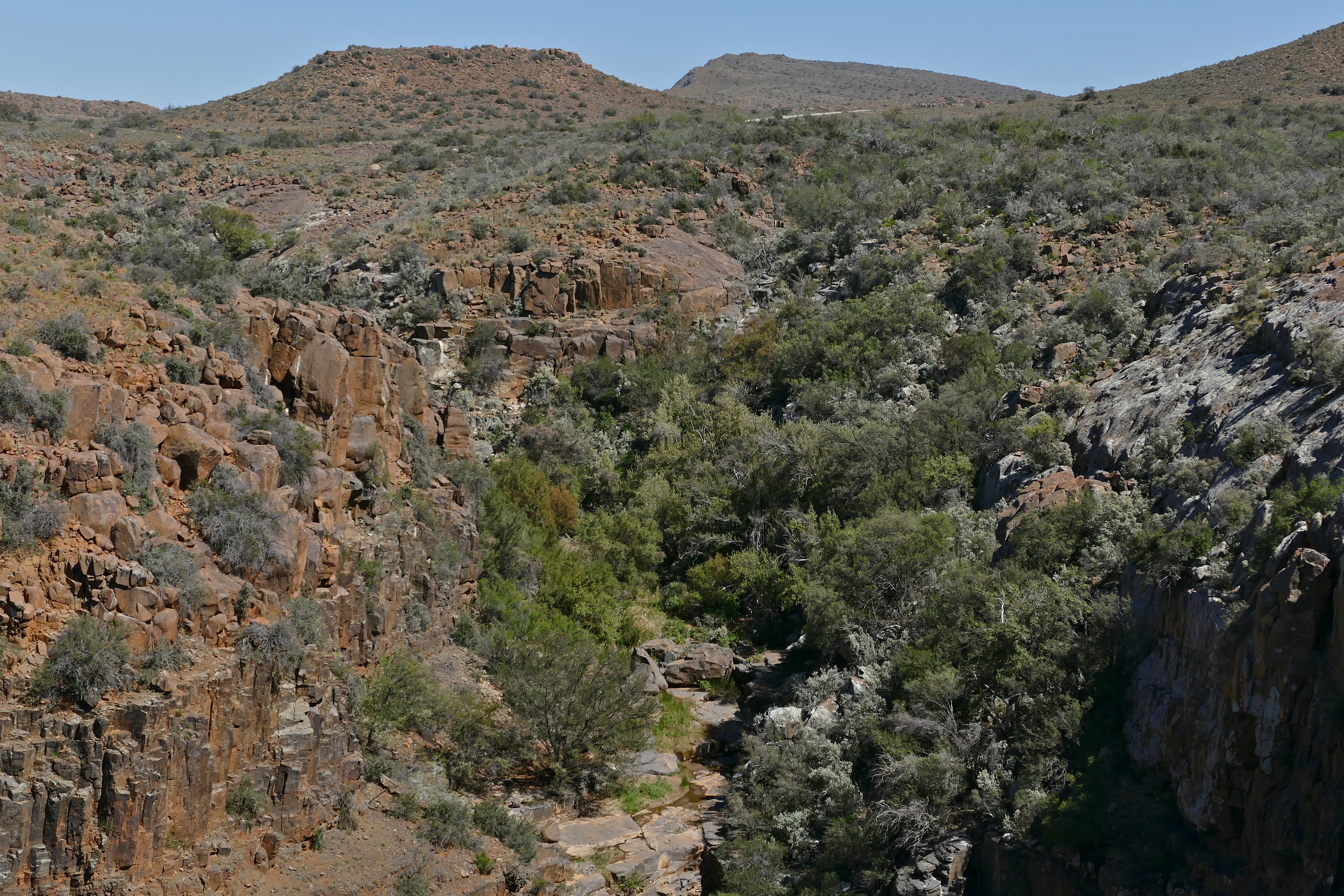
Rooiwalle Canyon

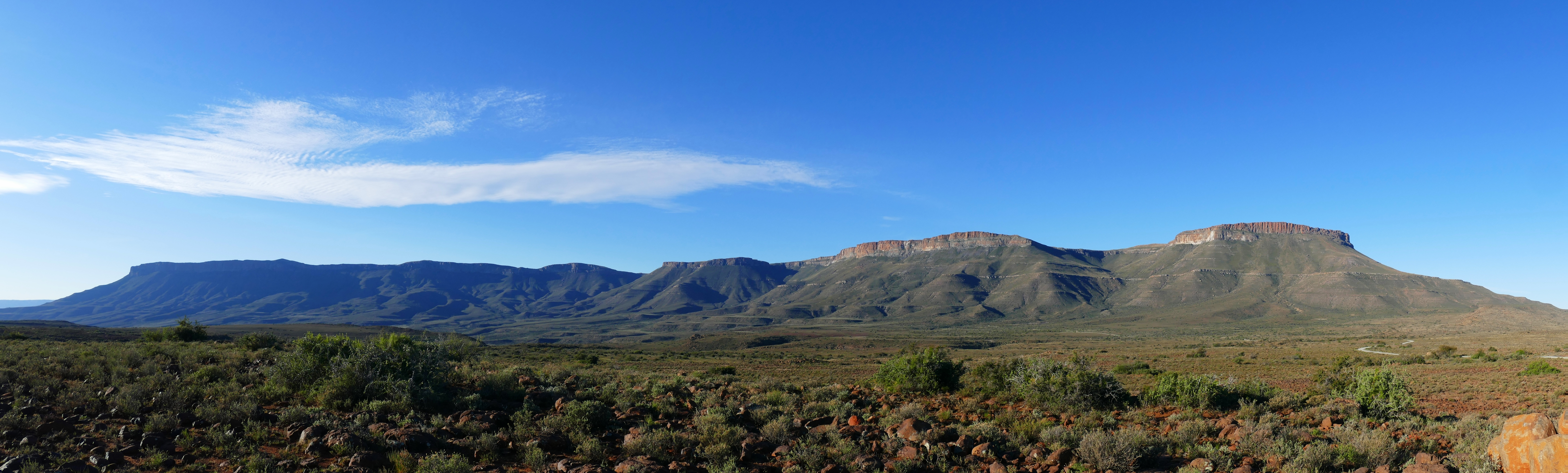
Nuweveld Mountains

== See also ==
- List of conservation areas of South Africa
