= Nama Karoo =

Xeric shrubland ecoregion on the central plateau of South Africa and Namibia

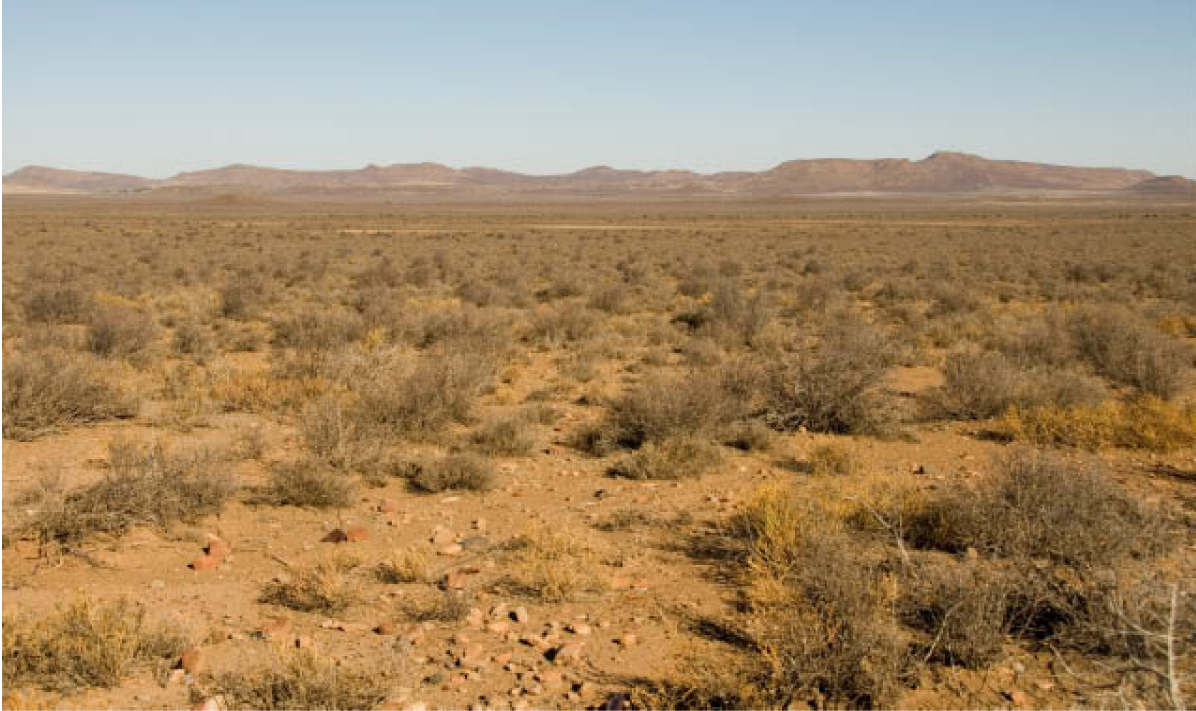

- A map of South Africa showing the Nama Karoo ecoregion as defined by WWF

Ecology
- Realm: Afrotropic
- Biome: Deserts and xeric shrublands

Geography
- Area: 135,600 km^{2} (52,400 sq mi)
- Countries: South Africa; Namibia
- Coordinates: 30°S 21°E

Nama Karoo is a xeric shrubland ecoregion located on the central plateau of South Africa and Namibia. It occupies most of the interior of the western half of South Africa and extends into the southern interior of Namibia.

== Climate ==
The climate of the Nama Karoo tends to be volatile, unpredictable and rather harsh, with only the most specially-adapted organisms calling the region home. The annual ‘dry’ season—a time of blistering hot weather and drought—is long, often taking place over autumn and winter, and into early spring. Heavy rainfall primarily occurs in the spring and summer ‘wet’ season. This time of plenty can also vary, with total measured rainfall fluctuating between 100 and 520 millimetres (3.94 and 20.47 in) per year. Rainfall is also known to be highly seasonal, peaking between December and March. Precipitation tends to decrease from the east to west, and from north to south. As the climate changes, inter-annual rainfall trends become varied, and unpredictability comes to be expected, especially with increasingly prolonged periods of aridity. Temperature variations as large as 25 °C or 45 °F between day and night are common. Mean maximum temperatures in the mid-summer (January) exceeds 30 °C (86 °F), while mean minimum mid-winter (July) temperatures are below freezing.

== See also ==
- Geography of South Africa
