= John Hewitt (herpetologist) =

South African zoologist and archaeologist

- Born: 23 December 1880; Dronfield, Derbyshire, England
- Died: 4 August 1961 (aged 80); Grahamstown, South Africa
- Citizenship: British
- Education: Jesus College, Cambridge
- Known for: herpetological research
- Spouse: Florence E. Palmer
- Scientific career
- Fields: zoologist and archaeologist
- Workplaces: Albany Museum

John Hewitt (23 December 1880 – 4 August 1961) was a South African zoologist and archaeologist of British origin. He was born in Dronfield, Derbyshire, England, and died in Grahamstown, South Africa. He was the author of several herpetological papers which described new species. He also described new species of spiders and other arachnids.

== Biography ==
He graduated with a first-class in natural sciences from Jesus College, Cambridge in 1903. From 1905 to 1908 he was Curator of the Sarawak Museum in Kuching, Sarawak.

In 1909 he went to South Africa to work as an assistant curator at the Transvaal Museum in Pretoria. In 1910 he was appointed Director of the Albany Museum in Grahamstown, eventually retiring in 1958. His daughter, Florence Ellen Hewitt (1910–1979), was a teacher and phycologist. He was a founder member of the South African Museums Association and following his retirement as director the new wing of the Albany Museum in 1958 was named after him. He was succeeded as archaeologist at the Albany Museum by Hilary Deacon.

== Archaeological work ==
Hewitt began investigating into Stone age sites in the Grahamstown area of the Eastern Cape; there in collaboration with C. W. Wilmot he excavated a cave on the farm Wilton, and described the culture that has ever since been known as Wilton culture.

With the Reverend A. P. Stapleton he gave the first account of the Howiesons Poort culture.

== Awards ==
- Honorary D.Sc. of the University of South Africa (1935)
- South Africa Medal of the South African Association for the Advancement of Science (1936).
- Fellow of the Royal Society of South Africa.

=== Eponym ===
Hewitt is honored in the specific name of a species of Bornean beetle, Cicindela hewittii and of South African lizard, Goggia hewitti.

== Bibliography ==
- Adler, Kraig (editor) (1989). Contributions to the History of Herpetology. St. Louis, Missouri: Society for the Study of Amphibians and Reptiles. p. 80.
