= Idiosoma winsori =

Scientific classification
- Kingdom: Animalia
- Phylum: Arthropoda
- Subphylum: Chelicerata
- Class: Arachnida
- Order: Araneae
- Infraorder: Mygalomorphae
- Family: Idiopidae
- Genus: Idiosoma
- Species: I. winsori

Binomial name
- Idiosoma winsori (Faulder, 1985)

Synonyms
- Aganippe winsori Faulder, 1985

Species of spider

Idiosoma winsori is a species of mygalomorph spider in the Idiopidae family. It is endemic to Australia. It was described in 1985 by Australian arachnologist Richard Faulder.

== Distribution and habitat ==
The species occurs in Victoria. The type locality is the Grampians Range.
