= Idiosoma galeosomoides =

Scientific classification
- Kingdom: Animalia
- Phylum: Arthropoda
- Subphylum: Chelicerata
- Class: Arachnida
- Order: Araneae
- Infraorder: Mygalomorphae
- Family: Idiopidae
- Genus: Idiosoma
- Species: I. galeosomoides

Binomial name
- Idiosoma galeosomoides Rix, Main, Raven & Harvey, 2017

Species of spider

Idiosoma galeosomoides is a species of mygalomorph spider in the Idiopidae family. It is endemic to Australia. It was described in 2017 by Australian arachnologists Michael Rix, Barbara York Main, Robert Raven and Mark Harvey.

== Distribution and habitat ==
The species occurs in Western Australia in the Coolgardie bioregion. The type locality is Deception Hill, 78 km south-west of Lake Barlee, 113 km north-north-west of Koolyanobbing.
