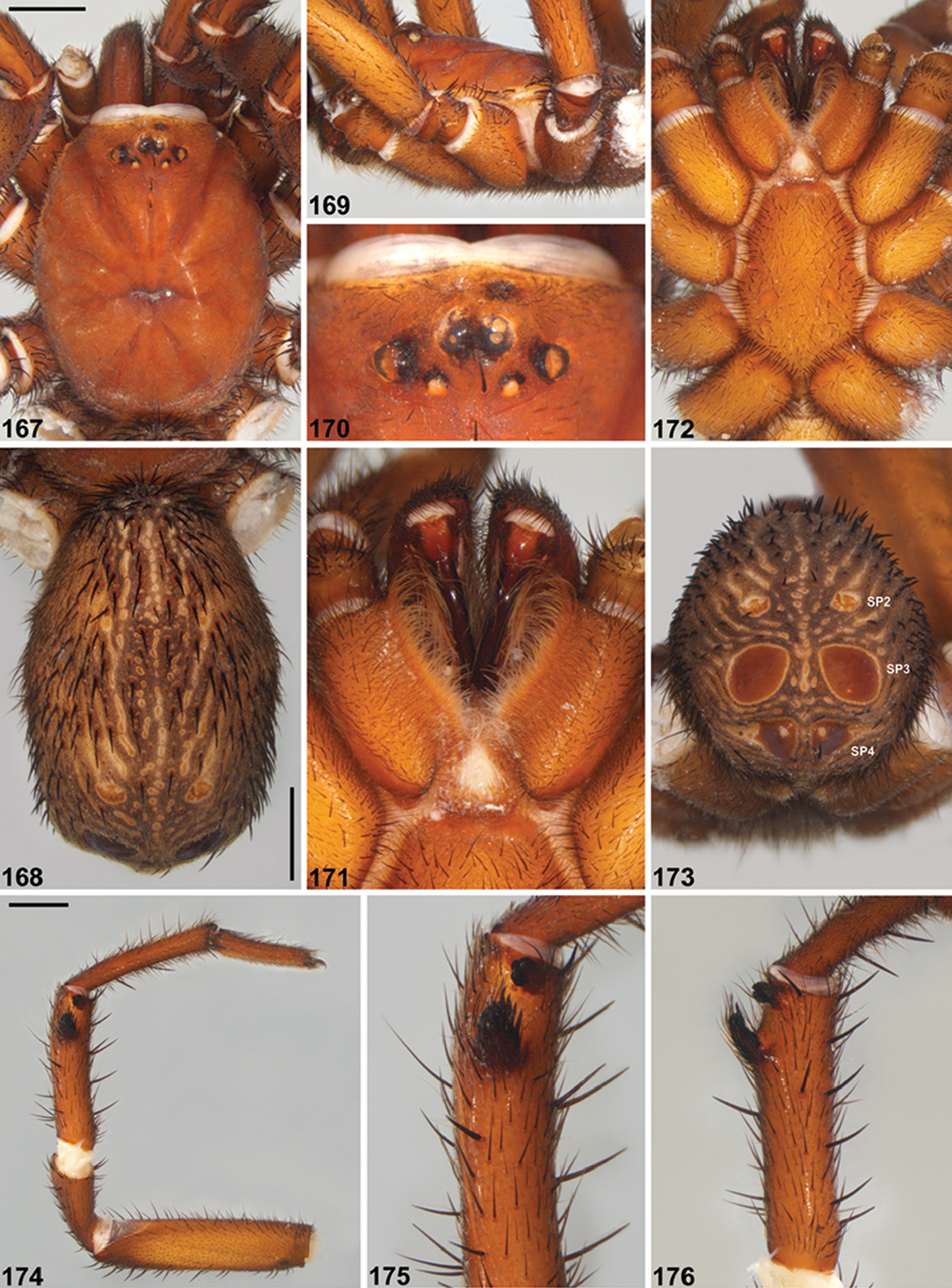
- Male holotype

Scientific classification
- Kingdom: Animalia
- Phylum: Arthropoda
- Subphylum: Chelicerata
- Class: Arachnida
- Order: Araneae
- Infraorder: Mygalomorphae
- Family: Idiopidae
- Genus: Idiosoma
- Species: I. gardneri

Binomial name
- Idiosoma gardneri Rix & Harvey, 2018

= Idiosoma gardneri =

Species of spider

Idiosoma gardneri is a species of mygalomorph spider in the Idiopidae family. It is endemic to Australia. It was described in 2018 by Australian arachnologists Michael Rix and Mark Harvey. The specific epithet gardneri honours botanist Charles Gardner (1896–1970), former curator of the Western Australian Herbarium, who was instrumental in protecting what was to become the Lesueur National Park for posterity.

== Distribution and habitat ==
The species occurs in south-west Western Australia in the southern Geraldton Sandplains bioregion. The type locality is heathland habitat on Mount Lesueur.
