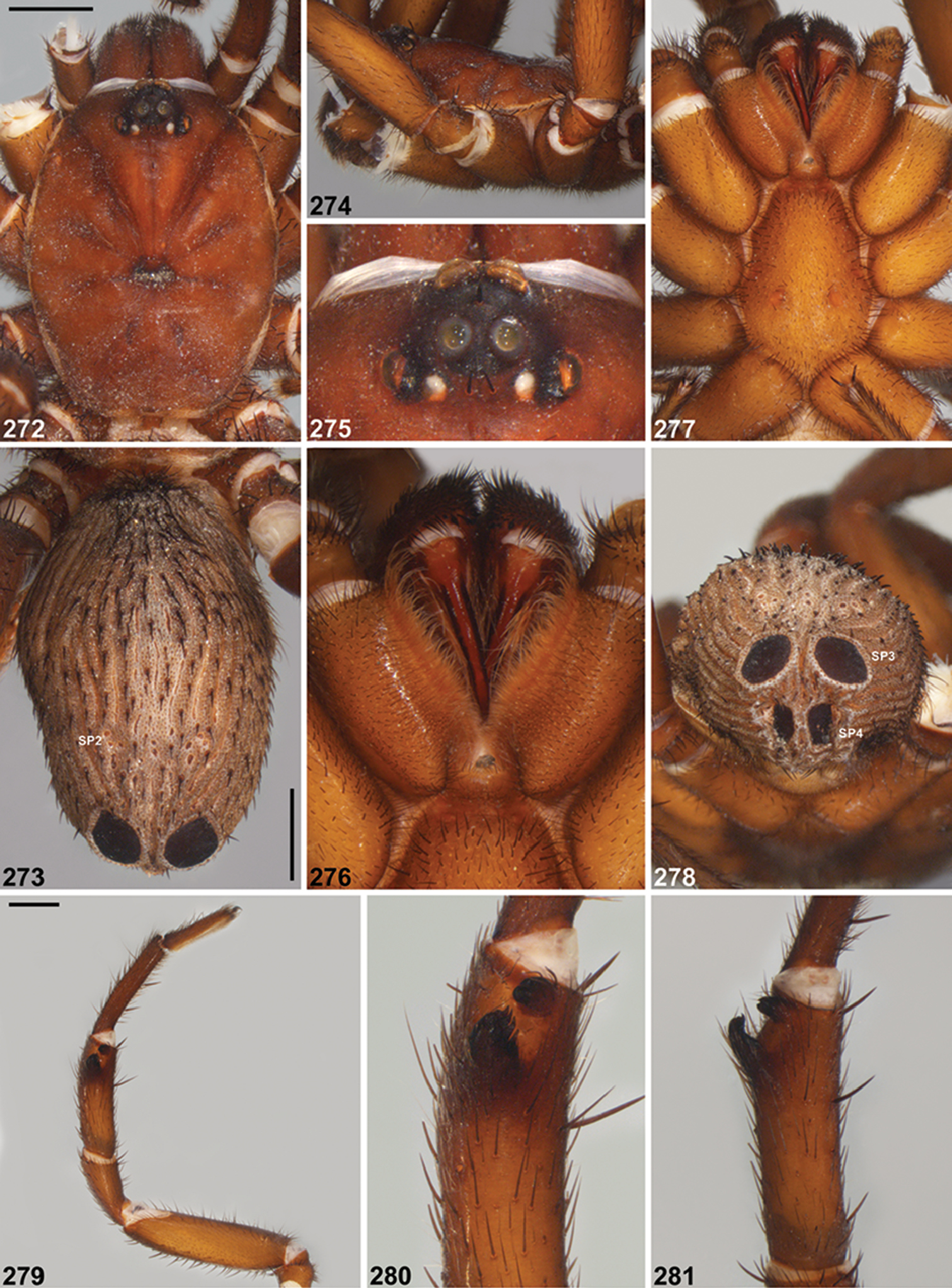
- Male holotype

Scientific classification
- Kingdom: Animalia
- Phylum: Arthropoda
- Subphylum: Chelicerata
- Class: Arachnida
- Order: Araneae
- Infraorder: Mygalomorphae
- Family: Idiopidae
- Genus: Idiosoma
- Species: I. kwongan

Binomial name
- Idiosoma kwongan Rix & Harvey, 2018

= Idiosoma kwongan =

Species of spider

Idiosoma kwongan is a species of mygalomorph spider in the Idiopidae family. It is endemic to Australia. It was described in 2018 by Australian arachnologists Michael Rix and Mark Harvey. The specific epithet kwongan refers to the spiders’ preferred habitat.

== Distribution and habitat ==
The species occurs in south-west Western Australia, in the southern Geraldton Sandplains bioregion, in kwongan Banksia heathlands. The type locality is laterite heath 10 km east of Green Head.
