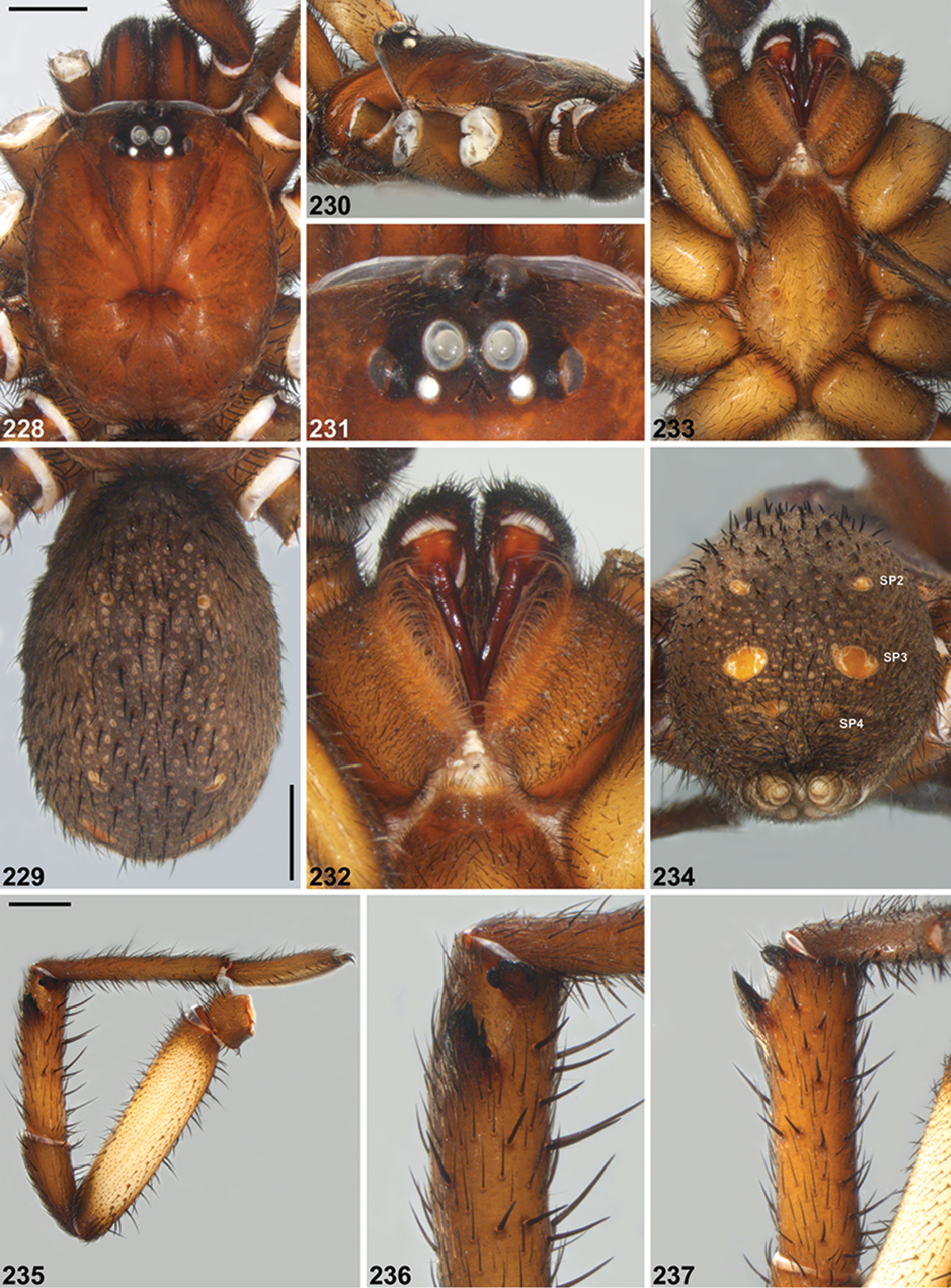
- Male holotype

Scientific classification
- Kingdom: Animalia
- Phylum: Arthropoda
- Subphylum: Chelicerata
- Class: Arachnida
- Order: Araneae
- Infraorder: Mygalomorphae
- Family: Idiopidae
- Genus: Idiosoma
- Species: I. jarrah

Binomial name
- Idiosoma jarrah Rix & Harvey, 2018

= Idiosoma jarrah =

Species of spider

Idiosoma jarrah is a species of mygalomorph spider in the Idiopidae family. It is endemic to Australia. It was described in 2018 by Australian arachnologists Michael Rix and Mark Harvey. The specific epithet jarrah refers to the bioregion in which the spiders are found.

== Distribution and habitat ==
The species occurs in south-west Western Australia, in the Jarrah Forest bioregion, in mixed jarrah and marri forest on and east of the Darling Scarp, from Bullsbrook southwards to Boddington and Arthur River. The type locality is Lesmurdie, a suburb of Perth.

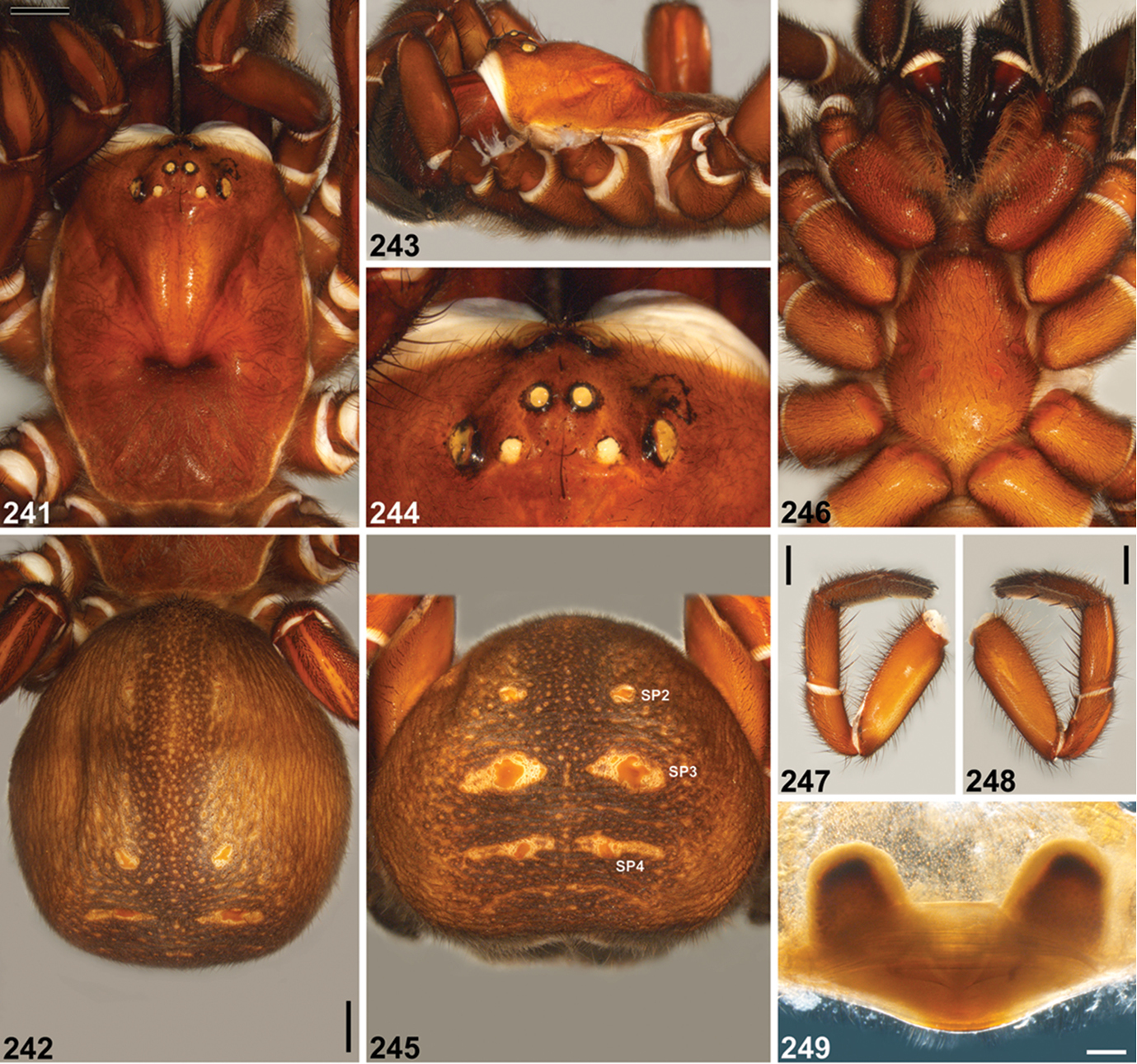
Female paratype
