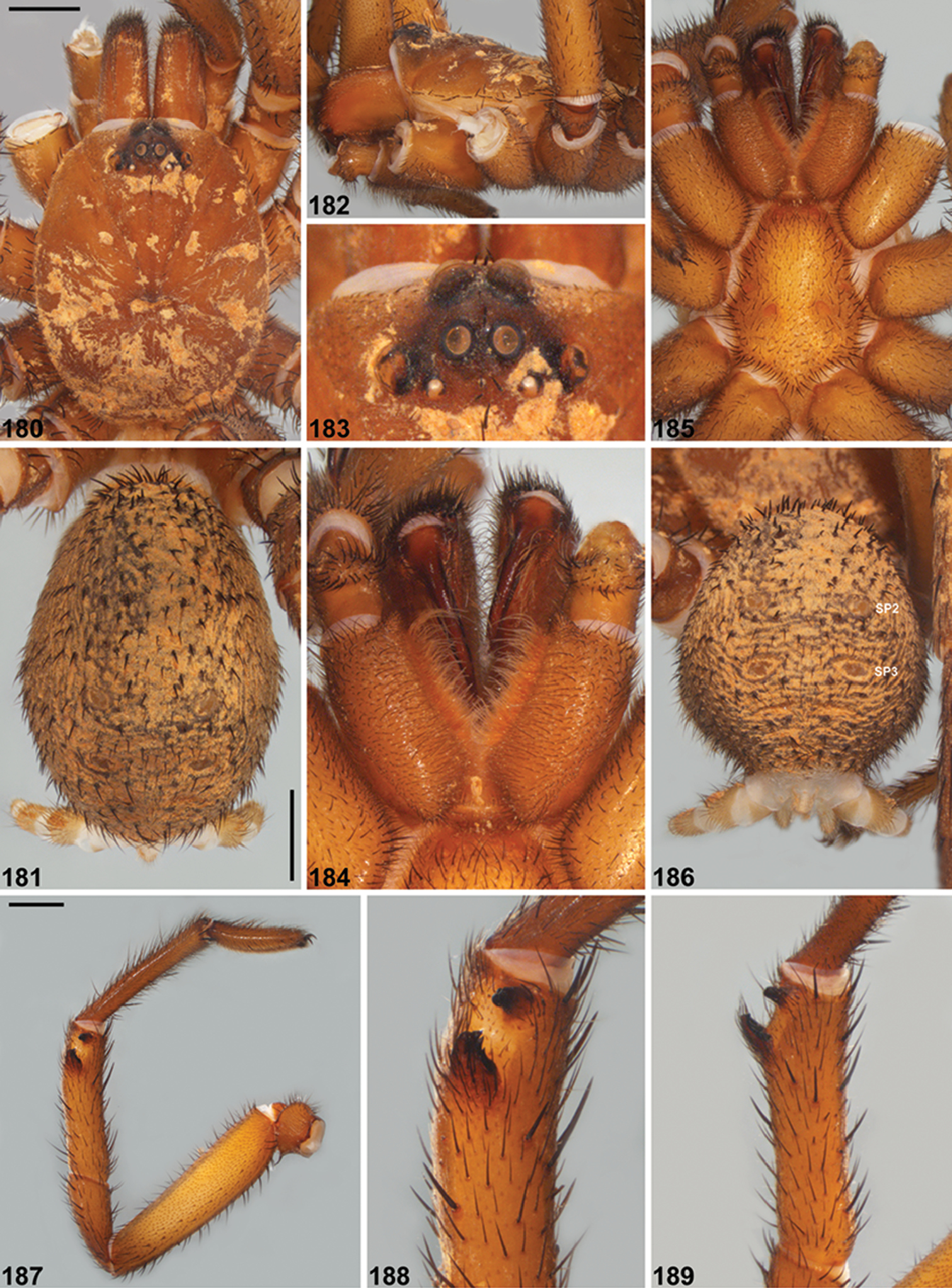
- Male holotype

Scientific classification
- Kingdom: Animalia
- Phylum: Arthropoda
- Subphylum: Chelicerata
- Class: Arachnida
- Order: Araneae
- Infraorder: Mygalomorphae
- Family: Idiopidae
- Genus: Idiosoma
- Species: I. gutharuka

Binomial name
- Idiosoma gutharuka Rix & Harvey, 2018

= Idiosoma gutharuka =

Species of spider

Idiosoma gutharuka is a species of mygalomorph spider in the Idiopidae family, endemic to Australia and described in 2018 by Australian arachnologists Michael Rix and Mark Harvey. The specific epithet gutharuka comes from a contraction of "Gutha" and "Pintharuka", in reference to the type locality.

== Distribution and habitat ==
The species occurs in Western Australia in the northern Avon Wheatbelt bioregion. The type locality is Gutha, near Pintharuka.
