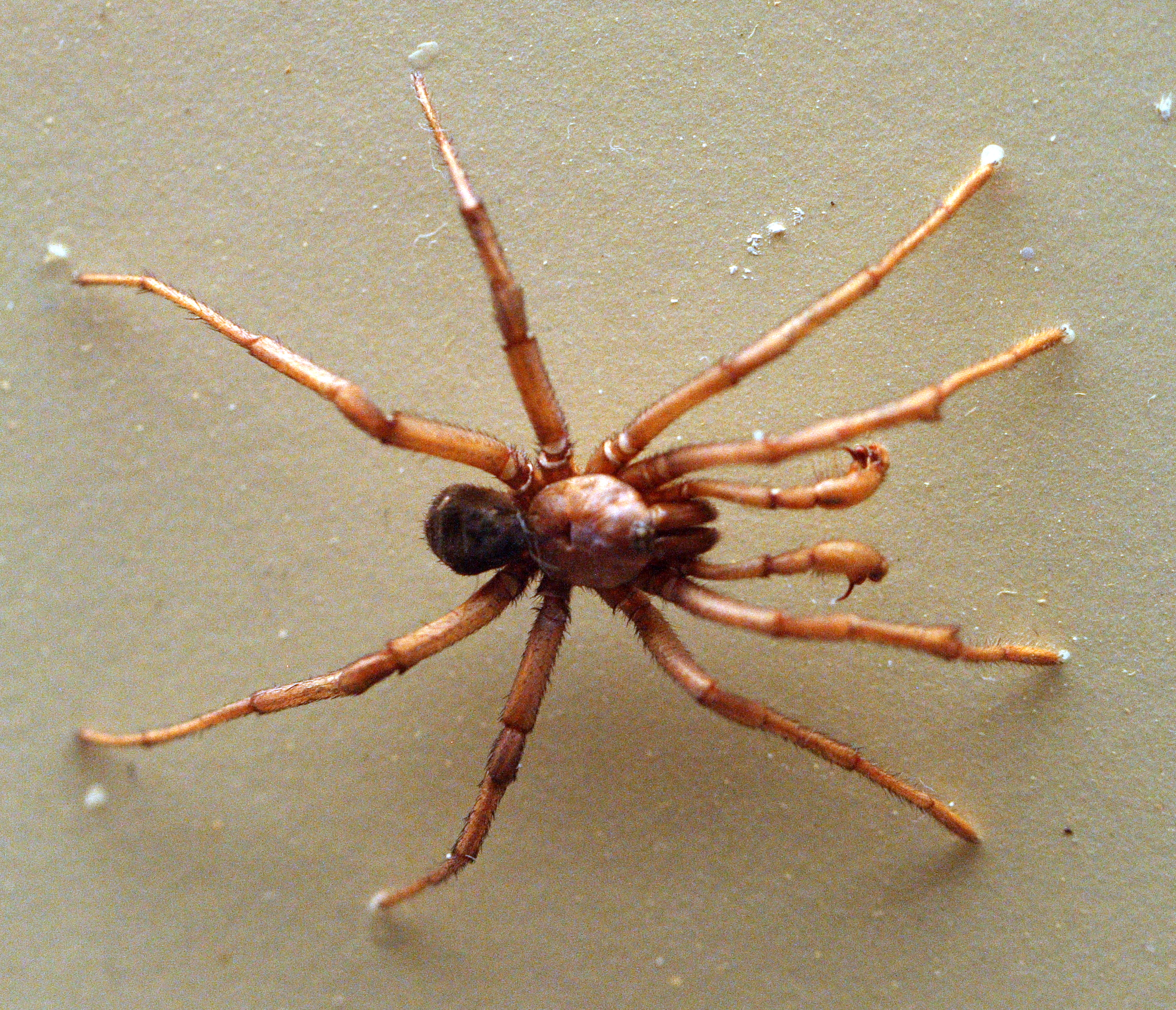
- Idiosoma planites

Scientific classification
- Kingdom: Animalia
- Phylum: Arthropoda
- Subphylum: Chelicerata
- Class: Arachnida
- Order: Araneae
- Infraorder: Mygalomorphae
- Family: Idiopidae
- Genus: Idiosoma; Ausserer, 1871

Type species
- I. sigillatum (O. Pickard-Cambridge, 1870)

Species
- 29, see text

Synonyms
- Aganippe O. Pickard-Cambridge, 1877; Anidiops Pocock, 1897

= Idiosoma =

Genus of spiders

Idiosoma is a genus of Australian armoured trapdoor spiders that was first described by Anton Ausserer in 1871. Originally placed with the Ctenizidae, it was moved to the armoured trapdoor spiders in 1985. The name is derived from the Greek ἴδιος (idios), meaning "individual, unique", and σῶμα (soma), meaning "body", referring to the distinctive structure of the abdomen.

== Description ==
The skin of their abdomen is hardened, with a flattened end and deep grooves running along the sides. The thickened skin helps to reduce water loss in its dry habitat. It also serves as a kind of plug to shield itself from predators. This phenomenon is called phragmosis and occurs in perfection in the spider genus Cyclocosmia (Ctenizidae). However, some parasitic wasps have evolved paper-thin abdomens and long, slender ovipositors and lay their eggs on the softer skin at the front of the spider's abdomen.

Females of the black rugose trapdoor spider (Idiosoma nigrum) can grow up to 30 millimetres (1.2 in) long. Males can grow up to 18 millimetres (0.71 in) in body length.

== Behaviour ==
The spider digs burrows up to 32 centimetres (13 in) deep, where the temperature is relatively constant through the seasons. When prey triggers any of the trip-lines radiating from the burrow's entrance, the spider runs out of the burrow to capture ants, beetles, cockroaches, millipedes or moths. This is unlike many trapdoor spiders that very rarely leave their burrow. Males actively look for females, and mating takes place in the female's burrow. She lays her eggs during late spring and early summer. The spiderlings hatch in mid-summer, and stay inside the burrow until early winter, when the weather becomes more humid.

== Species ==
As of May 2019 the genus contained twenty-nine species from the states of New South Wales (NSW), South Australia (SA), Victoria (VIC) or Western Australia (WA):

- Idiosoma arenaceum Rix & Harvey, 2018 – WA
- Idiosoma berlandi (Rainbow, 1914) – NSW
- Idiosoma castellum (Main, 1986) – WA
- Idiosoma clypeatum Rix & Harvey, 2018 – WA
- Idiosoma corrugatum Rix & Harvey, 2018 – SA
- Idiosoma cupulifex (Main, 1957) – WA
- Idiosoma dandaragan Rix & Harvey, 2018 – WA
- Idiosoma formosum Rix & Harvey, 2018 – WA
- Idiosoma galeosomoides Rix, Main, Raven & Harvey, 2017 – WA
- Idiosoma gardneri Rix & Harvey, 2018 – WA
- Idiosoma gutharuka Rix & Harvey, 2018 – WA
- Idiosoma incomptum Rix & Harvey, 2018 – WA
- Idiosoma intermedium Rix & Harvey, 2018 – WA
- Idiosoma jarrah Rix & Harvey, 2018 – WA
- Idiosoma kopejtkaorum Rix & Harvey, 2018 – WA
- Idiosoma kwongan Rix & Harvey, 2018 – WA
- Idiosoma manstridgei (Pocock, 1897) – WA
- Idiosoma mcclementsorum Rix & Harvey, 2018 – WA
- Idiosoma mcnamarai Rix & Harvey, 2018 – WA
- Idiosoma montanum (Faulder, 1985) – NSW
- Idiosoma nigrum Main, 1952 – WA
- Idiosoma occidentale (Hogg, 1903) – WA
- Idiosoma planites (Faulder, 1985) – NSW
- Idiosoma rhaphiduca (Rainbow & Pulleine, 1918) – WA
- Idiosoma schoknechtorum Rix & Harvey, 2018 – WA
- Idiosoma sigillatum (O. Pickard-Cambridge, 1870) (type) – WA
- Idiosoma smeatoni (Hogg, 1902) – SA
- Idiosoma subtriste (O. Pickard-Cambridge, 1877) – SA
- Idiosoma winsori (Faulder, 1985) – VIC
