= Idiosoma manstridgei =

Scientific classification
- Kingdom: Animalia
- Phylum: Arthropoda
- Subphylum: Chelicerata
- Class: Arachnida
- Order: Araneae
- Infraorder: Mygalomorphae
- Family: Idiopidae
- Genus: Idiosoma
- Species: I. manstridgei

Binomial name
- Idiosoma manstridgei (Pocock, 1897)

Synonyms
- Anidiops manstridgei Pocock, 1897

Species of spider

Idiosoma manstridgei is a species of spider in the family Idiopidae, found in Australia.

== Taxonomy ==
Idiosoma manstridgei was first described by Reginald Innes Pocock in 1897, as Anidiops manstridgei. It was transferred to Idiosoma in 2017. (The genus Anidiops is no longer recognized.)
