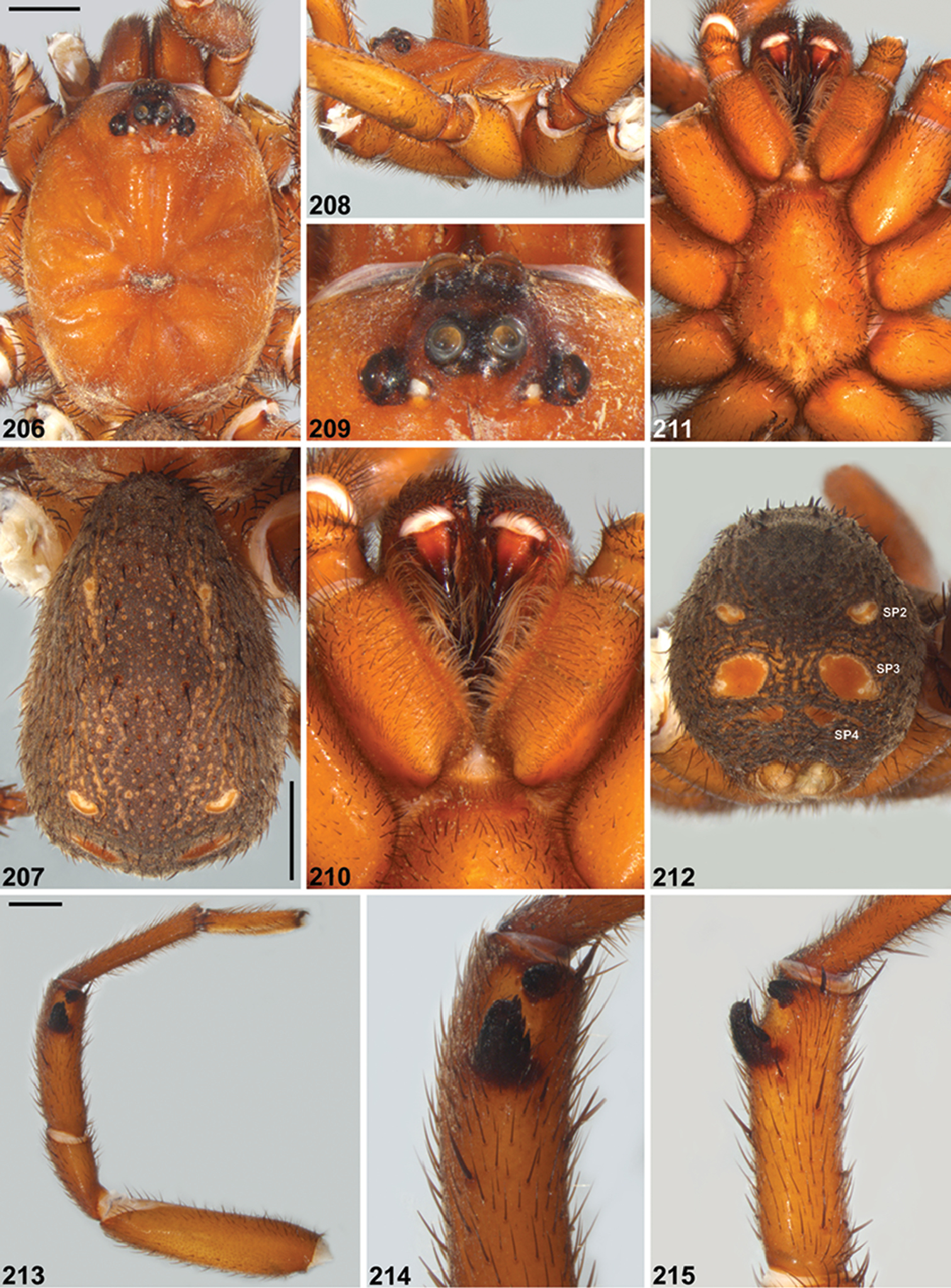
- Male holotype

Scientific classification
- Kingdom: Animalia
- Phylum: Arthropoda
- Subphylum: Chelicerata
- Class: Arachnida
- Order: Araneae
- Infraorder: Mygalomorphae
- Family: Idiopidae
- Genus: Idiosoma
- Species: I. intermedium

Binomial name
- Idiosoma intermedium Rix & Harvey, 2018

= Idiosoma intermedium =

Species of spider

Idiosoma intermedium is a species of mygalomorph spider in the Idiopidae family. It is endemic to Australia. It was described in 2018 by Australian arachnologists Michael Rix and Mark Harvey. The specific epithet intermedium comes from Latin intermedius (‘in between’ or ‘intermediate’), in reference to the intermediate size of the sigilla and relatively unsclerotised abdomen.

== Distribution and habitat ==
The species occurs in south-west Western Australia, in the eastern Avon Wheatbelt and north-western Coolgardie bioregions. The type locality is Bodallin.

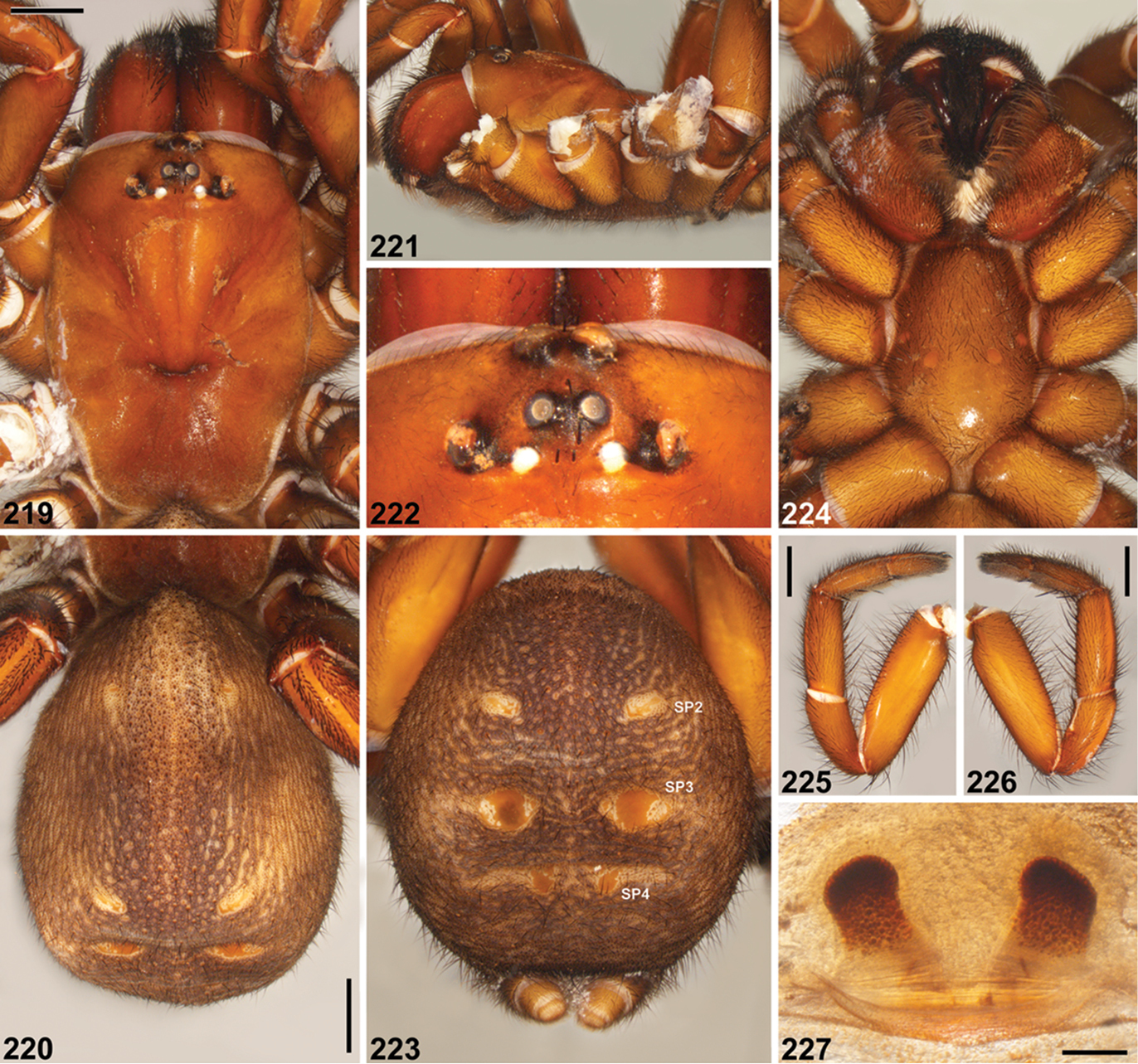
Female specimen
