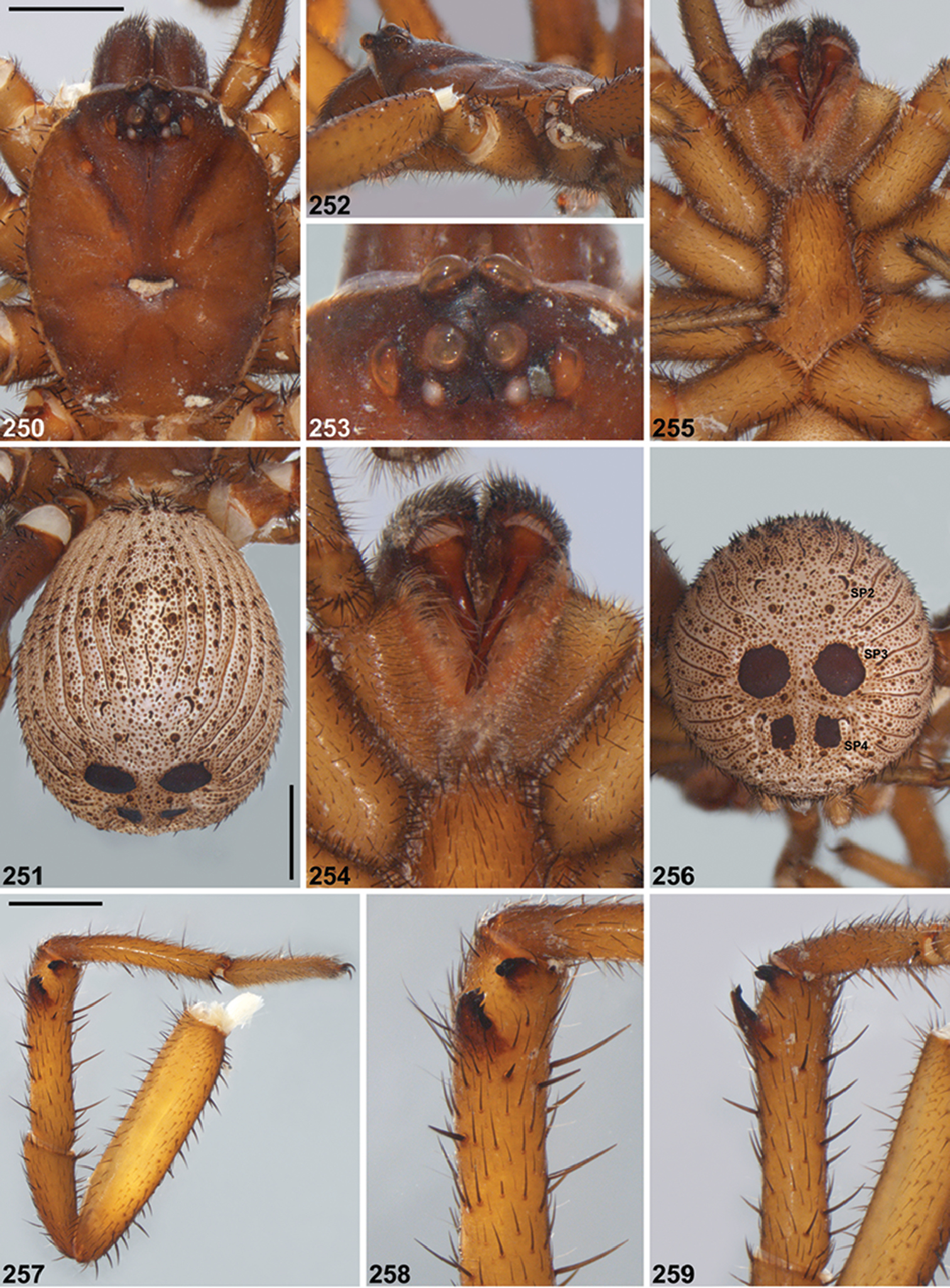
- Male holotype

Scientific classification
- Kingdom: Animalia
- Phylum: Arthropoda
- Subphylum: Chelicerata
- Class: Arachnida
- Order: Araneae
- Infraorder: Mygalomorphae
- Family: Idiopidae
- Genus: Idiosoma
- Species: I. kopejtkaorum

Binomial name
- Idiosoma kopejtkaorum Rix & Harvey, 2018

= Idiosoma kopejtkaorum =

Species of spider

Idiosoma kopejtkaorum is a species of mygalomorph spider in the Idiopidae family. It is endemic to Australia. It was described in 2018 by Australian arachnologists Michael Rix and Mark Harvey. The specific epithet kopejtkaorum honours Paul and Karen Kopejtka for their support for the Western Australian Museum Foundation.

== Distribution and habitat ==
The species occurs in south-west Western Australia, in the north-eastern Avon Wheatbelt bioregion. The type locality is Snake Gully Nature Reserve, Xantippe, some 220 km north-east of Perth.

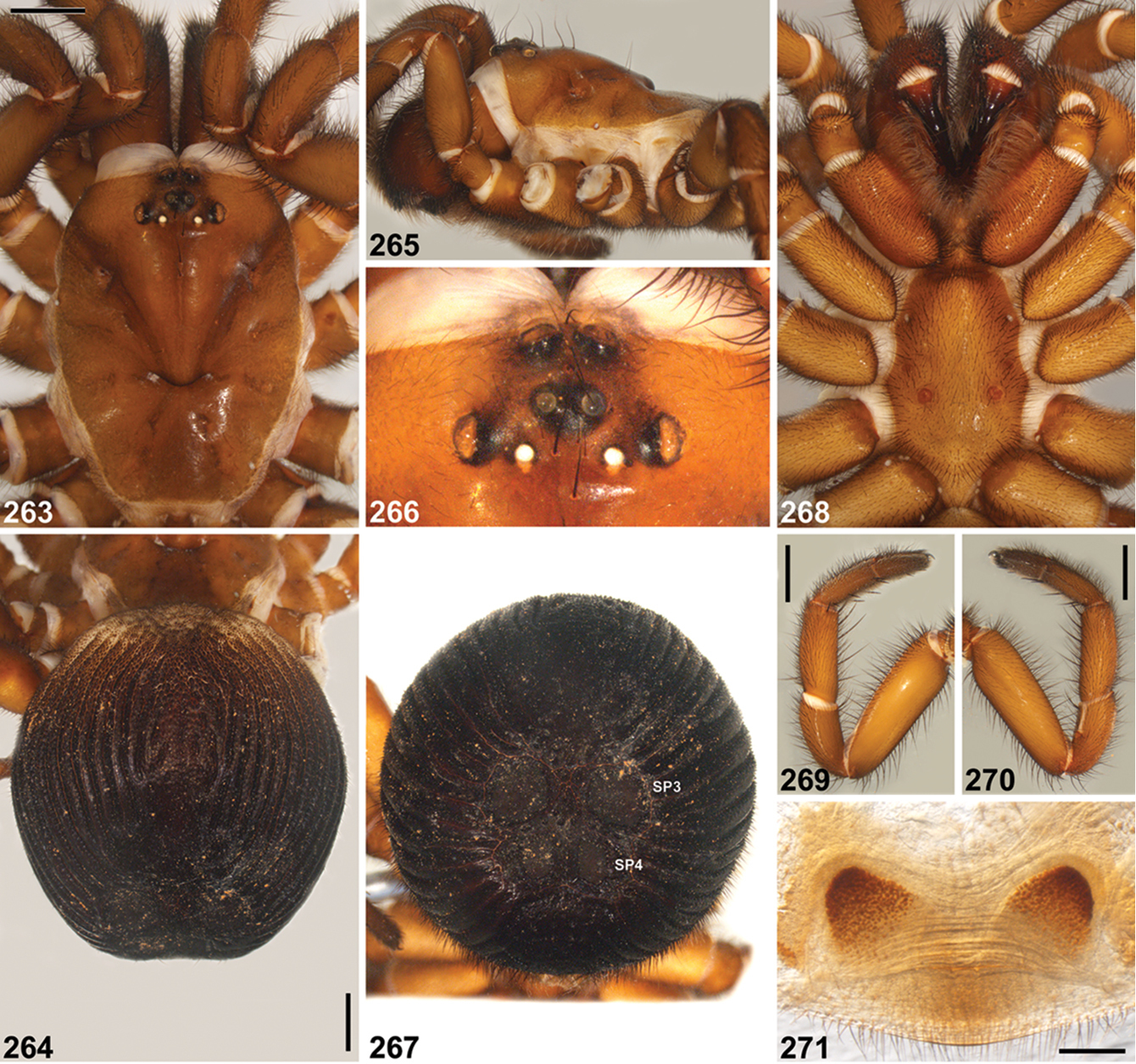
Female specimen
