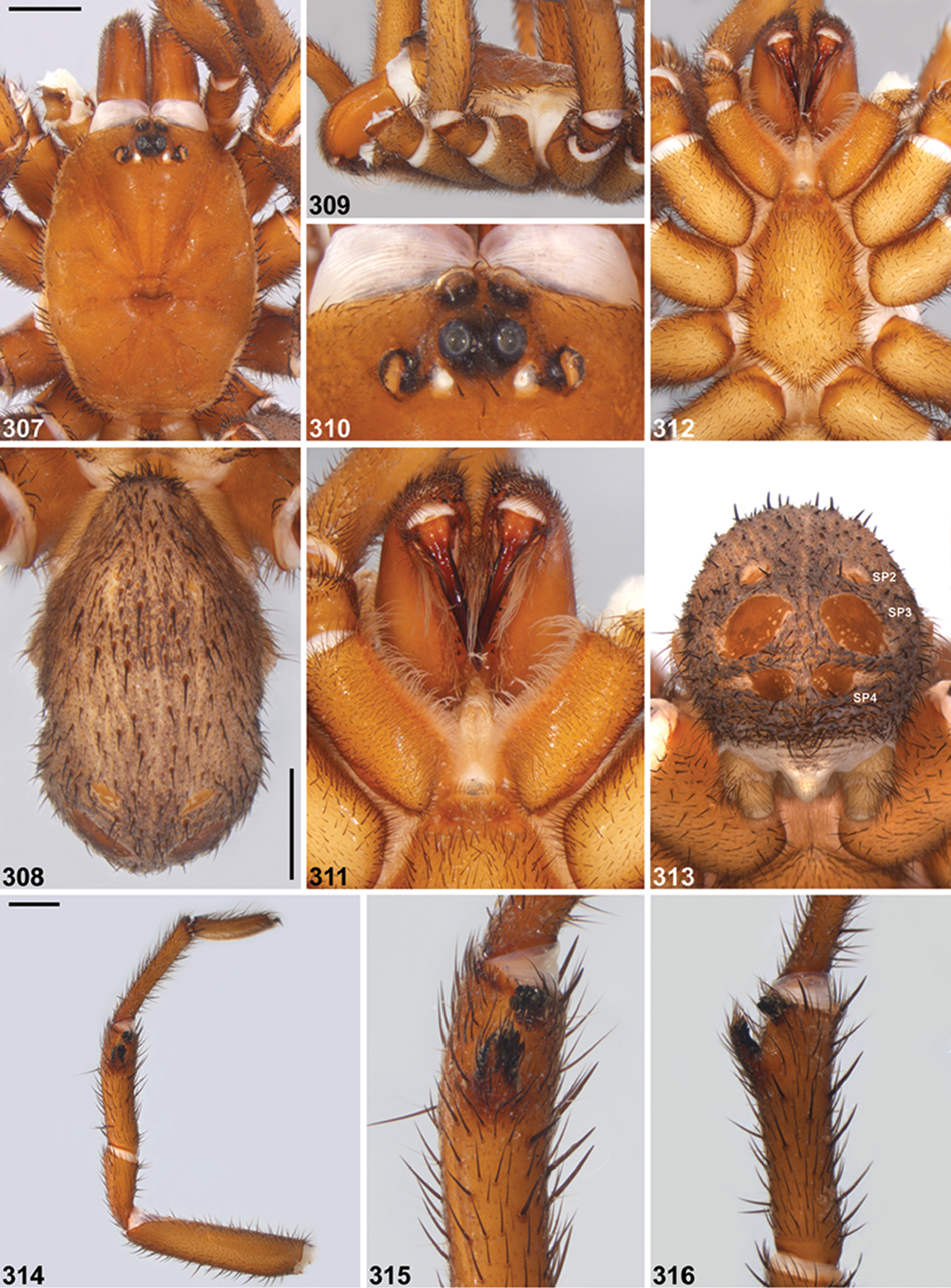
- Male holotype

Scientific classification
- Kingdom: Animalia
- Phylum: Arthropoda
- Subphylum: Chelicerata
- Class: Arachnida
- Order: Araneae
- Infraorder: Mygalomorphae
- Family: Idiopidae
- Genus: Idiosoma
- Species: I. mcnamarai

Binomial name
- Idiosoma mcnamarai Rix & Harvey, 2018

= Idiosoma mcnamarai =

Species of spider

Idiosoma mcnamarai is a species of mygalomorph spider in the Idiopidae family. It is endemic to Australia. It was described in 2018 by Australian arachnologists Michael Rix and Mark Harvey. The specific epithet mcnamarai honours Keiran McNamara (1954–2013) for securing funding for the Salinity Action Plan Survey which resulted in the collection of this and other Idiosoma species.

== Distribution and habitat ==
The species occurs in Western Australia in the central-eastern Avon Wheatbelt bioregion. The type locality is Trayning, 236 km east of Perth.

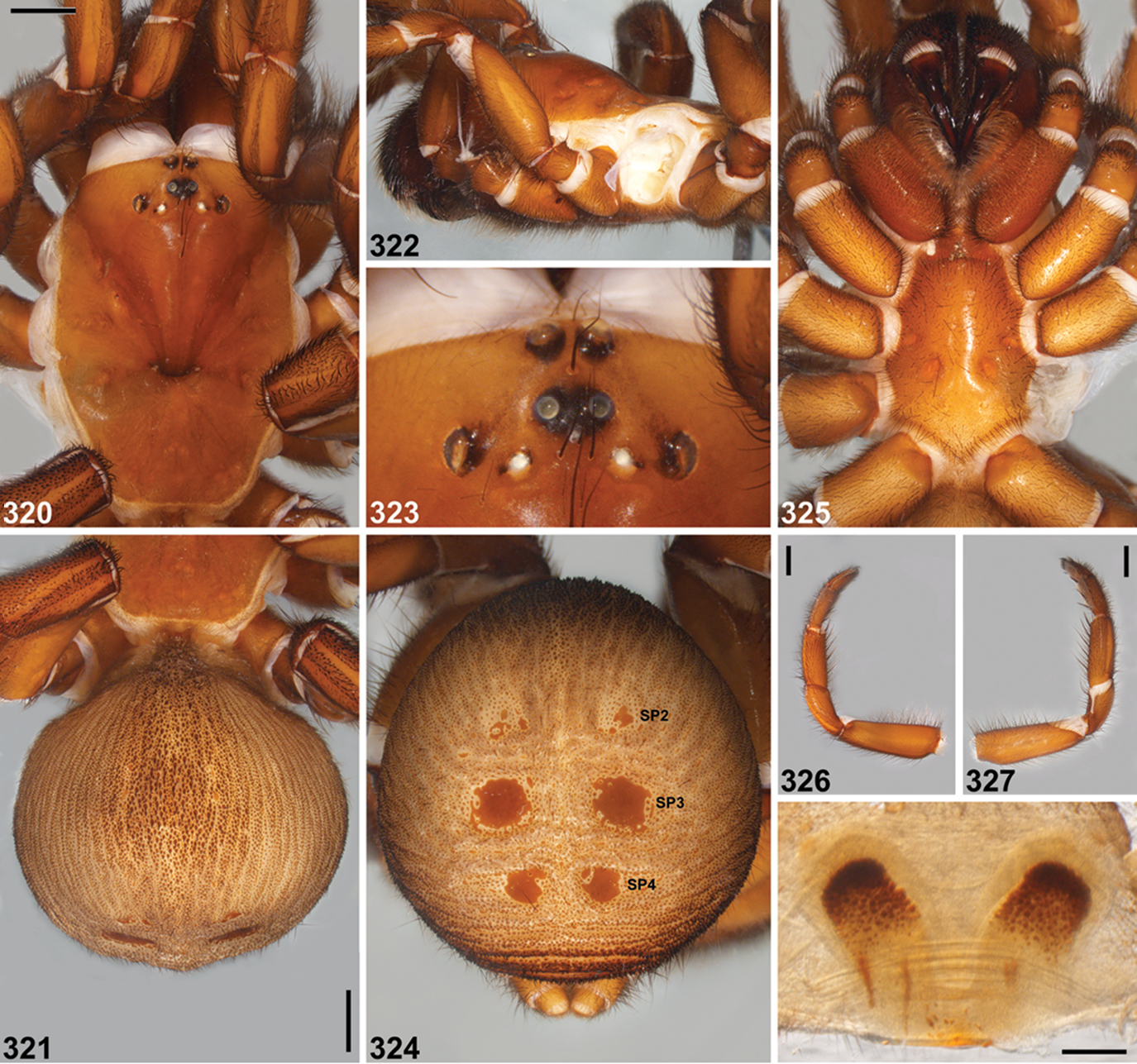
Female specimen
