= Idiosoma castellum =

Scientific classification
- Kingdom: Animalia
- Phylum: Arthropoda
- Subphylum: Chelicerata
- Class: Arachnida
- Order: Araneae
- Infraorder: Mygalomorphae
- Family: Idiopidae
- Genus: Idiosoma
- Species: I. castellum

Binomial name
- Idiosoma castellum (Main, 1986)

Synonyms
- Aganippe castellum Main, 1986

Australian spider

Idiosoma castellum is a trapdoor spider in the Arbanitinae subfamily of the Idiopidae family. It was first described as Aganippe castellum by Barbara York Main in 1986. In 2017 Michael Rix and others transferred it to the genus, Idiosoma, to give the name Idiosoma castellum, (the name accepted by the Australian Faunal Directory, and the World Spider Catalog).

It is found only in the south-west of Western Australia.
