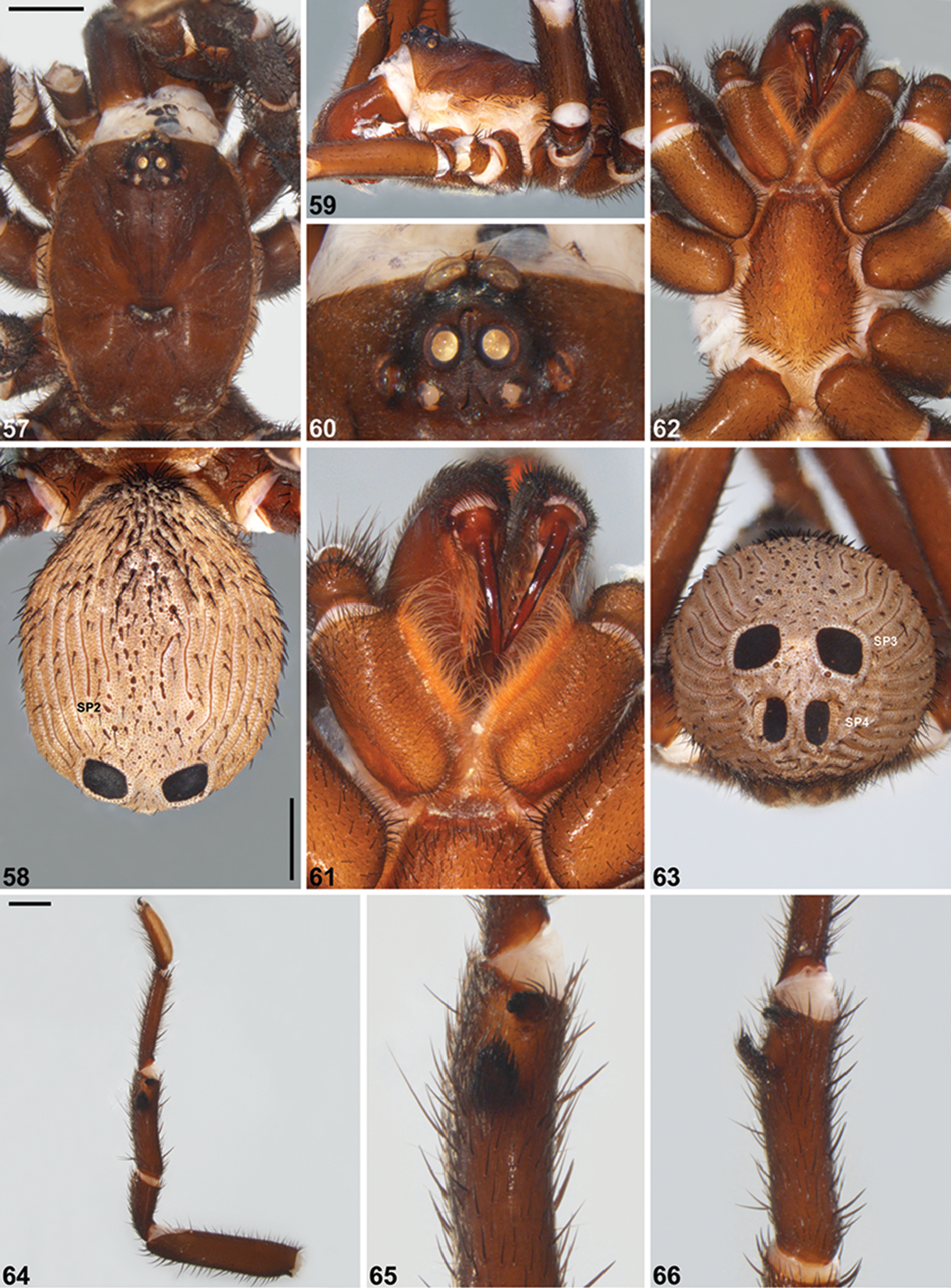
- Figs 57-66 from Zookeys

Scientific classification
- Kingdom: Animalia
- Phylum: Arthropoda
- Subphylum: Chelicerata
- Class: Arachnida
- Order: Araneae
- Infraorder: Mygalomorphae
- Family: Idiopidae
- Genus: Idiosoma
- Species: I. arenaceum

Binomial name
- Idiosoma arenaceum Rix & Harvey, 2018

= Idiosoma arenaceum =

Australian spider

Idiosoma arenaceum is a trapdoor spider in the Arbanitinae subfamily of the Idiopidae family. It was first described in 2018 by Michael G. Rix, Mark Harvey and others.

It is found in the Geraldton sandplains of Western Australia.
