= Idiosoma smeatoni =

Scientific classification
- Kingdom: Animalia
- Phylum: Arthropoda
- Subphylum: Chelicerata
- Class: Arachnida
- Order: Araneae
- Infraorder: Mygalomorphae
- Family: Idiopidae
- Genus: Idiosoma
- Species: I. smeatoni

Binomial name
- Idiosoma smeatoni (Hogg, 1902)

Synonyms
- Aganippe smeatoni Hogg, 1902

Species of spider

Idiosoma smeatoni is a species of mygalomorph spider in the Idiopidae family. It is endemic to Australia. It was described in 1902 by British arachnologist Henry Roughton Hogg. The specific epithet honours banker and amateur scientist Thomas Drury Smeaton who provided type specimens of the spiders to the South Australian Museum.

== Distribution and habitat ==
The species occurs in South Australia, in open forest habitats. The type locality is Blakiston in the Mount Lofty Ranges, some 36 km south-east of Adelaide.

== Behaviour ==
The spiders are fossorial, terrestrial predators.
