= Idiosoma occidentale =

Scientific classification
- Kingdom: Animalia
- Phylum: Arthropoda
- Subphylum: Chelicerata
- Class: Arachnida
- Order: Araneae
- Infraorder: Mygalomorphae
- Family: Idiopidae
- Genus: Idiosoma
- Species: I. occidentale

Binomial name
- Idiosoma occidentale (Hogg, 1903)

Synonyms
- Aganippe occidentalis Hogg, 1903

Species of spider

Idiosoma occidentale is a species of mygalomorph spider in the Idiopidae family. It is endemic to Australia. It was described in 1903 by British arachnologist Henry Roughton Hogg.

== Distribution and habitat ==
The species occurs in north-west Western Australia. The type locality is Roebourne in the Pilbara region, some 1,560 km north of Perth.

== Behaviour ==
The spiders are fossorial, terrestrial predators.
