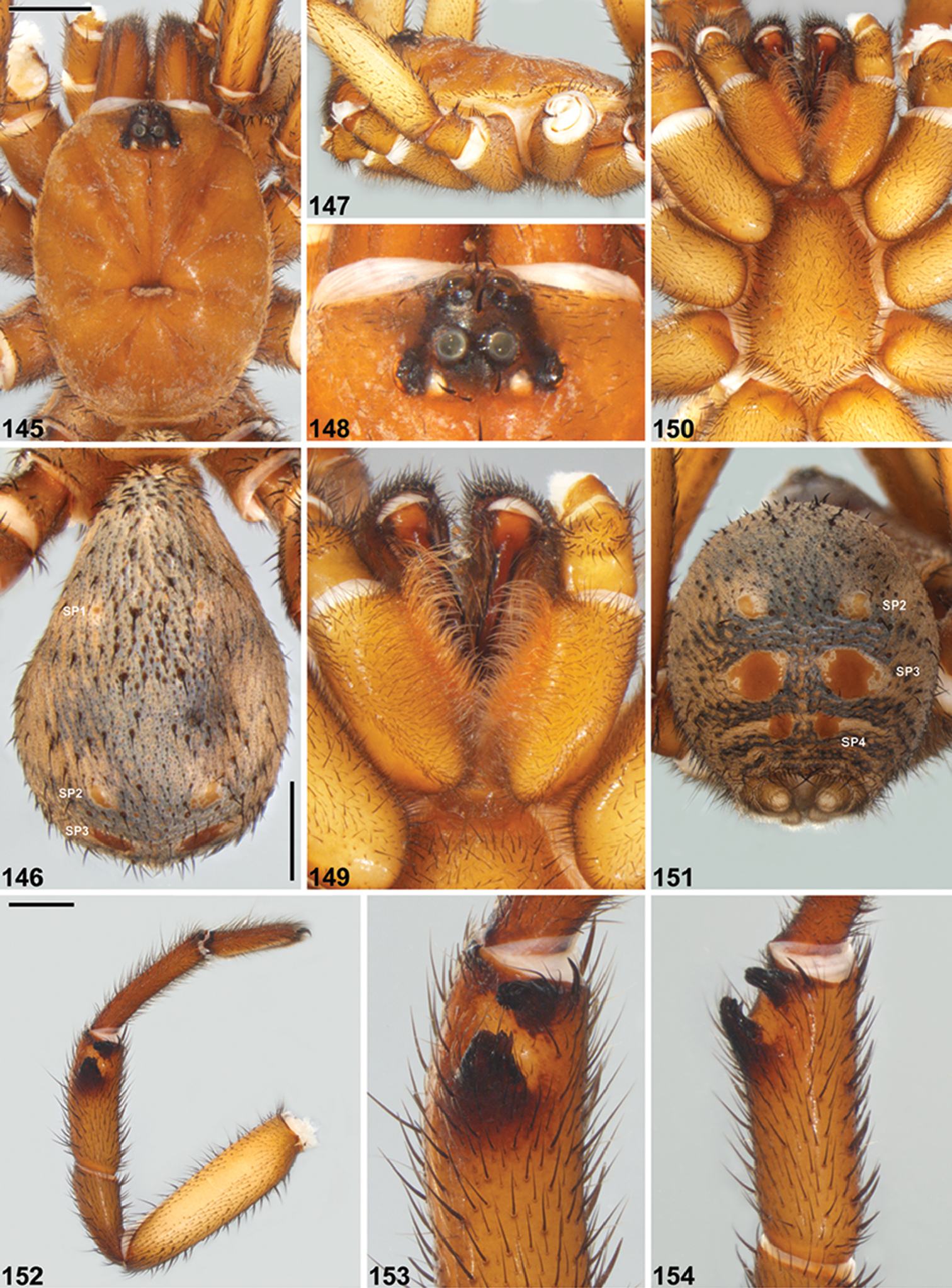
- Male holotype

Scientific classification
- Kingdom: Animalia
- Phylum: Arthropoda
- Subphylum: Chelicerata
- Class: Arachnida
- Order: Araneae
- Infraorder: Mygalomorphae
- Family: Idiopidae
- Genus: Idiosoma
- Species: I. formosum

Binomial name
- Idiosoma formosum Rix & Harvey, 2018

= Idiosoma formosum =

Species of spider

Idiosoma formosum is a species of mygalomorph spider in the Idiopidae family. It is endemic to Australia. It was described in 2018 by Australian arachnologists Michael Rix and Mark Harvey. The specific epithet formosum comes from Latin formosus (‘beautiful’), in reference to the ornate colouration of the abdomen.

== Distribution and habitat ==
The species occurs in a restricted area of south-west Western Australia, in the Lake Moore catchment near the junction of the Avon Wheatbelt, Coolgardie and Yalgoo bioregions. The type locality is Mount Gibson Station, some 90 km north-east of Wubin and 350 km north-east of Perth.

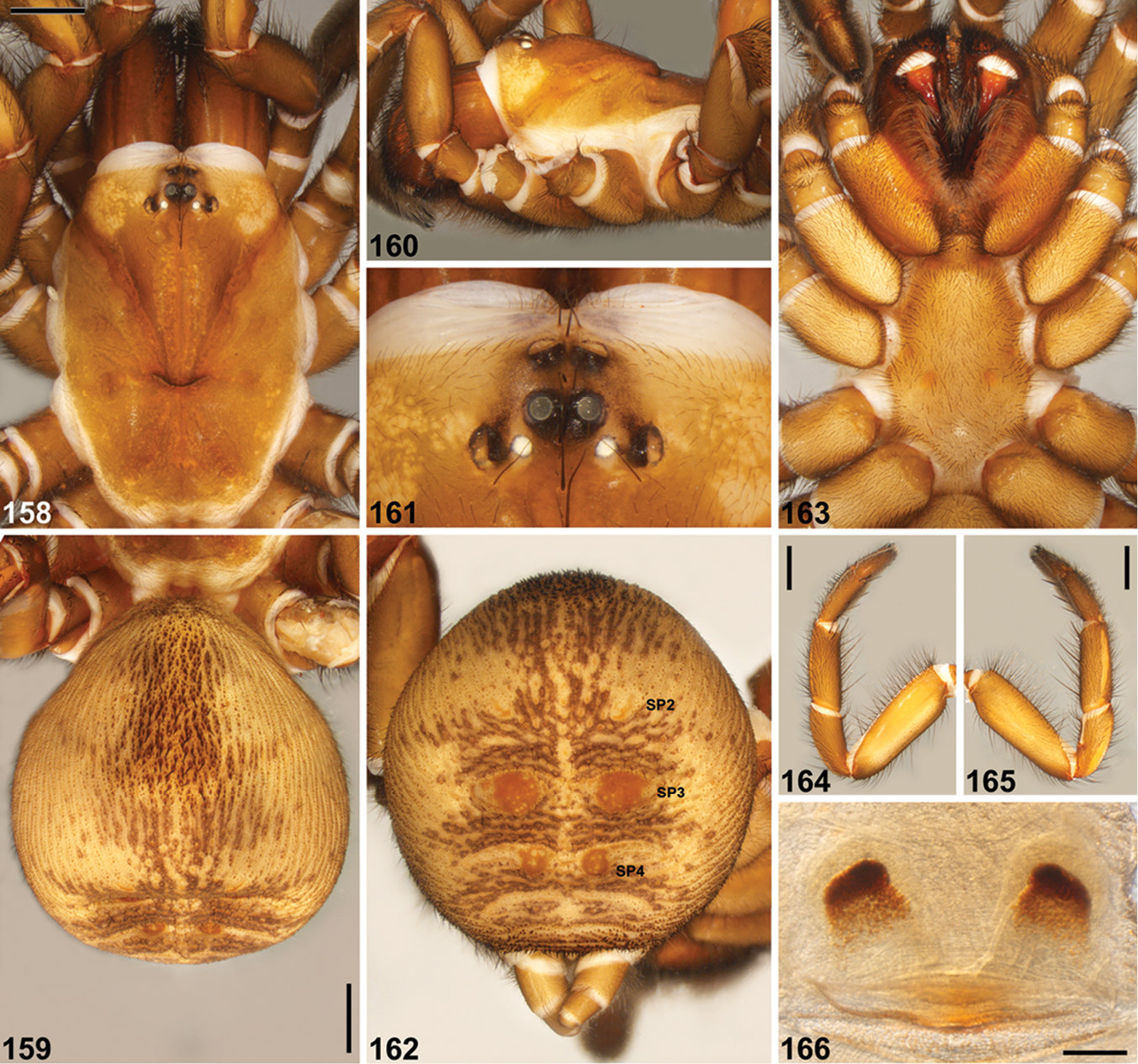
Female paratype
