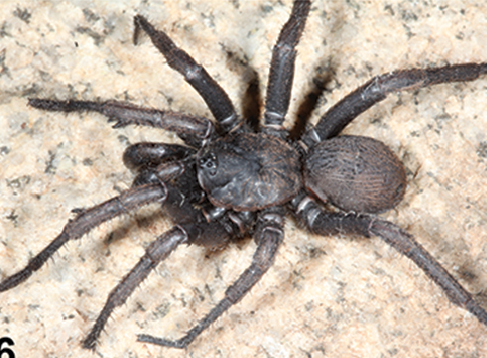

Scientific classification
- Kingdom: Animalia
- Phylum: Arthropoda
- Subphylum: Chelicerata
- Class: Arachnida
- Order: Araneae
- Infraorder: Mygalomorphae
- Family: Idiopidae
- Genus: Idiosoma
- Species: I. sigillatum

Binomial name
- Idiosoma sigillatum (O.P.-Cambridge, 1870)

Synonyms
- Idiops sigillatus O.P.-Cambridge, 1870; Idiosoma hirsutum Main, 1952

= Idiosoma sigillatum =

Species of spider

Idiosoma sigillatum is a species of mygalomorph spider in the Idiopidae family. It is endemic to Australia. It was described in 1870 by British arachnologist Octavius Pickard-Cambridge.

== Distribution and habitat ==
The species occurs in south-west Western Australia, in the Swan Coastal Plain and Jarrah Forest bioregions, including the Darling Scarp and Rottnest Island, in open forest habitats. The type locality is Swan River (Perth).

== Behaviour ==
The spiders are fossorial, terrestrial predators. They construct burrows with trapdoors in plant litter on sandy-gravel soils, with a fan of twig-lines around the entrance.
