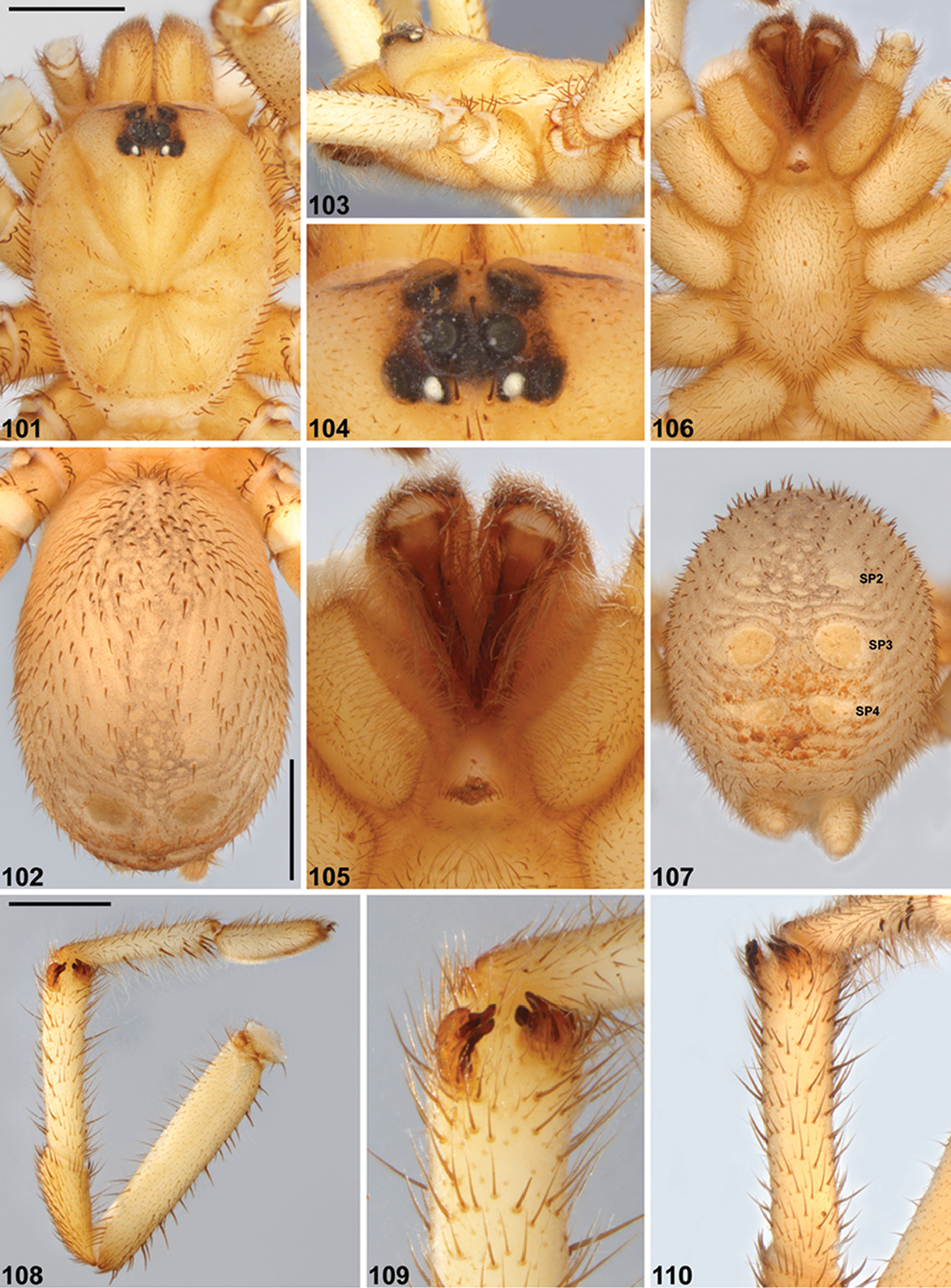
- Male holotype

Scientific classification
- Kingdom: Animalia
- Phylum: Arthropoda
- Subphylum: Chelicerata
- Class: Arachnida
- Order: Araneae
- Infraorder: Mygalomorphae
- Family: Idiopidae
- Genus: Idiosoma
- Species: I. corrugatum

Binomial name
- Idiosoma corrugatum Rix & Harvey, 2018

= Idiosoma corrugatum =

Species of spider

Idiosoma corrugatum is a species of mygalomorph spider in the Idiopidae family. It is endemic to Australia. It was described in 2018 by Australian arachnologists Michael Rix and Mark Harvey. The specific epithet corrugatum (from Latin corrugatus: ‘ridged’) refers to the corrugated abdomen.

== Distribution and habitat ==
The species occurs in South Australia where it has a restricted distribution in the central-eastern Eyre Peninsula. The type locality is 86 km south-west of Kimba.

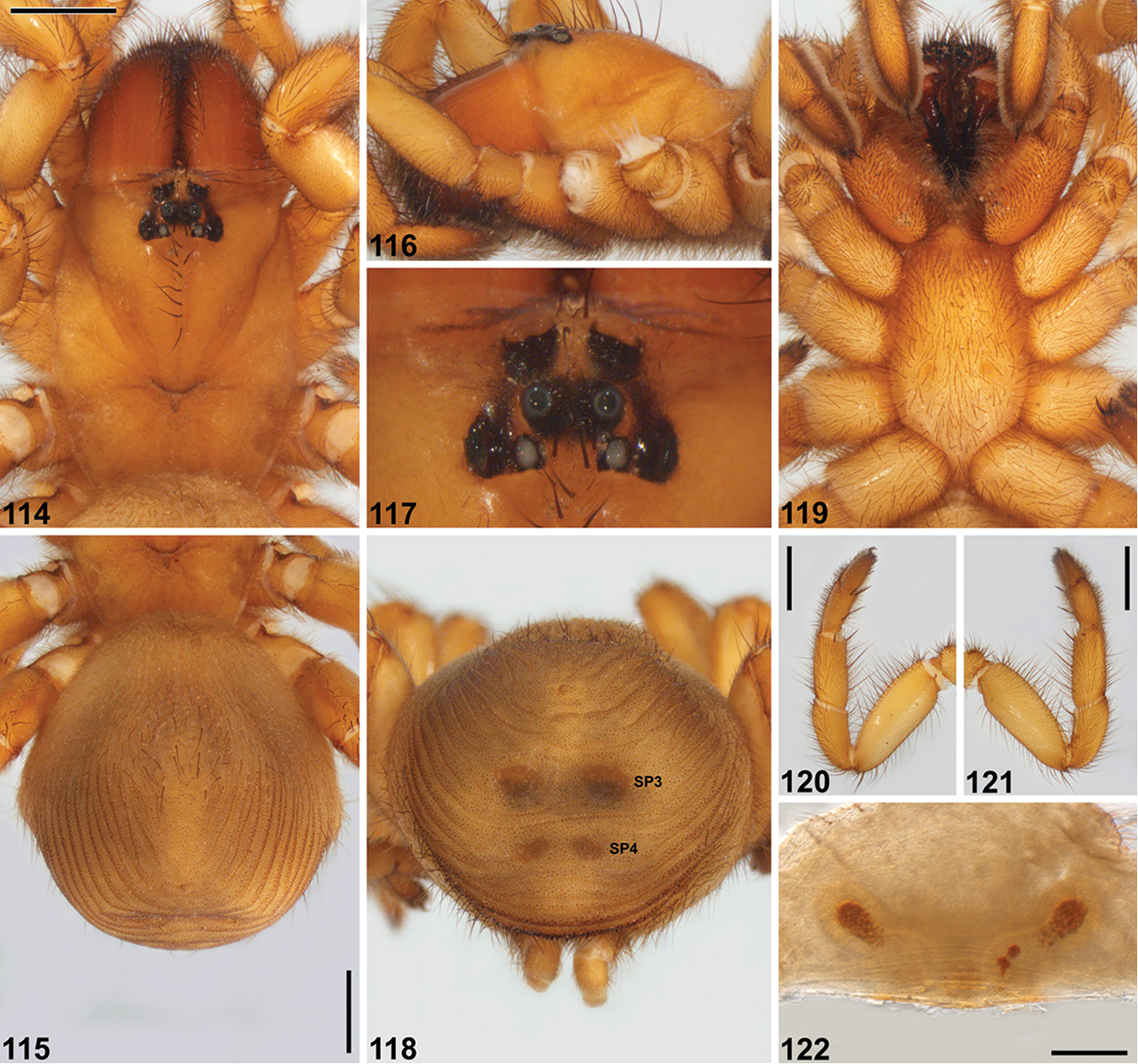
Female specimen
