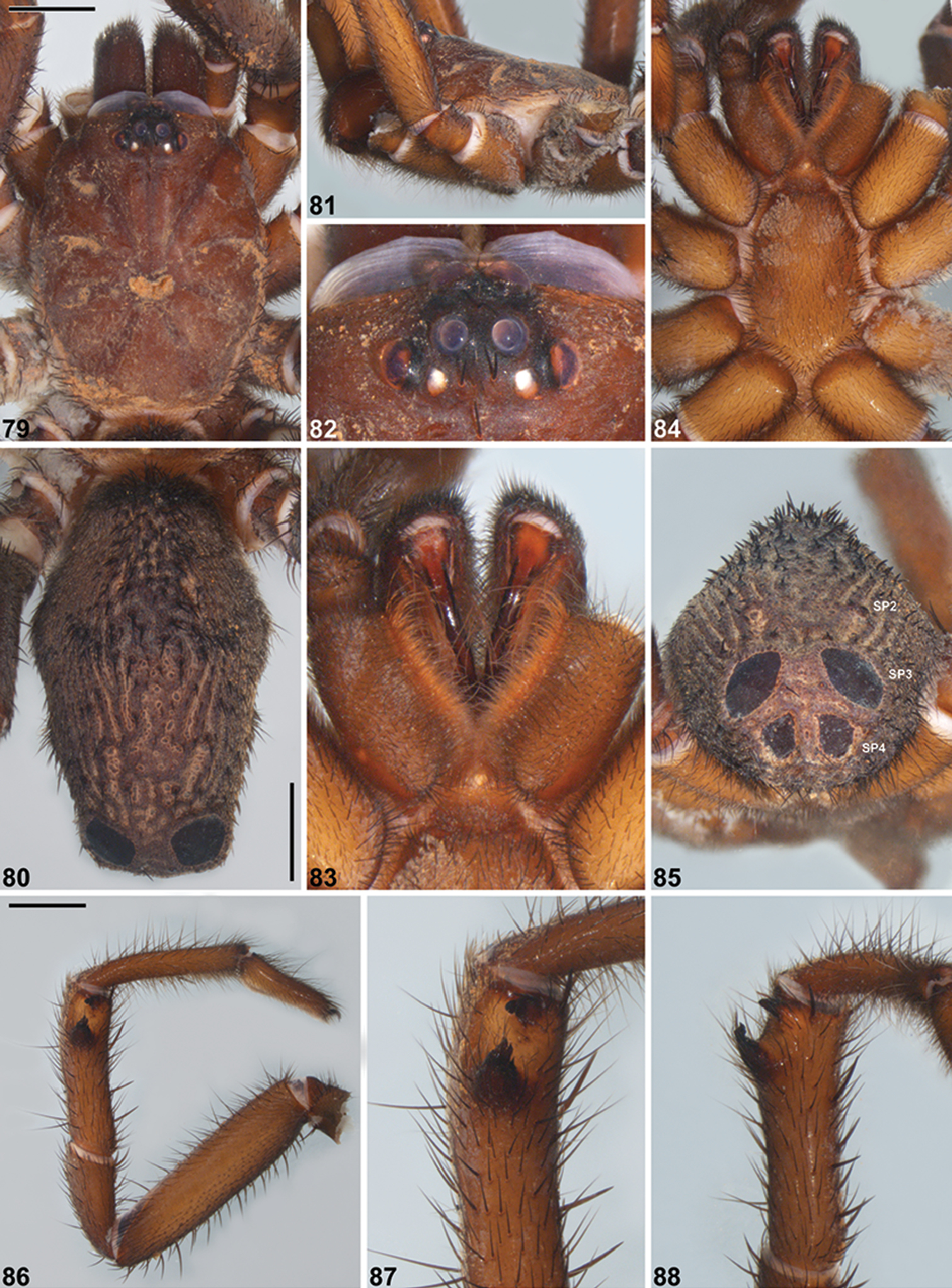
- Figs 79-88 (From zookeys)

Scientific classification
- Kingdom: Animalia
- Phylum: Arthropoda
- Subphylum: Chelicerata
- Class: Arachnida
- Order: Araneae
- Infraorder: Mygalomorphae
- Family: Idiopidae
- Genus: Idiosoma
- Species: I. clypeatum

Binomial name
- Idiosoma clypeatum Rix & Harvey, 2018

= Idiosoma clypeatum =

Australian spider

Holotype site: Albion Downs, 70.1 km NNW of Leinster, WA'"`UNIQ--ref-00000008-QINU`"'

Idiosoma clypeatum is a trapdoor spider in the Arbanitinae subfamily of the Idiopidae family. It was first described in 2018 by Michael G. Rix, Mark Harvey and others.

It is found in the Murchison and Yalgoo IBRA regions of Western Australia.
