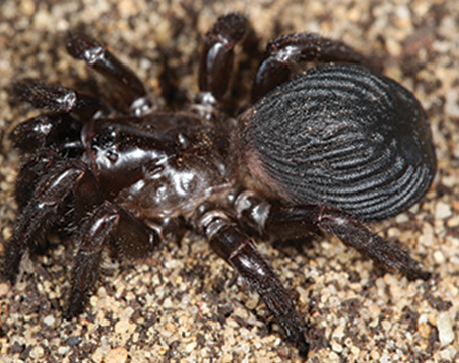

Scientific classification
- Kingdom: Animalia
- Phylum: Arthropoda
- Subphylum: Chelicerata
- Class: Arachnida
- Order: Araneae
- Infraorder: Mygalomorphae
- Family: Idiopidae
- Genus: Idiosoma
- Species: I. nigrum

Binomial name
- Idiosoma nigrum Main, 1952
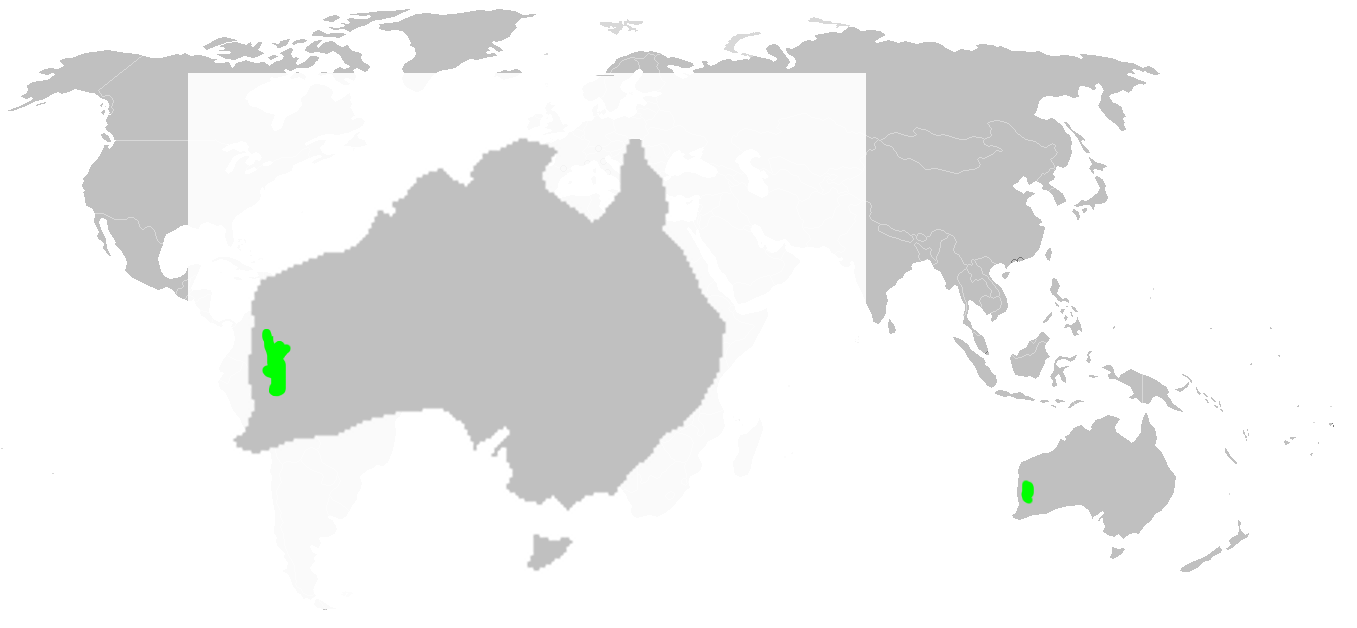

= Idiosoma nigrum =

Black rugose trapdoor spider from Australia

Idiosoma nigrum, also called black rugose trapdoor spider, occurs only in south-western Western Australia, in dry woodlands east of the Darling Scarp and north to Moore River.

Females can reach a length of about 30mm, males about 18mm.

Idiosoma nigrum digs burrows up to 32 cm deep.

== Name ==
The species name is derived from Latin Niger "black".
