= Idiosoma subtriste =

Scientific classification
- Kingdom: Animalia
- Phylum: Arthropoda
- Subphylum: Chelicerata
- Class: Arachnida
- Order: Araneae
- Infraorder: Mygalomorphae
- Family: Idiopidae
- Genus: Idiosoma
- Species: I. subtriste

Binomial name
- Idiosoma subtriste (O.P.-Cambridge, 1877)

Synonyms
- Aganippe subtristis O.P.-Cambridge, 1877; Idiommata schomburgki Karsch, 1878; Aganippe pulleinei Hogg, 1902

Species of spider

Idiosoma subtriste is a species of mygalomorph spider in the Idiopidae family. It is endemic to Australia. It was described in 1877 by British arachnologist Octavius Pickard-Cambridge.

== Distribution and habitat ==
The species occurs in South Australia, in the Mount Lofty and Flinders Ranges, in open scrub and woodland habitats. The type locality is Adelaide.

== Behaviour ==
The spiders are fossorial, terrestrial predators.
