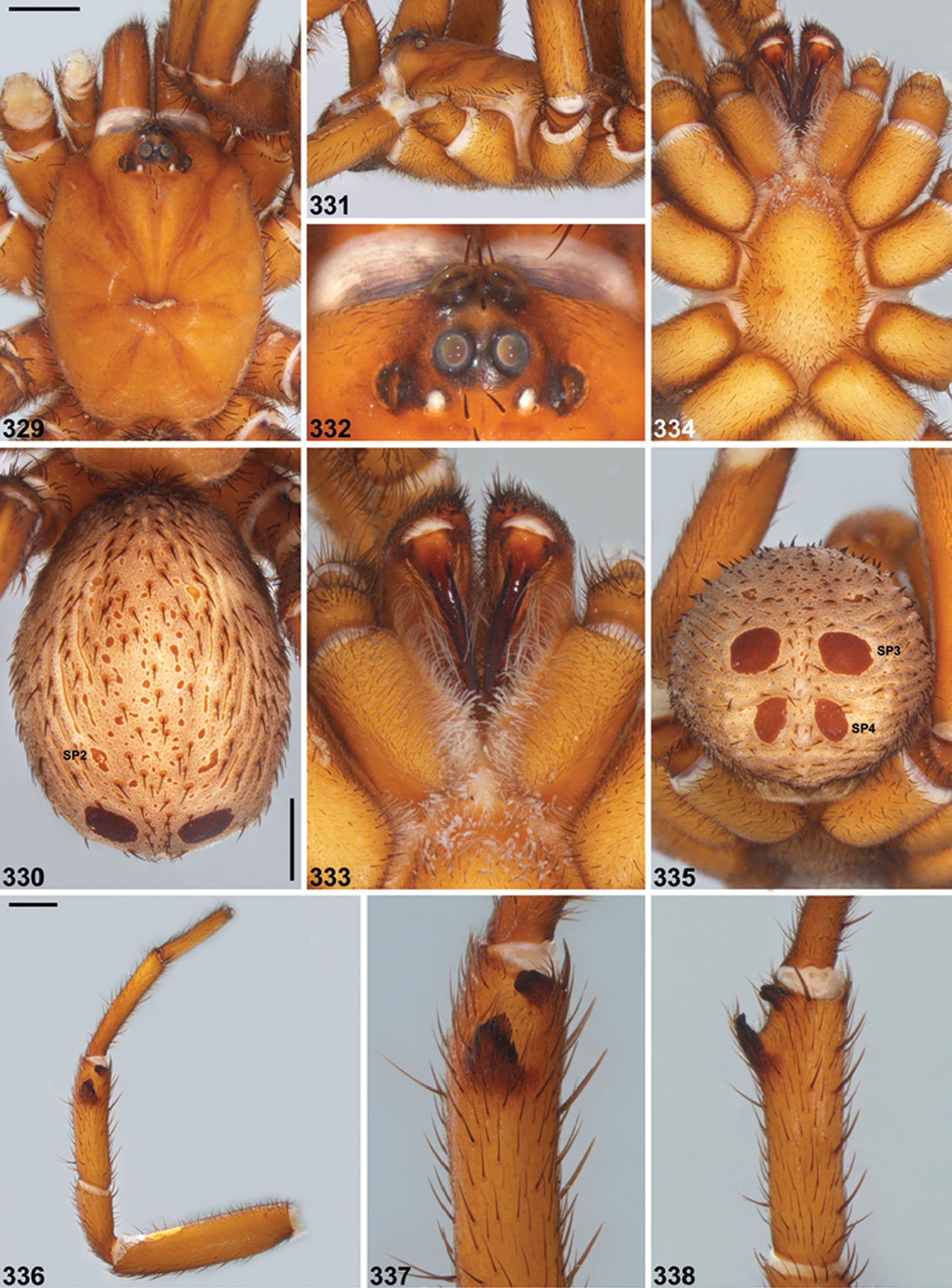
- Male holotype

Scientific classification
- Kingdom: Animalia
- Phylum: Arthropoda
- Subphylum: Chelicerata
- Class: Arachnida
- Order: Araneae
- Infraorder: Mygalomorphae
- Family: Idiopidae
- Genus: Idiosoma
- Species: I. schoknechtorum

Binomial name
- Idiosoma schoknechtorum Rix & Harvey, 2018

= Idiosoma schoknechtorum =

Species of spider

Idiosoma schoknechtorum is a species of mygalomorph spider in the Idiopidae family. It is endemic to Australia. It was described in 2018 by Australian arachnologists Michael Rix and Mark Harvey. The specific epithet schoknechtorum honours Daniel and Noel Schoknecht, for collecting an important female specimen on their property.

== Distribution and habitat ==
The species occurs in Western Australia in the central-western Avon Wheatbelt and north-eastern Jarrah Forest bioregions. The type locality is Beverley, 133 km south-east of Perth.

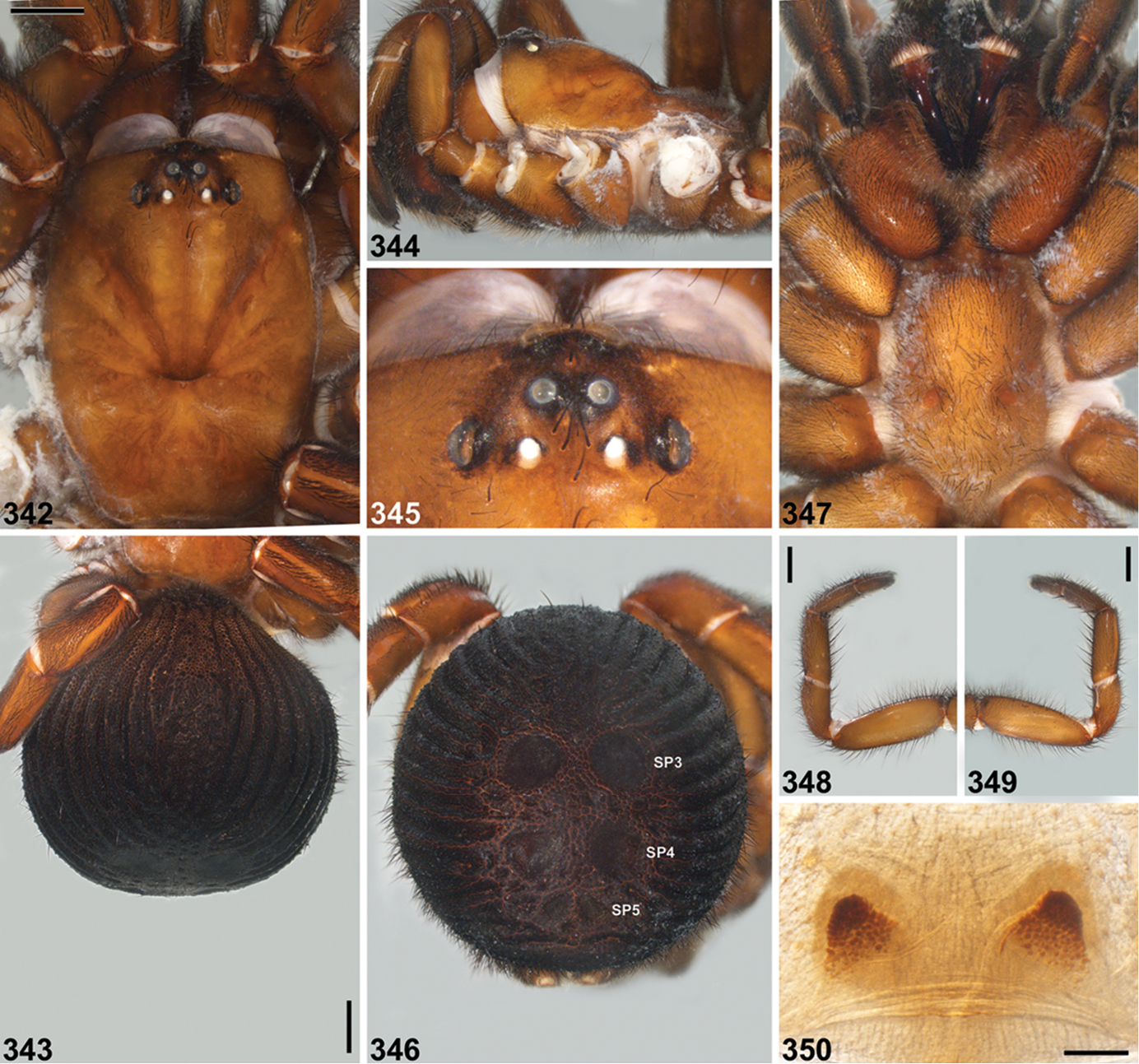
Female specimen
