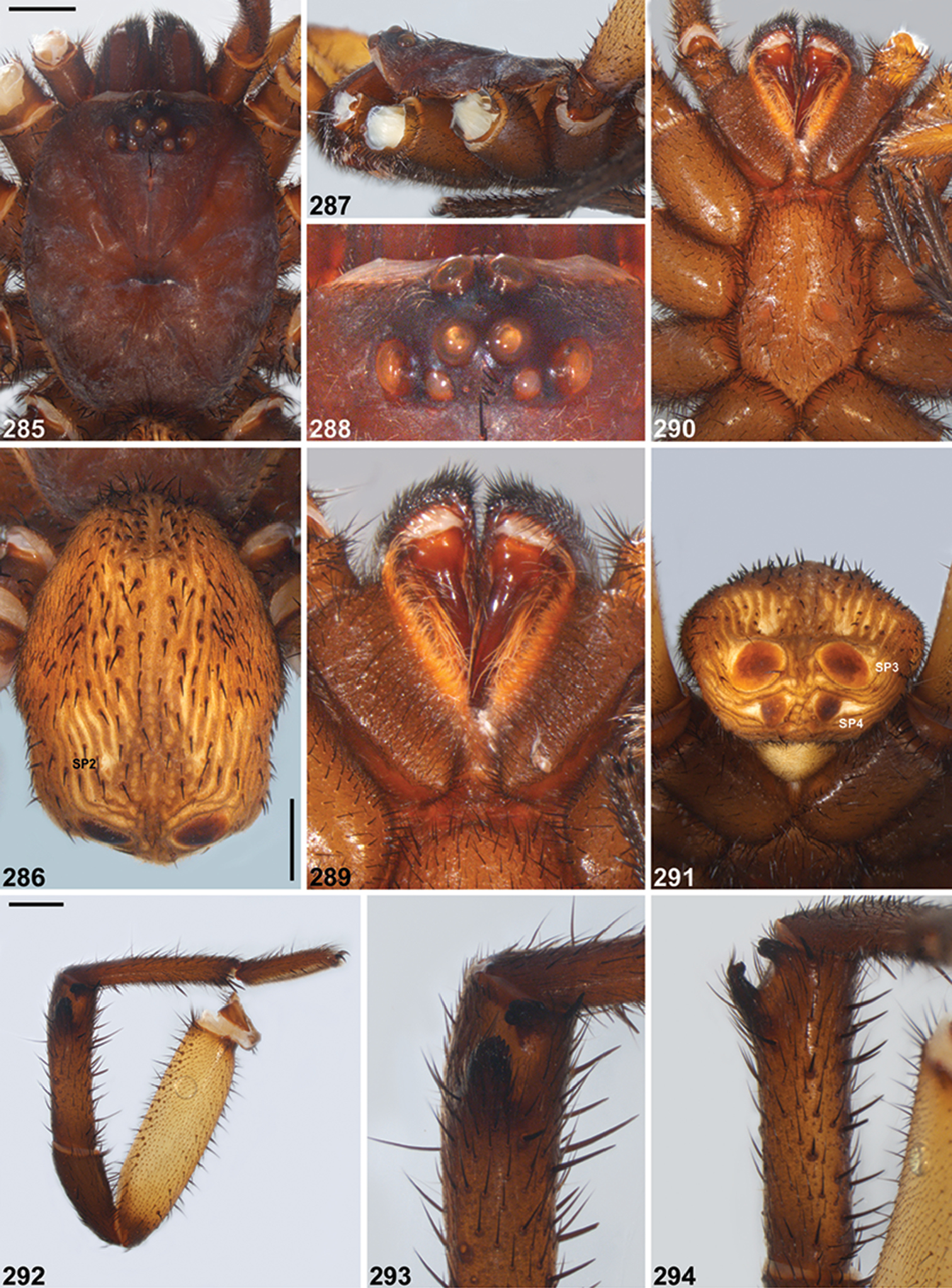
- Male holotype

Scientific classification
- Kingdom: Animalia
- Phylum: Arthropoda
- Subphylum: Chelicerata
- Class: Arachnida
- Order: Araneae
- Infraorder: Mygalomorphae
- Family: Idiopidae
- Genus: Idiosoma
- Species: I. mcclementsorum

Binomial name
- Idiosoma mcclementsorum Rix & Harvey, 2018

= Idiosoma mcclementsorum =

Species of spider

Idiosoma mcclementsorum is a species of mygalomorph spider in the Idiopidae family. It is endemic to Australia. It was described in 2018 by Australian arachnologists Michael Rix and Mark Harvey. The specific epithet mcclementsorum honours James and Meredith McClements for their support for the Western Australian Museum Foundation.

== Distribution and habitat ==
The species occurs in south-west Western Australia in the Avon Wheatbelt, Jarrah Forest and Swan Coastal Plain bioregions. The type locality is Julimar Conservation Park, 60 km north-east of Perth.

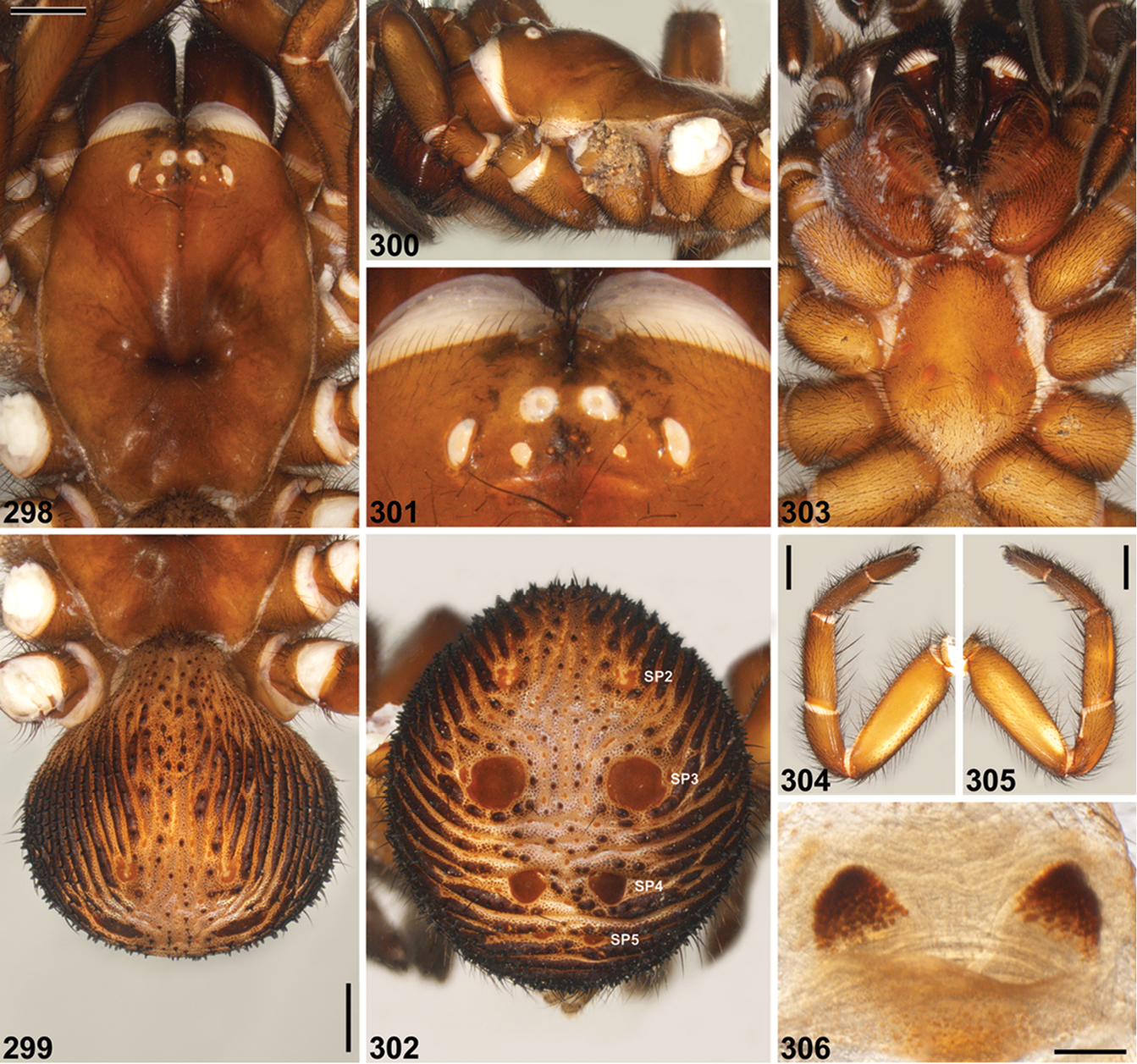
Female paratype
