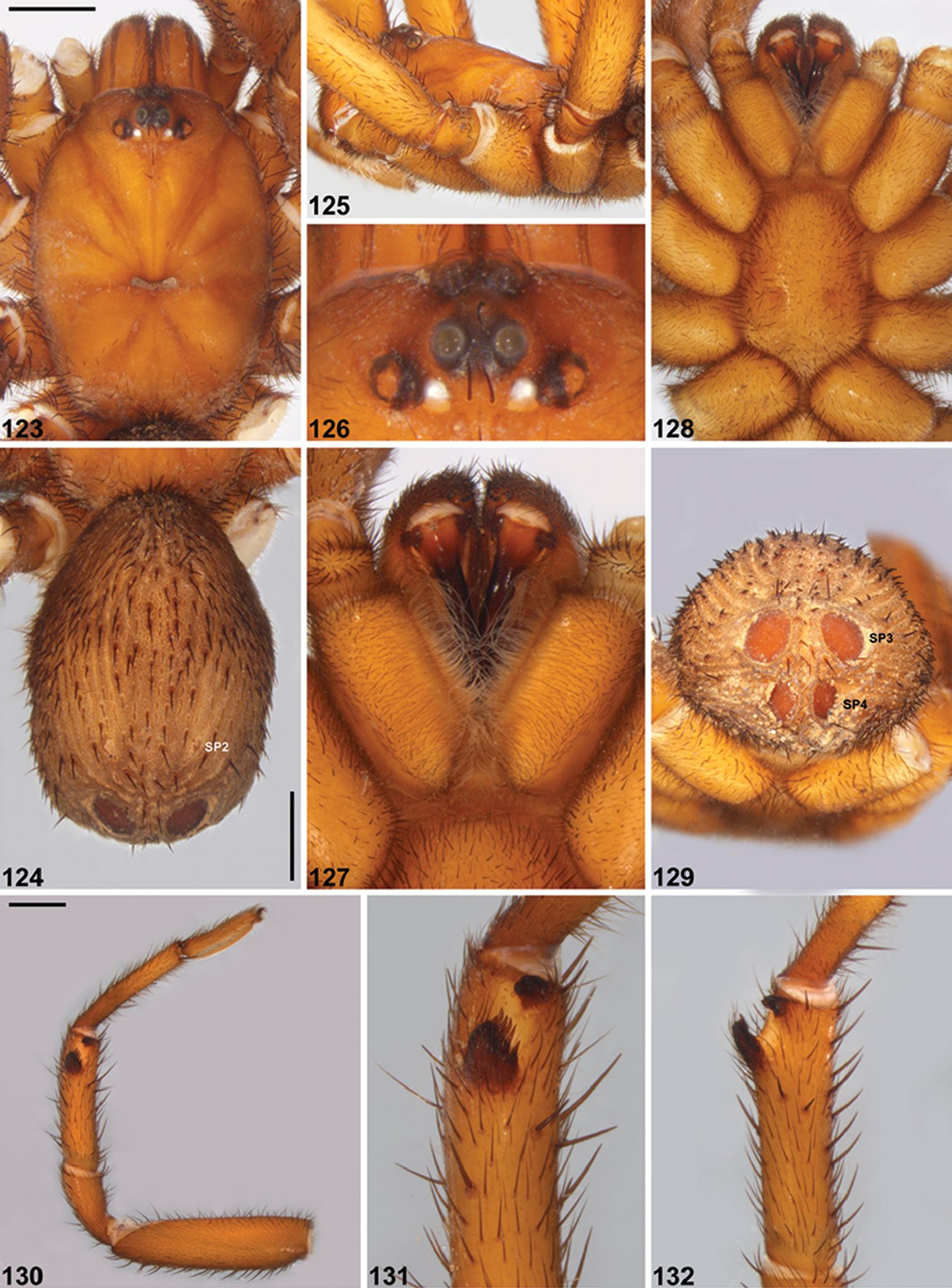
- Male holotype

Scientific classification
- Kingdom: Animalia
- Phylum: Arthropoda
- Subphylum: Chelicerata
- Class: Arachnida
- Order: Araneae
- Infraorder: Mygalomorphae
- Family: Idiopidae
- Genus: Idiosoma
- Species: I. dandaragan

Binomial name
- Idiosoma dandaragan Rix & Harvey, 2018

= Idiosoma dandaragan =

Species of spider

Idiosoma dandaragan is a species of mygalomorph spider in the Idiopidae family. It is endemic to Australia. It was described in 2018 by Australian arachnologists Michael Rix and Mark Harvey. The specific epithet dandaragan refers to the type locality.

== Distribution and habitat ==
The species occurs in south-west Western Australia, in the Avon Wheatbelt, Jarrah Forest and Swan Coastal Plain bioregions. The type locality is 19.5 km south of Moora, on the Dandaragan Plateau north of Perth.

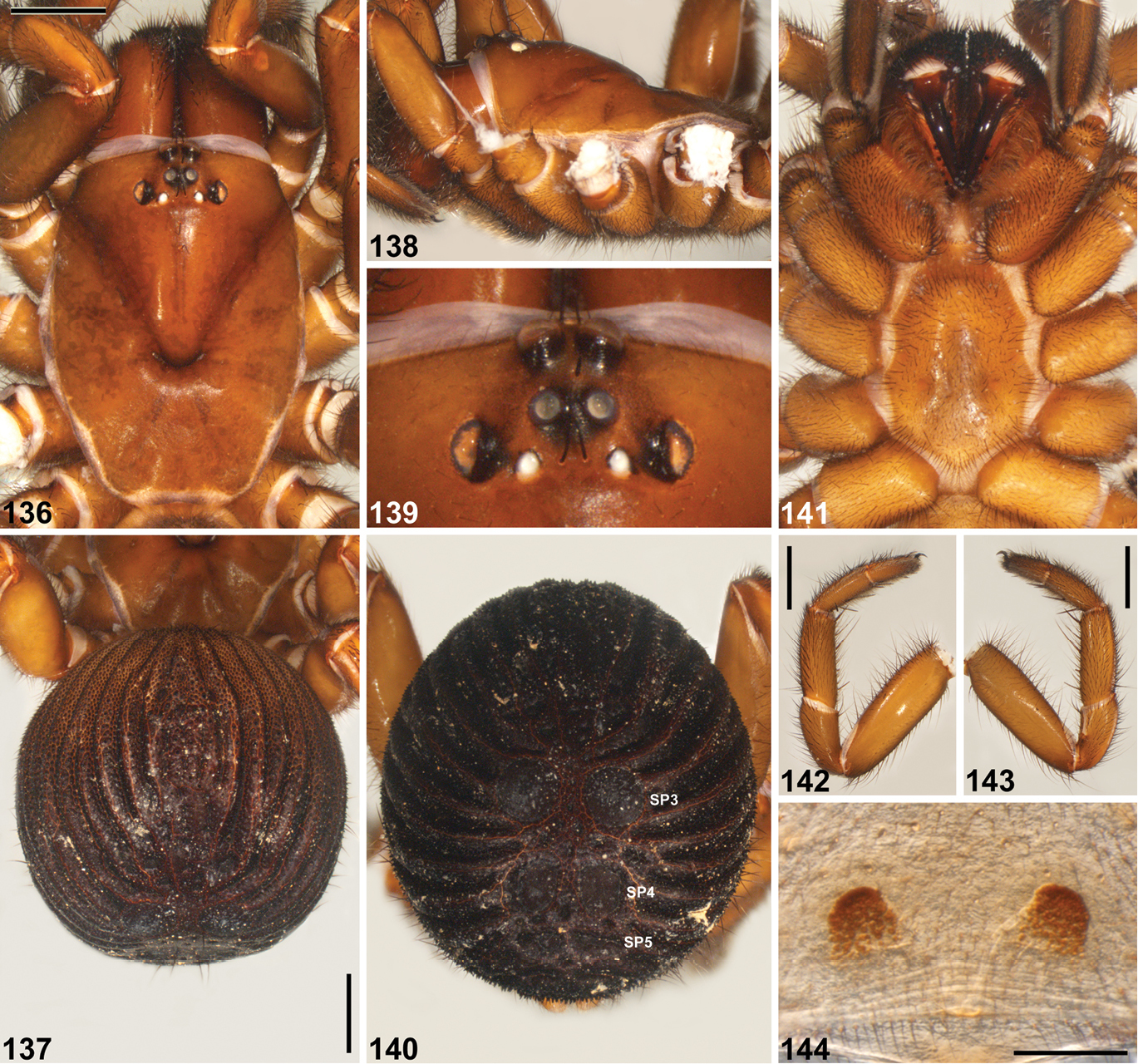
Female specimen
