= Idiosoma cupulifex =

Scientific classification
- Kingdom: Animalia
- Phylum: Arthropoda
- Subphylum: Chelicerata
- Class: Arachnida
- Order: Araneae
- Infraorder: Mygalomorphae
- Family: Idiopidae
- Genus: Idiosoma
- Species: I. cupulifex

Binomial name
- Idiosoma cupulifex (Main, 1957)

Synonyms
- Aganippe cupulifex Main, 1957

Australian spider

Idiosoma cupulifex is a trapdoor spider in the Arbanitinae subfamily of the Idiopidae family. It was first described as Aganippe cupulifex by Barbara York Main in 1957. In 2017 Michael Rix and others transferred it to the genus, Idiosoma, to give the name Idiosoma cupulifex, (the name accepted by the Australian Faunal Directory, and the World Spider Catalog, and GBIF).

It is found only in the south-west of Western Australia, in open forest and woodland.
