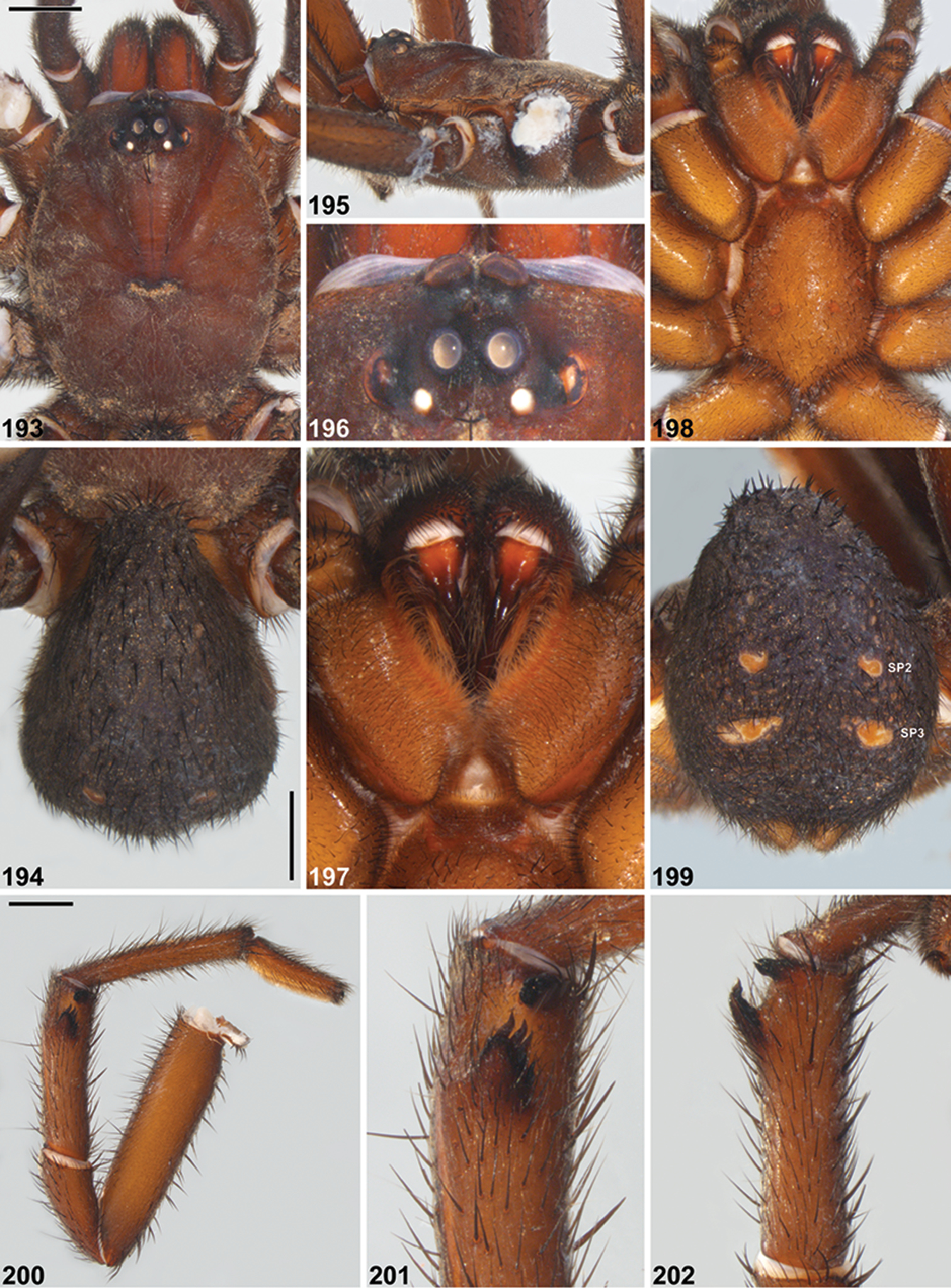
- Male holotype

Scientific classification
- Kingdom: Animalia
- Phylum: Arthropoda
- Subphylum: Chelicerata
- Class: Arachnida
- Order: Araneae
- Infraorder: Mygalomorphae
- Family: Idiopidae
- Genus: Idiosoma
- Species: I. incomptum

Binomial name
- Idiosoma incomptum Rix & Harvey, 2018

= Idiosoma incomptum =

Species of spider

Idiosoma incomptum is a species of mygalomorph spider in the Idiopidae family. It is endemic to Australia. It was described in 2018 by Australian arachnologists Michael Rix and Mark Harvey. The specific epithet incomptum comes from Latin incomptus (‘unadorned’), in reference to the small sigilla and largely unsclerotised abdomen.

== Distribution and habitat ==
The species occurs in Western Australia, with a near-coastal distribution in the Carnarvon, Geraldton Sandplains and Yalgoo bioregions. The type locality is Carnarvon.
