= William Henry Ford =

South African architect (1868-1921)

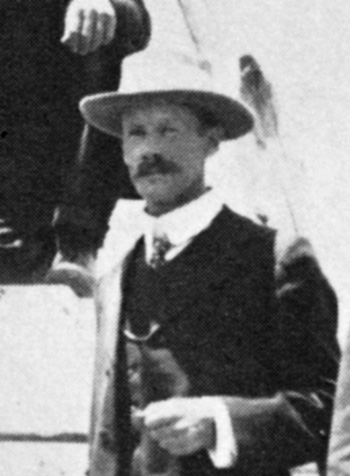
- Born: William Henry Ford; 1868; Australia
- Died: 1921 (aged 52–53); South Africa
- Occupations: architect, designer

William Henry Ford (1868 – 1921) was a South African architect and designer of Australian origin who was responsible for designing church buildings of the Dutch Reformed Church in South Africa.

== In Australia ==
He lived for a time in Claremont while he and Summerhayes worked on the massive Coolgardie Exhibition Building and other buildings in the Australian goldfields. A fire destroyed the exhibition building on 25 July 1929 after it had been vacant and in disrepair for some time.

Coolgardie was Western Australia's third largest settlement in the days when Ford lived there, with 60 shops, 26 hotels, four clubs, three breweries, seven newspapers, six banks, two stock exchanges, 25 stockbrokers, four schools, two theatres, numerous places of worship and a racecourse. In 1899 the town hosted its own Great Exhibition, called "The Western Australian International Mining and Industrial Exhibition". This required the construction of a massive exhibition building, designed by Ford and Summerhayes. Some 61,000 people visited the exhibition, but unfortunately it was the beginning of the decline of the unofficial capital of the Eastern Goldfields, as the gold resources began to decline in the early 1900s. The same partnership was responsible for the Coolgardie Town Hall.

== To South Africa ==
During the Second War of Independence he came to South Africa and after the war he focused on the design of Afrikaans-Dutch churches.

== List of churches he designed ==
- Aurora, 1909
- Benoni, 1921
- Burgersdorp, 1913
- Dealesville, 1912
- Frankfort, 1912
- Hanover, 1908
- Heidelberg, Western Cape, 1914
- Jamestown, 1912
- Kroonstad, 1914
- Sterkstroom, 1914
- Ventersburg, 1913
- Vosburg, 1909
- Frankfort Reformed Church, 1913

== Sources ==
- Olivier, ds. P.L. (samesteller), Ons gemeentelike feesalbum. Kaapstad en Pretoria: N.G. Kerk-uitgewers, 1952.
- Artefacts.co.za. URL besoek op 10 Oktober 2013.
- Design and Art Australia Online. URL besoek op 10 Oktober 2013.
