= Galeosoma coronatum =

Scientific classification
- Kingdom: Animalia
- Phylum: Arthropoda
- Subphylum: Chelicerata
- Class: Arachnida
- Order: Araneae
- Infraorder: Mygalomorphae
- Family: Idiopidae
- Genus: Galeosoma
- Species: G. coronatum

Binomial name
- Galeosoma coronatum Hewitt, 1915

Species of spider

Galeosoma coronatum is a species of spider in the family Idiopidae. It is endemic to South Africa.

== Distribution ==
Galeosoma coronatum is recorded from two South African provinces: the Free State and North West. The species is known from Kroonstad, Borakalalo Game Reserve, and Potchefstroom.

== Habitat and ecology ==
The species constructs silk-lined burrows in soil with the entrance closed by a wafer-type trapdoor. It inhabits the Grassland and Savanna biomes at altitudes ranging from 988 to 1,386 metres above sea level.

== Description ==
Galeosoma coronatum is known only from females. The opisthosoma shield is strongly convex throughout, with a well-defined marginal ridge only in its posterior half. A secondary marginal surface with coarser and more sparsely distributed pits than the dorsal surface completely encircles the dorsal surface. The shield bears long hairs over the entire upper surface, and lines of setae adjacent to the shield on the upper and lateral surfaces of the opisthosoma form distinct lines. Total length is approximately 17 mm.

== Subspecies ==
A subspecies Galeosoma coronatum sphaeroideum Hewitt, 1919 was described based on a single female from Potchefstroom.

== Conservation ==
Galeosoma coronatum is listed as Data Deficient due to taxonomic reasons, as more sampling is needed to collect males and determine the species' full range. The species is suspected to be threatened by infrastructure development and human settlement around Kroonstad and Potchefstroom, but receives some protection in Borakalalo Game Reserve.

== Taxonomy ==
The species was originally described by John Hewitt in 1915 from Kroonstad in the Free State. The species has not been revised and remains known only from the female sex.
