= Hogna schreineri =

Schreiner's burrow-living wolf spider

Scientific classification
- Kingdom: Animalia
- Phylum: Arthropoda
- Subphylum: Chelicerata
- Class: Arachnida
- Order: Araneae
- Infraorder: Araneomorphae
- Family: Lycosidae
- Genus: Hogna
- Species: H. schreineri

Binomial name
- Hogna schreineri (Purcell, 1903)

Synonyms
- Lycosa schreineri Purcell, 1903

Species of spider

Hogna schreineri is a species of spider in the family Lycosidae. It is found in southern Africa and is commonly known as Schreiner's burrow-living wolf spider.

== Distribution ==
Hogna schreineri is found in Namibia and South Africa. In South Africa, it is recorded from Limpopo and the Northern Cape provinces.

== Habitat and ecology ==
This species is a ground dweller that lives in open burrows. It has been sampled from the Grassland and Savanna biomes at altitudes ranging from 1011 to 1358 m.

== Description ==
Hogna schreineri is known from both sexes.

The carapace is brown with dark, whitish hairy stripes, weak wavy ends, whitish hairy submarginal bands, and an equally hairy narrow median band.

The abdomen is dorsally blackish with a broad light yellowish central field running almost to the rear end, bordered by a blackish, black-trimmed median trapezoid in front and black square spots at the back. On each side are two large blackish spots. Ventrally, the sternum and coxae are black. The chelicerae are blackish and frontally yellowish hairy.

== Conservation ==
The species has a large geographic range and is protected in Benfontein Game Reserve, Rooipoort Nature Reserve, and Lekgalameetse Nature Reserve.

== Etymology ==
The species is named after S.C. Cronwright Schreiner, who collected specimens at Hanover in the Cape Colony.

== Taxonomy ==
The species was originally described by Purcell in 1903 as Lycosa schreineri from Farm Palmietfontein in Hanover, Northern Cape. It was later revised by Roewer in 1960.
