= Galeosoma vandami =

Limpopo Shield-Bum Trapdoor Spider

Conservation status
- Least Concern (SANBI Red List)

Scientific classification
- Kingdom: Animalia
- Phylum: Arthropoda
- Subphylum: Chelicerata
- Class: Arachnida
- Order: Araneae
- Infraorder: Mygalomorphae
- Family: Idiopidae
- Genus: Galeosoma
- Species: G. vandami

Binomial name
- Galeosoma vandami Hewitt, 1915

Species of spider

Galeosoma vandami is a species of spider in the family Idiopidae. It is endemic to South Africa and is commonly known as the Limpopo shield-bum trapdoor spider.

== Distribution ==
Galeosoma vandami is recorded from several localities in Limpopo Province. Notable locations include Blouberg Nature Reserve, Gravelotte, Leydsdorp (the type locality at Griffin Mine), Soutpansberg Conservancy, and several sites within Kruger National Park including Shingwedzi, Vutomi, and Satara.

== Habitat and ecology ==
The species constructs silk-lined burrows in soil with the entrance closed by a wafer-type trapdoor. It inhabits the Savanna biome at altitudes ranging from 282 to 944 m above sea level.

== Description ==
Galeosoma vandami is known from both sexes. The upper surface of the abdominal shield is almost regularly oval in outline. It is lightly convex behind and more strongly so anteriorly, with a distinct ridge which in the posterior third is sharp and slightly upturned, but in the anterior half is less prominent, although even here the upper and marginal surfaces are angularly inclined to each other. The upper surface carries only a few long hairs, but they are numerous on the marginal surface.

== Subspecies ==
A subspecies Galeosoma vandami circumjunctum Hewitt, 1919 is known from N'Wanedzi River in the Zoutpansberg district. It is listed under G. vandami until more data become available. This subspecies differs from the typical form in that the upper surface of the shield is devoid of long hairs, though numerous very fine short hairs are present. Sometimes four pairs of stiff setae are present.

== Conservation ==
Galeosoma vandami is listed as Least Concern due to its wide geographic range within Limpopo Province. There are no significant threats to the species, and it is protected in Blouberg Nature Reserve and Kruger National Park.

== Taxonomy ==
The species was originally described by John Hewitt in 1915 from Griffin Mine, Leydsdorp in Limpopo Province. The species has not been revised.
