= Dutch Reformed Church, Hanover =

Church in Hanover, South Africa

Dutch Reformed Church
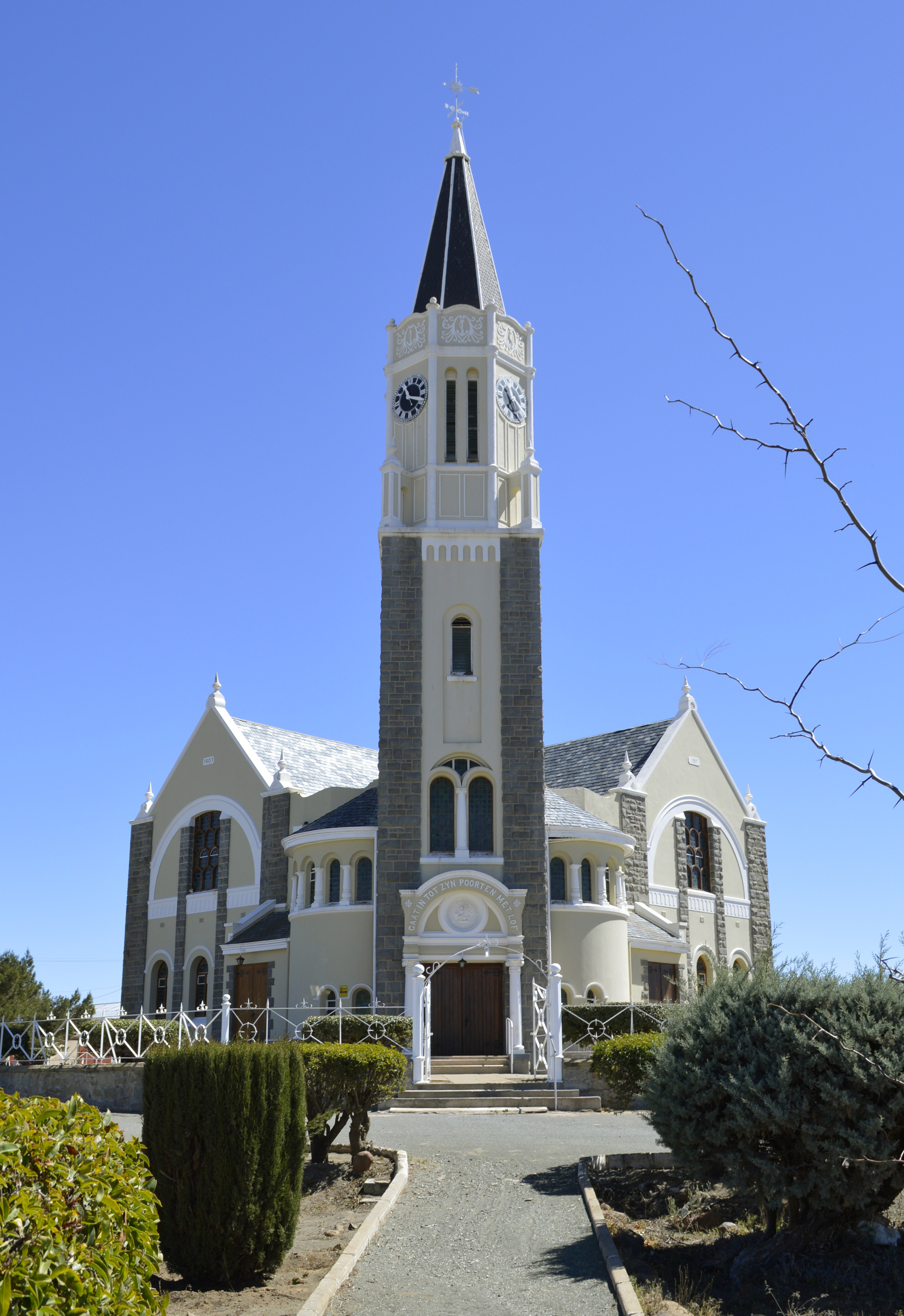
- Location: Hanover
- Country: South Africa
- Denomination: Nederduits Gereformeerde Kerk

History
- Founded: 1856

Architecture
- Functional status: Church

The Dutch Reformed Church in Hanover is a congregation of Dutch Reformed Church in the Karoo town of Hanover, exactly halfway between Cape Town and Johannesburg. From the national road the traveller can see the church tower clearly outlined between two hills. This remarkable church, designed by the Australian-born William Henry Ford, was erected in 1907 during the ministry of the Rev. S.P. Fouché at a cost of £8 530.

== Foundation ==
The congregation was founded in 1856 and the first pastor was Rev. Thomas François Burgers, the later president of the Transvaal Republic. He stood here until 1872 when he retired from the ministry. In the parsonage garden there is still a tall cypress tree that he planted at the grave of his child who died here. During the last years of his stay here, part of the congregation seceded as a result of the case of Burgers against the Synod. De Kerkbode of 3 July 1869 reported on this: “Door de gemeente, welche zich aan de dienst van Rev. Burgers heeft onttrokken, is tot haren leeraar beroepen de Proponent C. du Toit, die het beroepen, vememen wy, heeft aangenomen." He was ordained as pastor on 13 November 1869, and on the occasion Rev. A.A. Louw van Murraysburg, grandfather of Rev. J.S. Louw, who was confirmed here in 1949, delivered the confirmation speech. In 1874 he left the congregation again. At the Synod of 1873 it was decided to recognise the free congregation of Hanover as a separate congregation of the Dutch Reformed Church, but the congregation was advised to seek a speedy reunion with the original congregation.

During the ministry of Rev. (later Prof.) J.I. Marais, who was called by the original congregation from Cape Town and confirmed on 15 September 1873, this schism was reconciled, and the unity of the congregation was restored, especially through the mediation of a commission delegated by the Presbytery of Graaff-Reinet.

== Sources ==
- (in Afrikaans) (in English) Hofmeyr, W. Lou(w); Hofmeyr, Nico J.; Hofmeyr, S.M.; Hofmeyr, George S.; Hofmeyr, Johannes W. (samestellers). 1987. Die Hofmeyrs: 'n Familiegeskiedenis. Lynnwoodrif en Bloemfontein: Die Samestellers.
- (in Afrikaans) Smit, ds. A.P. 1956. Eeufeesalbum Hanover. 'n Oorsig van die geskiedenis van die Ned. Geref. gemeente, asook een en ander oor die dorp en distrik, 1856–1956. Hanover, NG Kerkraad.
- (in Afrikaans) Craven, Danie en Jordaan, Piet. 1955. Met die Maties op die rugbyveld 1880–1955. Kaapstad, Bloemfontein, Johannesburg: Nasionale Boekhandel Beperk.
- (in Afrikaans) Olivier, ds. P.L.. 1952. Ons gemeentelike feesalbum. Kaapstad en Pretoria: N.G. Kerk-uitgewers.
