= Voorspoed diamond mine =

Diamond mind in South Africa

Coordinates: 27°24′S 27°12′E

Voorspoed mine
- Interactive map of Voorspoed mine
- Location: Kroonstad (Moqhaka), Free State, South Africa
- Products: diamond
- Opened: 2008
- Closed: 2018 (operations ceased)
- Company: De Beers

The Voorspoed mine is one of the largest diamond mines in South Africa and in the world. The mine is located in the center of the country in Kroonstad, about 30 kilometres north-east of Kroonstad in Free State. The mine has estimated reserves of 10 million carats of diamonds and an annual production capacity of 800,000 carats.

== Geology ==
Voorspoed is a kimberlite-hosted diamond deposit, part of the Kroonstad Kimberlite Cluster and characterised as a Group II kimberlite (orangeite) pipe. There are atypical features compared with other South African kimberlite pipes and significant post-emplacement erosion and deep exposure relative to the original land surface.

The country rocks at Voorspoed as predominantly Permian sedimentary rocks of the Ecca Group (including the Volksrust and Vryheid formations) within the Karoo Supergroup, with dolerite sills intruding parts of the sequence

== Early 1900s ==
The mine was mined from 1906 until 1912 by the Voorspoed Diamond Mining Company. Around 2 million tons were mined, producing 950,000 carats including occasional large and exotic color diamonds. VDMC experienced difficulties in mining the hard kimberlite and the mine was closed. It was acquired by De Beers (DBCM) in 1912. The marginal nature of the deposit and lack of technology to utilise the deposits meant that the mine was not exploited by DBCM until 2006. DBCM obtained a mining right for Voorspoed on 10 October 2006 (Mining Right number FS30/5/1/2/2/12MR). It was developed and operated as an open-pit kimberlite mine by DBCM, and was officially opened on 4 November 2008.

== Modern redevelopment ==
Following advances in processing technology, DBCM initiated a feasibility study in 2003 for an open-pit operation. The project construction cost was expected to be approximately R1.2 billion ( US$172 million) with an estimated life of 12 to16 years, producing eight to ten million carats during that time.

== Operations 2000s ==
The Voorspoed Mine was officially opened on 4 November 2008 by South Africa’s Minister of Minerals and Energy. It was expected that the mine would produce approximately 800,000 carats per year when in full production, and it reached 700,000 carats per year in actual production.

== Closure ==
In 2017, De Beers initiated a sale process for the mine, announcing that that a lower-cost operator might extend the operating life beyond 2020. However in 2018, after an unsuccessful disposal process, De Beers announced it would proceed with closure and rehabilitation of the mine. The last ore was processed in December 2018. At closure the ownership of the DBCM operation was De Beers plc (74% shareholding) and Ponahalo Investments (RF) Proprietary Limited (26%).
