= Galeosoma hirsutum =

Roodeplaat Shield-Bum Trapdoor Spider

Conservation status
- Endangered (SANBI Red List)

Scientific classification
- Kingdom: Animalia
- Phylum: Arthropoda
- Subphylum: Chelicerata
- Class: Arachnida
- Order: Araneae
- Infraorder: Mygalomorphae
- Family: Idiopidae
- Genus: Galeosoma
- Species: G. hirsutum

Binomial name
- Galeosoma hirsutum Hewitt, 1916

Species of spider

Galeosoma hirsutum is a species of spider in the family Idiopidae. It is endemic to South Africa and is commonly known as the Roodeplaat shield-bum trapdoor spider.

== Distribution ==
Galeosoma hirsutum is recorded from several localities in Gauteng Province, including Johannesburg, Pretoria, Roodeplaat, Groenkloof Nature Reserve, and other areas around the Pretoria metropolitan region.

== Habitat and ecology ==
The species constructs silk-lined burrows in soil with the entrance closed by a wafer-type trapdoor. It inhabits the Grassland biome at altitudes ranging from 1,127 to 1,601 m above sea level.

== Description ==
Galeosoma hirsutum is known only from females. The upper surface of the opisthosoma shield is decidedly convex with an oval outline. The posterior upper edge of the shield is fairly well-defined but not as strongly acute as in G. pallidum. The distinction between upper and marginal surfaces is well maintained all around, but the edge in front is not well marked. The marginal surface is deepest anteriorly and shallowest posteriorly, and is coarsely pitted. The shield is densely bearded throughout, more strongly so than in G. pallidum.

== Conservation ==
Galeosoma hirsutum is listed as Endangered due to its restricted range and ongoing threats from urban development throughout its distribution. The species is currently known from fewer than five extant locations and is threatened by urban development. Only subpopulations occurring within nature reserves are safe from development pressure.

== Taxonomy ==
The species was originally described by John Hewitt in 1916 from Roodeplaat in Gauteng Province. The species has not been revised and remains known only from the female sex.
