= Galeosoma schreineri =

Scientific classification
- Kingdom: Animalia
- Phylum: Arthropoda
- Subphylum: Chelicerata
- Class: Arachnida
- Order: Araneae
- Infraorder: Mygalomorphae
- Family: Idiopidae
- Genus: Galeosoma
- Species: G. schreineri

Binomial name
- Galeosoma schreineri Hewitt, 1913

Species of spider

Galeosoma schreineri is a species of spider in the family Idiopidae. It is endemic to South Africa.

== Distribution ==
Galeosoma schreineri is recorded only from its type locality at De Aar in the Northern Cape Province.

== Habitat and ecology ==
The species constructs silk-lined burrows in soil with the entrance closed by a wafer-type trapdoor. It inhabits the Nama Karoo biome at an altitude of 1,242 m above sea level.

== Description ==
Galeosoma schreineri is known only from females. The carapace, appendages and soft portions of the abdomen are pale brown, with a darker olive tinge that forms a more or less regular reticulation on the posterior half and sides of the carapace, and inconspicuous narrow bands along the upper surfaces of the legs. The dorsal shield is a thick, broadly oval or subcircular plate occupying the posterior part of the abdominal surface above. The shield has a convex upper surface with a slightly raised and clearly defined edge. The raised edge is especially marked in young specimens. Anteriorly, where the marginal surface is obtusely inclined to the upper surface, the thickness is about 2.5 mm, but posteriorly, where the two surfaces are acutely inclined to each other, the thickness is only about 1.6 mm. The upper and marginal surfaces of the shield are coarsely punctate and hairy, with the hairs around the upper edge forming a loose fringe.

== Conservation ==
Galeosoma schreineri is listed as Data Deficient due to taxonomic reasons, as more sampling is needed to collect males and determine the species' range. Threats to the species are unknown.

== Taxonomy ==
The species was originally described by John Hewitt in 1913 from De Aar in the Northern Cape Province. The species has not been revised and remains known only from the female sex.
