= Galeosoma robertsi =

Robert's Shield-Bum Trapdoor Spider

Conservation status
- Vulnerable (SANBI Red List)

Scientific classification
- Kingdom: Animalia
- Phylum: Arthropoda
- Subphylum: Chelicerata
- Class: Arachnida
- Order: Araneae
- Infraorder: Mygalomorphae
- Family: Idiopidae
- Genus: Galeosoma
- Species: G. robertsi

Binomial name
- Galeosoma robertsi Hewitt, 1916

Species of spider

Galeosoma robertsi is a species of spider in the family Idiopidae. It is endemic to South Africa and is commonly known as Robert's shield-bum trapdoor spider.

== Distribution ==
Galeosoma robertsi is recorded from two South African provinces: Gauteng and North West. In Gauteng, it is found in Pretoria and surrounding areas including Mayville, Wonderboompoort, New Muckleneuk, Brooklyn, Garstfontein, and the Onderstepoort Nature Reserve. In North West, it occurs near Potchefstroom and Venterskroon.

== Habitat and ecology ==
The species constructs silk-lined burrows in soil with the entrance closed by a wafer-type trapdoor. It inhabits the Grassland biome at altitudes ranging from 1,209 to 1,603 m above sea level.

== Description ==
Galeosoma robertsi is known only from females. The upper surface of the abdominal shield is very strongly convex but less curved in a longitudinal line. On a transverse vertical section, the upper surface would show an almost semicircular outline. When viewed from above, the upper surface is broadly oval. The surface has coarse punctuations which cover the whole of the upper surface, and a ridge is present posteriorly.

== Conservation ==
Galeosoma robertsi is listed as Vulnerable due to its restricted range and ongoing habitat loss. This range-restricted endemic has lost a number of its historic locations to urban development, with ongoing loss of habitat to development. The species is currently recorded from between five and ten extant locations and receives protection in the Onderstepoort Nature Reserve.

== Taxonomy ==
The species was originally described by John Hewitt in 1916 from Pretoria in Gauteng Province based on numerous specimens all collected prior to 1916. The species has not been revised and remains known only from the female sex.
