= Galeosoma crinitum =

Scientific classification
- Kingdom: Animalia
- Phylum: Arthropoda
- Subphylum: Chelicerata
- Class: Arachnida
- Order: Araneae
- Infraorder: Mygalomorphae
- Family: Idiopidae
- Genus: Galeosoma
- Species: G. crinitum

Binomial name
- Galeosoma crinitum Hewitt, 1919

Species of spider

Galeosoma crinitum is a species of spider in the family Idiopidae. It is endemic to South Africa.

== Distribution ==
Galeosoma crinitum is recorded only from Potchefstroom in the North West Province.

== Habitat and ecology ==
The species constructs silk-lined burrows in soil with the entrance closed by a wafer-type trapdoor. It inhabits the Grassland biome at an altitude of 1,349 m above sea level.

== Description ==
Galeosoma crinitum is known only from females. The upper surface of the shield is broadly oval and strongly curved from side to side, but less so from front to back. The marginal surface is deepest in front and most reduced laterally, with a marginal ridge in the posterior half of the shield. The secondary marginal surface is not continued anteriorly. The shield bears long hairs rather sparsely distributed on the upper surface.

== Conservation ==
Galeosoma crinitum is listed as Data Deficient due to taxonomic reasons, as too little is known about the distribution and threats to this taxon for an assessment to be made. The placement of the male is also problematic.

== Taxonomy ==
The species was originally described by John Hewitt in 1919 as a variety of G. robertsi from Venterskroon, but was later elevated to species level in 1935. The species has not been revised.
