= Galeosoma pallidum =

Saltpan Shield-Bum Trapdoor Spider

Conservation status
- Endangered (SANBI Red List)

Scientific classification
- Kingdom: Animalia
- Phylum: Arthropoda
- Subphylum: Chelicerata
- Class: Arachnida
- Order: Araneae
- Infraorder: Mygalomorphae
- Family: Idiopidae
- Genus: Galeosoma
- Species: G. pallidum

Binomial name
- Galeosoma pallidum Hewitt, 1916

Species of spider

Galeosoma pallidum is a species of spider in the family Idiopidae. It is endemic to South Africa and is commonly known as the Saltpan shield-bum trapdoor spider.

== Distribution ==
Galeosoma pallidum is recorded only from localities in Gauteng Province, including Alewynspoort, Pretoria, Saltpan, Groenkloof Nature Reserve, Centurion, Garstfontein, and other areas around the Pretoria metropolitan region.

== Habitat and ecology ==
The species constructs silk-lined burrows in soil with the entrance closed by a wafer-type trapdoor. It inhabits the Grassland biome at altitudes ranging from 1,246 to 1,650 m above sea level.

== Description ==
Galeosoma pallidum is known from both sexes. Females have a carapace, pedipalps and legs that are pale yellowish in colour, with brown chelicerae and a black opisthosoma shield. The dorsal shield forms a thick disk with a sharply defined flat upper surface and a fairly deep marginal surface inclined at right angles to each other. The junction between the two surfaces forms a slightly upturned ridge. Anteriorly, the upper and marginal surfaces become more obtusely inclined to each other and their junction becomes ill-defined. Total length is approximately 21 mm.

== Conservation ==
Galeosoma pallidum is listed as Endangered due to its restricted range and ongoing threats from urban development. The species is currently known from fewer than five extant locations and is threatened throughout its range by urban development. It receives some protection in Groenkloof Nature Reserve.

== Taxonomy ==
The species was originally described by John Hewitt in 1916 from Saltpan in Gauteng Province. The species has not been revised.
