= Galeosoma pluripunctatum =

Scientific classification
- Kingdom: Animalia
- Phylum: Arthropoda
- Subphylum: Chelicerata
- Class: Arachnida
- Order: Araneae
- Infraorder: Mygalomorphae
- Family: Idiopidae
- Genus: Galeosoma
- Species: G. pluripunctatum

Binomial name
- Galeosoma pluripunctatum Hewitt, 1919

Species of spider

Galeosoma pluripunctatum is a species of spider in the family Idiopidae. It is endemic to South Africa.

== Distribution ==
Galeosoma pluripunctatum is recorded only from its type locality at Mooivlei, Rustenburg in the North West Province.

== Habitat and ecology ==
The species constructs silk-lined burrows in soil with the entrance closed by a wafer-type trapdoor. It inhabits the Savanna biome at an altitude of 1,171 m above sea level.

== Description ==
Galeosoma pluripunctatum is known only from females. The species is closely related to G. schreineri and G. vandami and may be regarded as a connecting link between those two species. The upper surface of the abdominal shield is closely and finely pitted, which constitutes the most distinguishing character of the species. The surface is devoid of long stiff hairs or bristles except for a pair in the anterior half. Except for the punctures, the surface is smooth and glossy. The marginal ridge between the upper and lateral surfaces posteriorly is sharp and slightly upturned, while anteriorly it is practically obsolete as a distinct ridge.

== Conservation ==
Galeosoma pluripunctatum is listed as Data Deficient due to taxonomic reasons, as more sampling is needed to collect males and determine the species' range. Threats to the species are unknown.

== Taxonomy ==
The species was originally described by John Hewitt in 1919 from Mooivlei, Rustenburg in the North West Province. The species has not been revised and remains known only from the female sex.
