= Galeosoma scutatum =

Round Shield-Bum Trapdoor Spider

Conservation status
- Endangered (SANBI Red List)

Scientific classification
- Kingdom: Animalia
- Phylum: Arthropoda
- Subphylum: Chelicerata
- Class: Arachnida
- Order: Araneae
- Infraorder: Mygalomorphae
- Family: Idiopidae
- Genus: Galeosoma
- Species: G. scutatum

Binomial name
- Galeosoma scutatum Purcell, 1903

Species of spider

Galeosoma scutatum is a species of spider in the family Idiopidae. It is endemic to South Africa and is commonly known as the round shield-bum trapdoor spider. This is the type species of the genus Galeosoma.

== Distribution ==
Galeosoma scutatum is recorded from three South African provinces: the Free State, Gauteng, and North West. Notable locations include Kommandonek in the Free State, Luipaardsvlei and the Mogale Game Reserve in Gauteng, and Skeerpoort in North West.

== Habitat and ecology ==
The species constructs silk-lined burrows in soil with the entrance closed by a wafer-type trapdoor. It inhabits the Grassland and Savanna biomes at altitudes ranging from 1,231 to 1,728 m above sea level.

== Description ==
Galeosoma scutatum is known only from females. The dorsal abdominal shield is regularly oval when seen from above. Its lower edge is convex in outline when seen from the side and quite entire both behind and in front, with the posterior margin thickened. The surface of the shield is coarsely punctate, shiny, and glabrous except at the margin, which is hairy.

== Conservation ==
Galeosoma scutatum is listed as Endangered due to its restricted range and ongoing threats. This range-restricted species is threatened by ongoing loss of habitat to urban development and crop cultivation. The majority of historical collection sites have likely been lost to urban development. The species is partly protected in the Mogale Game Reserve.

== Taxonomy ==
The species was originally described by W. F. Purcell in 1903 from Luipaardsvlei in Gauteng Province, making it the type species of the genus Galeosoma. The species has not been revised and remains known only from the female sex.
