= Bloemhoek Dam =

- Interactive map of Bloemhoek Dam
- Official name: Bloemhoek Dam
- Location: Free State, South Africa
- Coordinates: 27°38′1″S 27°17′0″E
- Opening date: 1976
- Operators: Department of Water Affairs and Forestry

Dam and spillways
- Type of dam: earth-fill
- Impounds: Jordaan Spruit
- Height: 26 m
- Length: 1251 m

Reservoir
- Creates: Bloemhoek Dam Reservoir
- Total capacity: 26 400 m3
- Surface area: 370 ha

Bloemhoek Dam, is an earth-fill type dam located on a small river called Jordaan Spruit close to Kroonstad, Free State, province South Africa. It is part of the Vals River System. The Serfontein Dam, which is almost completely silted-up, releases water directly into the Vals River from where it is pumped into the Bloemhoek Dam, for supply to the urban area of Kroonstad. Its main purpose is for municipal and industrial use.

== See also ==
- List of reservoirs and dams in South Africa
- List of rivers of South Africa
