= Kulu Ferreira =

South African rugby union footballer

- Born: Petrus Stephanus Ferreira; 17 March 1959 (age 67) Kroonstad, Free State
- Height: 1.94 m (6 ft 4 in)
- Weight: 98 kg (216 lb)
- School: Afrikaans Hoër Kroonstad
- University: Stellenbosch University

Rugby union career
- Position: Flanker
Provincial / State sides
Years	Team	Apps	(Points)
1981–1985	Western Province	56	
1986–1991	Northern Free State		
International career
Years	Team	Apps	(Points)
1984	South Africa	2	(4)

Petrus Stephanus 'Kulu' Ferreira (born 17 March 1959) is a South African former rugby union player.

== Playing career ==
Ferreira grew up in Kroonstad in the Free State. He represented the Northern Free State schools team at the annual Craven Week tournament in 1976 and in 1977, when he also captained the side. After school he enrolled at Stellenbosch University where he played for the University's different age–group teams. Ferreira made his senior provincial debut for Western Province in 1981 and played for the union until 1985. In September 1985, Ferreira moved to France, where he played for the rugby club in Marmande. He returned to South Africa and the Northern Free State in the middle of 1986, where he continued his rugby career.

Ferreira made his debut for the Springboks on 20 October 1984 against the South American Jaguars at Loftus Versveld in Pretoria. He also played in the second test against the South Americans and scored a try.

=== Test history ===
No.	Opponents	Results (RSA 1st)	Position	Tries	Dates	Venue
1.	South American Jaguars	32–15	Flanker		20 Oct 1984	Loftus Versfeld, Pretoria
2.	South American Jaguars	22–13	Flanker	1	27 Oct 1984	Newlands, Cape Town

== See also ==
- List of South Africa national rugby union players – Springbok no. 540
