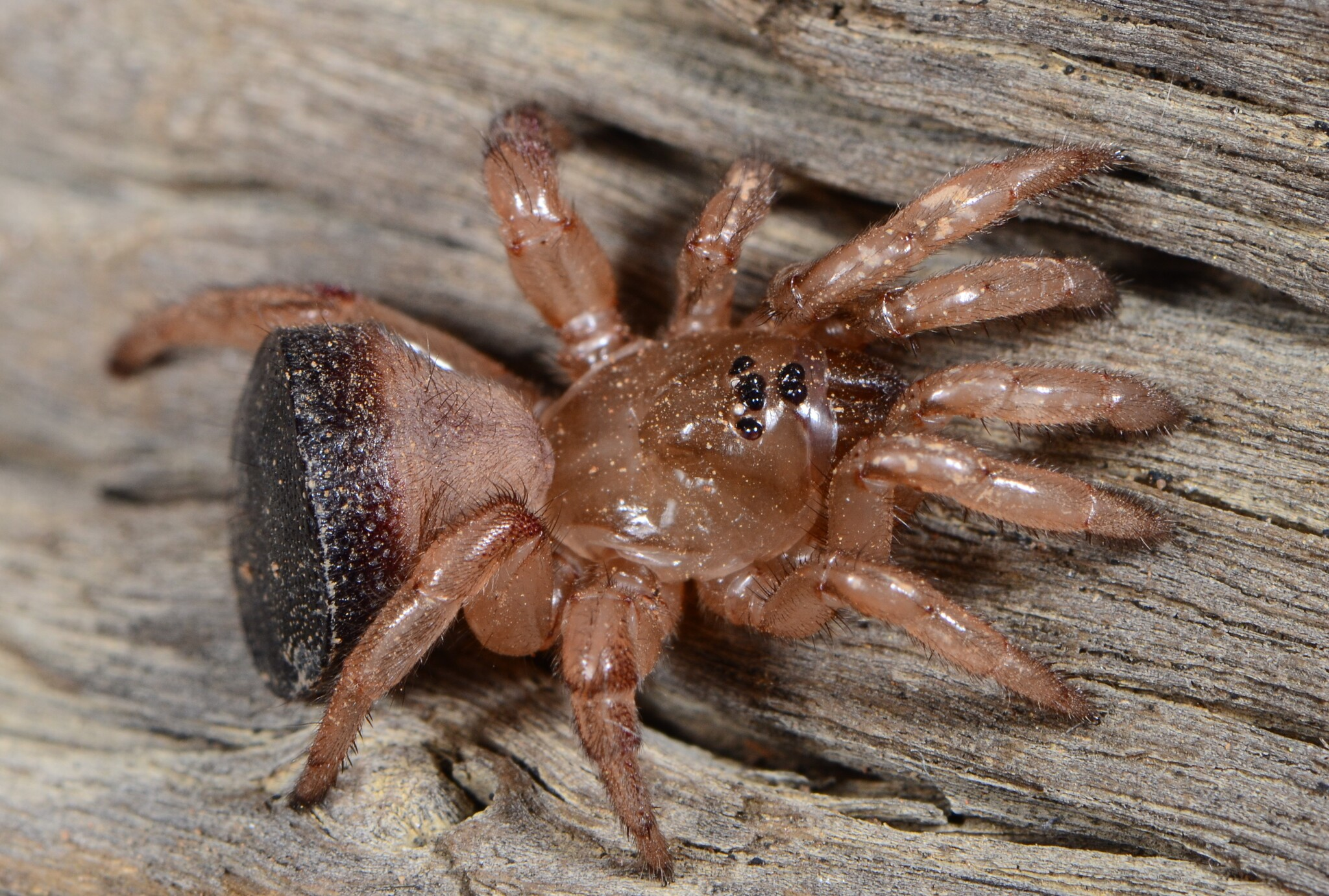
- Female G. planiscutatum
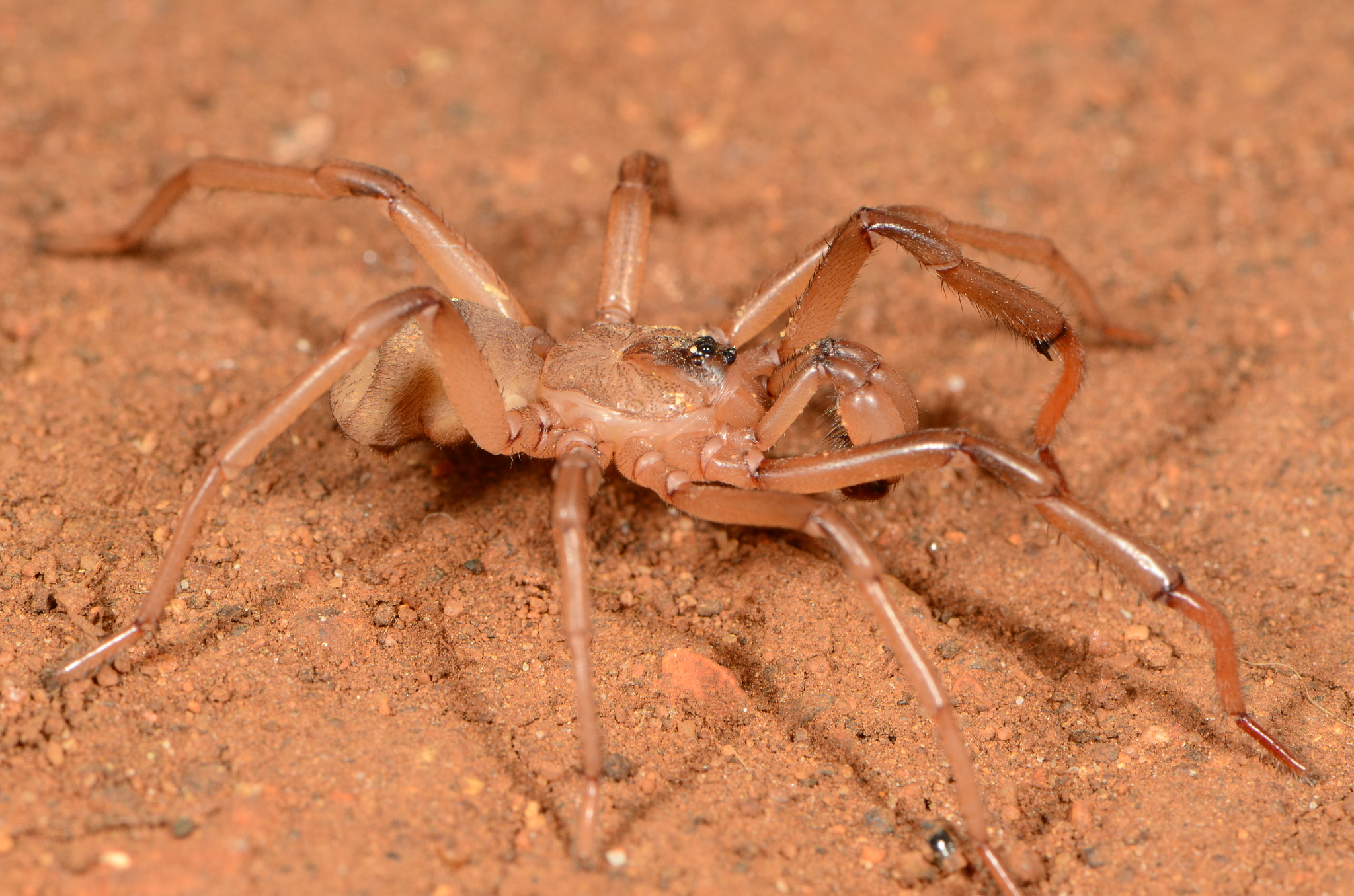
- Male G. planiscutatum

Scientific classification
- Kingdom: Animalia
- Phylum: Arthropoda
- Subphylum: Chelicerata
- Class: Arachnida
- Order: Araneae
- Infraorder: Mygalomorphae
- Family: Idiopidae
- Genus: Galeosoma; Purcell, 1903

Type species
- G. scutatum Purcell, 1903

Species
- 12, see text

= Galeosoma =

Genus of spiders

Galeosoma is a genus of African armored trapdoor spiders that was first described by William Frederick Purcell in 1903.

== Life style ==
Galeosoma uses the hardened posterior part of their abdomen as a false bottom to close and protect the lower part of the burrow while a thin wafer-like lid is usually positioned slightly above the ground. The burrow descends vertically downwards expanding below into one or two chambers. The spider uses the wider portions of the burrow as turning chambers while the shield on the abdomen closely fits within the narrow passage.

== Description ==
Females measure 16 to 21 mm in body size while males have a shield width of 8 to 11 mm.

The upper part of the female abdomen has cuticula that is very thick, hard and inflexible, forming a symmetrical oval piece of armor encasing the dorsal and upper surface, completely covering the spinnerets from above. The underside is soft skinned.

The cheliceral furrow has one row of teeth. The labium and endites have few cuspules. Two pairs of small sigilla are situated close to the sternal edge. The coxae III lack cuspules.

== Taxonomy ==
The form of the shield of any species, though very constant in adult specimens collected in one locality, may vary considerably according to the maturity of the individual and eventually it may be found impossible to distinguish between the various species except in the fully adult stages.

Three species are listed as Endangered and one as Vulnerable, while four are Data Deficient. Only two species are known from both sexes.

== Species ==
As of September 2025, this genus includes twelve species and three subspecies:

- Galeosoma coronatum Hewitt, 1915 – South Africa
  - G. c. sphaeroideum Hewitt, 1919 – South Africa
- Galeosoma crinitum Hewitt, 1919 – South Africa
- Galeosoma hirsutum Hewitt, 1916 – South Africa
- Galeosoma mossambicum Hewitt, 1919 – Mozambique
- Galeosoma pallidum Hewitt, 1915 – South Africa
  - G. p. pilosum Hewitt, 1916 – South Africa
- Galeosoma planiscutatum Hewitt, 1919 – South Africa
- Galeosoma pluripunctatum Hewitt, 1919 – South Africa
- Galeosoma robertsi Hewitt, 1916 – South Africa
- Galeosoma schreineri Hewitt, 1913 – South Africa
- Galeosoma scutatum Purcell, 1903 – South Africa (type species)
- Galeosoma vandami Hewitt, 1915 – South Africa
  - G. v. circumjunctum Hewitt, 1919 – South Africa
- Galeosoma vernayi Hewitt, 1935 – Botswana
