= Angela de Jesus =

South African artist (born 1982)

- Born: 1982 (age 43–44); Kroonstad
- Known for: Video art
- Awards: Sasol New Signatures (merit winner); Xposure Award (merit winner); Spier Contemporary 2010 Thamdigi Foundation Residency Prize

Angela de Jesus is a South African visual artist and curator living and working in Bloemfontein.

== Background ==
de Jesus uses her Portuguese heritage and experience working in a takeaway shop to investigate intercultural exchange and visual perception. She uses hidden CCTV cameras as materials in her own video creations.

== Career ==
=== Education ===
- MFA from the University of the Free State

=== Exhibitions ===
- Sasol New Signatures Competition at the Pretoria Art Museum
- Absa L’Atelier, ABSA Gallery, Johannesburg
- Bellville Gallery, Cape Town
- Oliewenhuis Art Museum
- Spier Contemporary 2010 - winner of Thamdigi Foundation Prize in Arnhem, Netherlands

== Notable works ==
=== Control Room ===
Video installation, size variable
