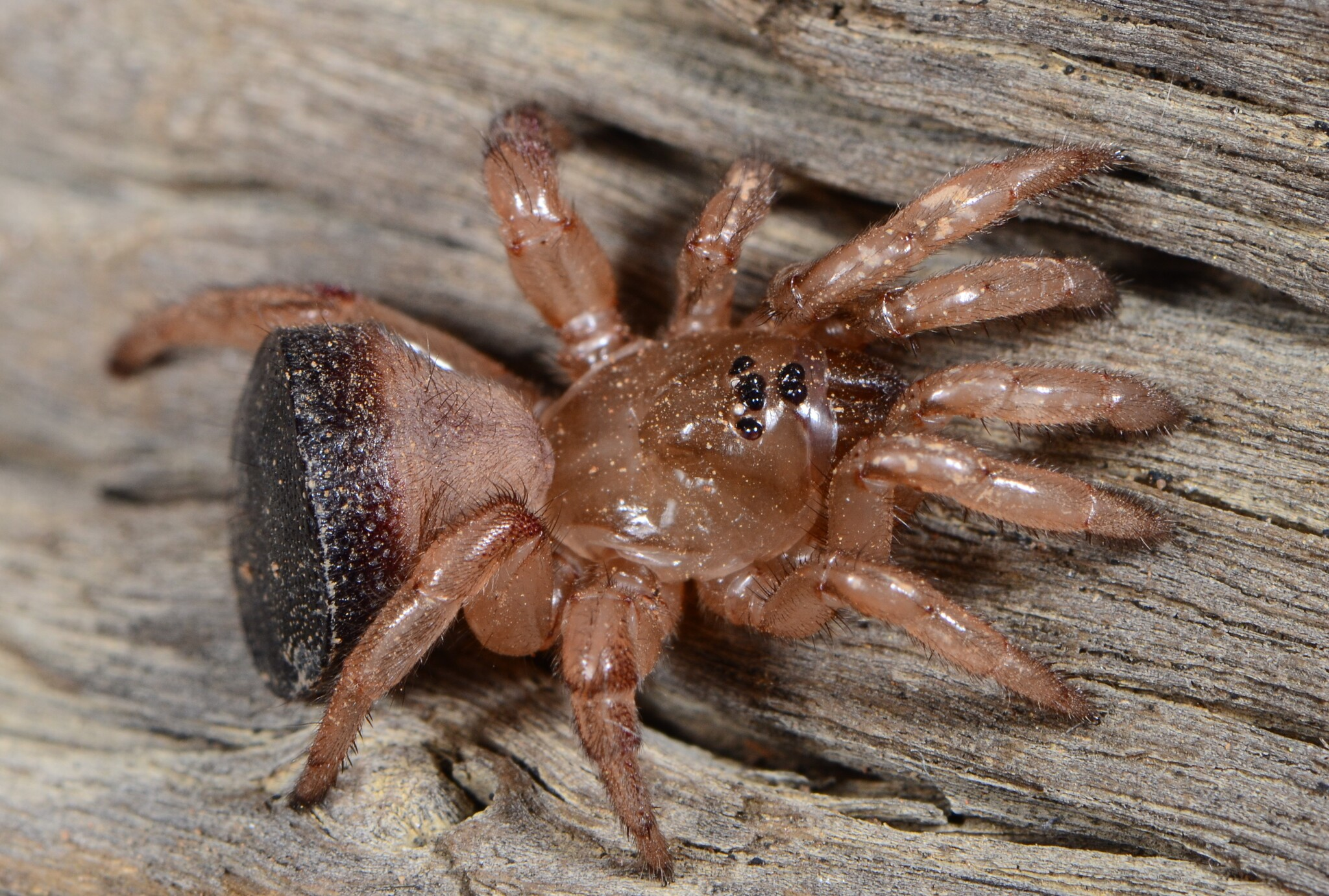
- Adult female from Lephalale, South Africa
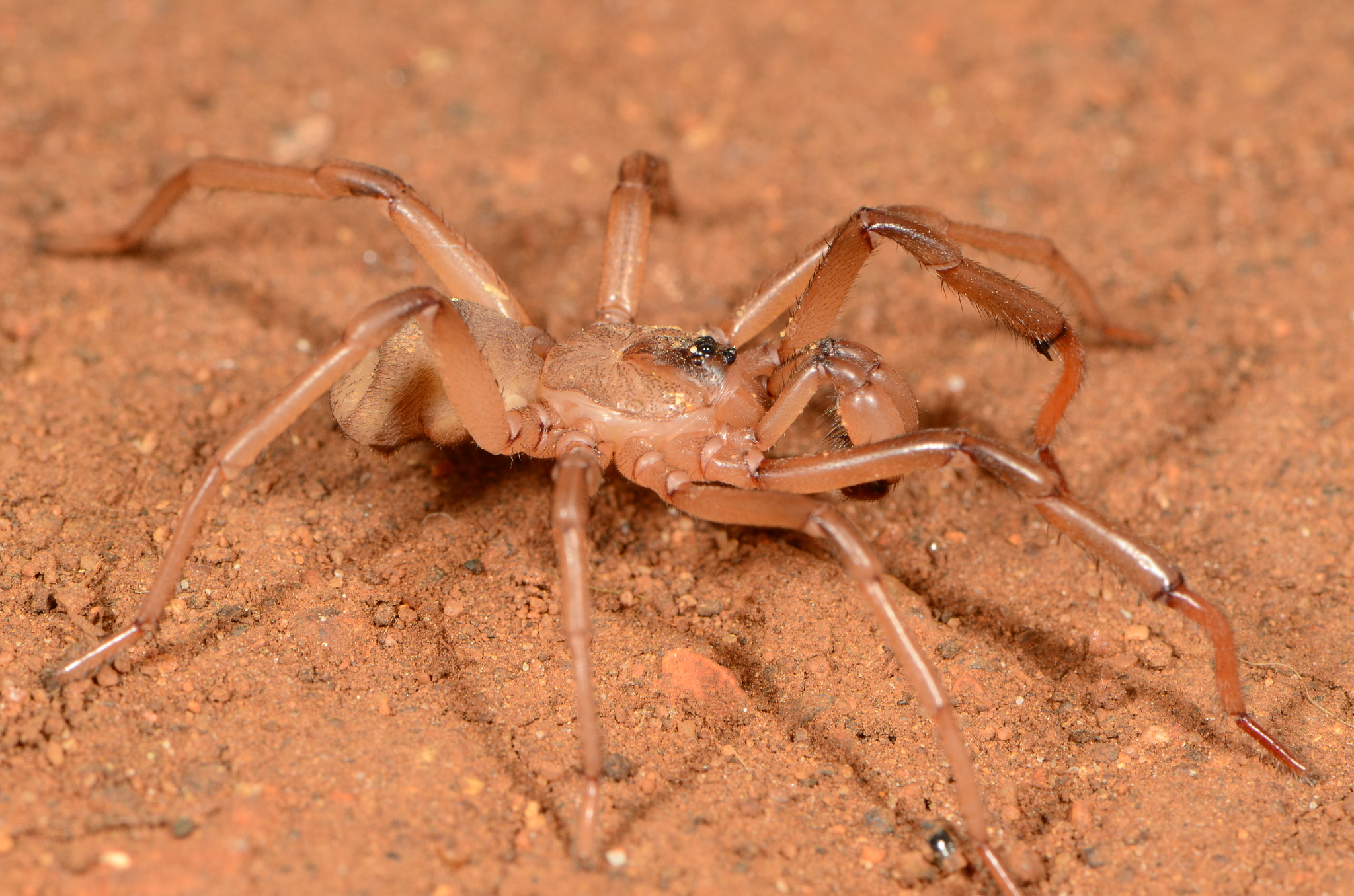
- Adult male

Scientific classification
- Kingdom: Animalia
- Phylum: Arthropoda
- Subphylum: Chelicerata
- Class: Arachnida
- Order: Araneae
- Infraorder: Mygalomorphae
- Family: Idiopidae
- Genus: Galeosoma
- Species: G. planiscutatum

Binomial name
- Galeosoma planiscutatum Hewitt, 1919

= Galeosoma planiscutatum =

Buffelsdraai Shield-Bum Trapdoor Spider

Species of spider

Galeosoma planiscutatum is a species of spider in the family Idiopidae. It is endemic to South Africa and is commonly known as the Buffelsdraai shield-bum trapdoor spider.

== Distribution ==
Galeosoma planiscutatum is recorded from three South African provinces: Gauteng, Limpopo, and North West. Notable locations include Groenkloof Nature Reserve in Gauteng, Kruger National Park in Limpopo, and Buffelsdraai in North West.

== Habitat and ecology ==
The species constructs silk-lined burrows in soil with the entrance closed by a wafer-type trapdoor. It inhabits the Grassland and Savanna biomes at altitudes ranging from 315 to 1,722 m above sea level.

== Description ==
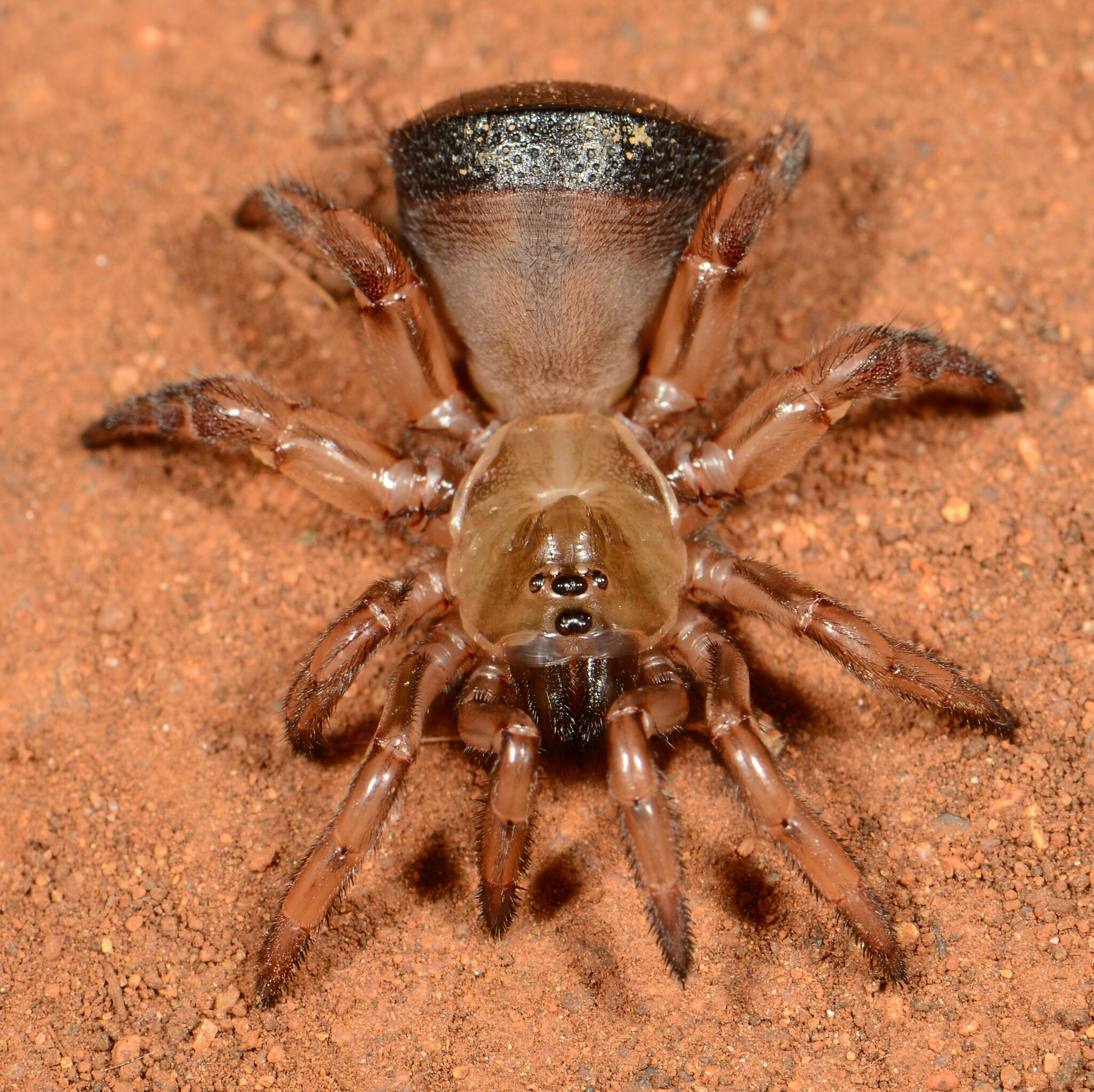
female

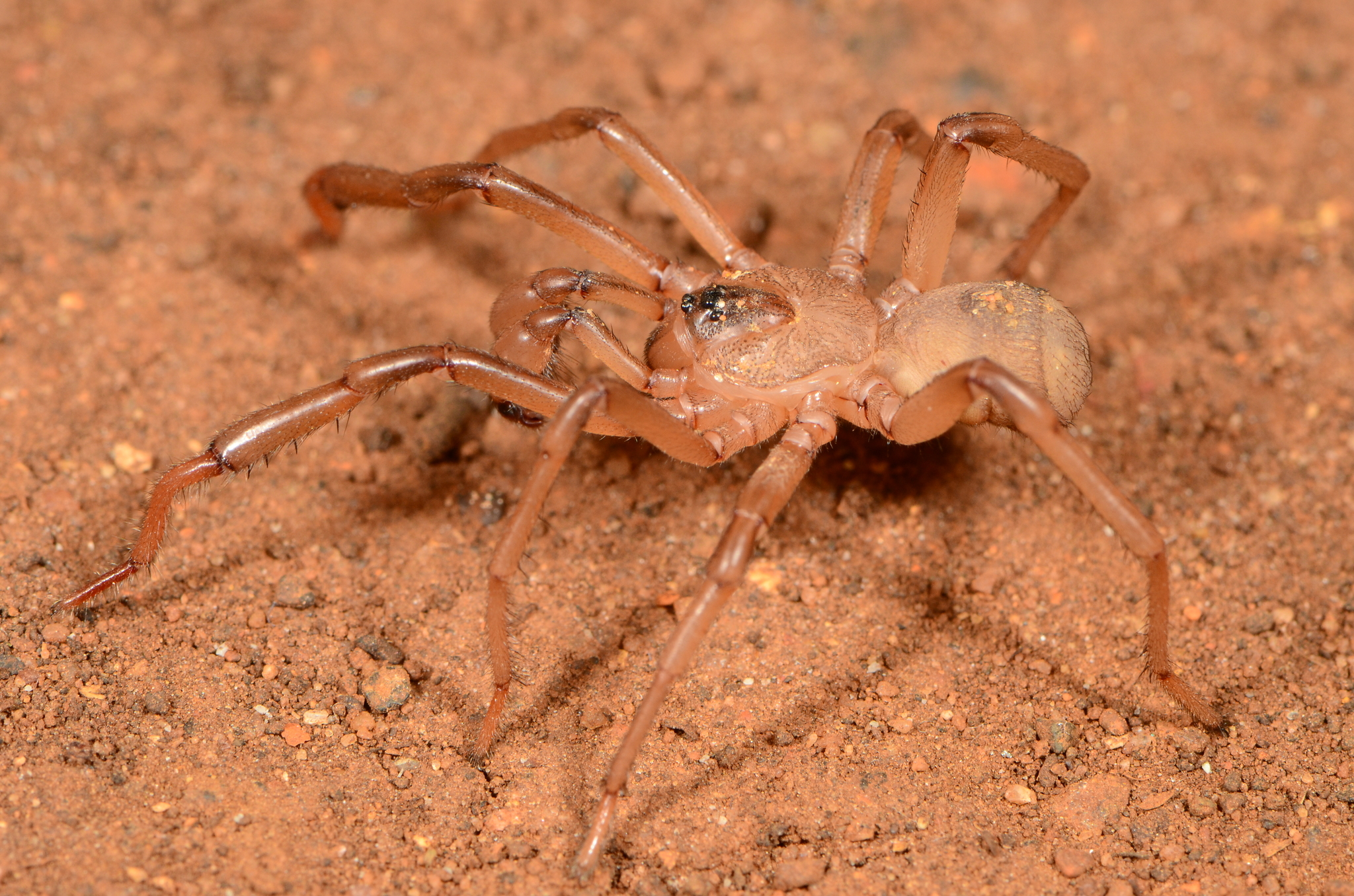
male

Galeosoma planiscutatum is described only from females. The abdominal shield is oval and flat with a well-defined, upturned ridge all around. The surface is shallowly pitted.

== Conservation ==
Galeosoma planiscutatum is listed as Least Concern due to its sufficiently widespread distribution across three provinces. However, the species is threatened by urban development in the Gauteng portion of its range, and more sampling is needed to collect males and determine the species' abundance between Gauteng and Kruger National Park.

== Taxonomy ==
The species was originally described by John Hewitt in 1919 from Buffelsdraai in the North West Province. The species has not been revised and remains known only from the female sex.
