= Dutch Reformed Church, Kroonstad =

Church in Kroonstad, South Africa

Coordinates: 27°40′0.72″S 27°14′3.10″E

Dutch Reformed Church
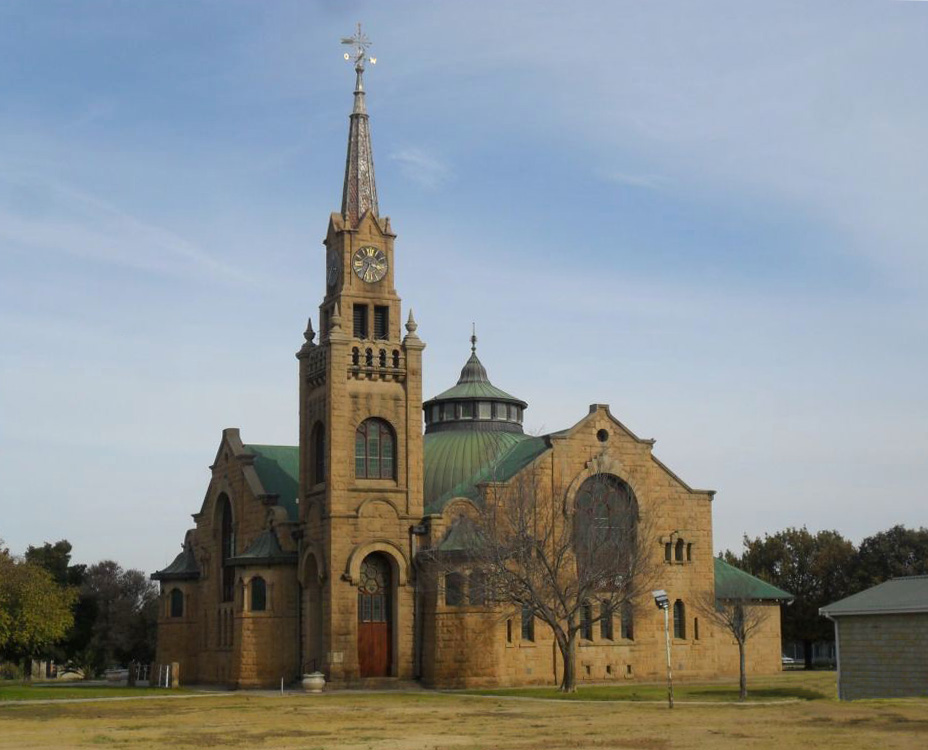
- Dutch Reformed Church
- Location: Kroonstad
- Country: South Africa
- Denomination: Nederduits Gereformeerde Kerk

History
- Founded: 1860

Architecture
- Functional status: Church

The Dutch Reformed Church in Kroonstad is the mother congregation of the Dutch Reformed Church in the Free State town of Kroonstad. It is the eighth oldest congregation in the Free State Synod.

== Background ==
The town of Kroonstad was founded around 1857. Kroonstad was named after a horse, called Kroon, owned by the well-known Voortrekker Sarel Cilliers. The horse was injured in the Kroonspruit. According to the oldest residents of the town, who told the contributor to Ons gemeentelike feesalbum around 1910, it was the original plan to lay out a town on Kroonspruit at Kroondrif.

According to the custom of those days, when measuring the farms, every 50th farm was allocated to the government. Thus, the farm Kroont belonged to the government as the 50th farm. But the inhabitant of Klipplaatdrif, David Benjamin Jordaan, exchanged farms with the government, because his farms would then lie next to each other and not be separated by state land. Thus, part of Klipplaatdrif thus became state land and the town of Kroonstad was founded there on the Vals River.

There is also an opinion that Kroonstad was named after the strong fortress of the name in Russia. Originally the area was part of the Dutch Reformed congregation of Harrismith. From time to time services and church council meetings were held at Kleinfontein, Doornkop and Kransdrif, in the Valsrivier ward of the Harrismith congregation. This took place in the years 1852 to 1854.
