= Kroonstad =

- Town
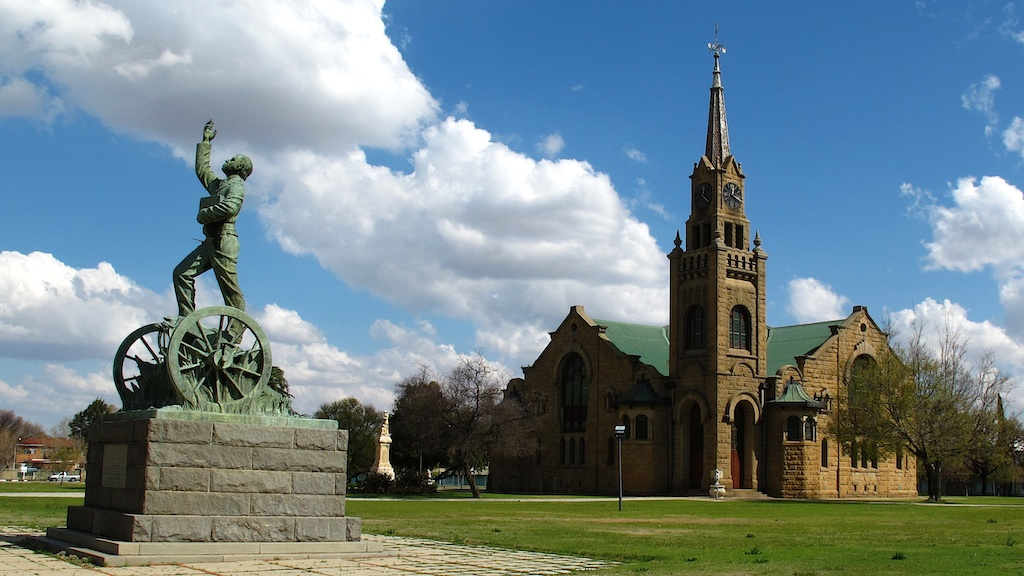
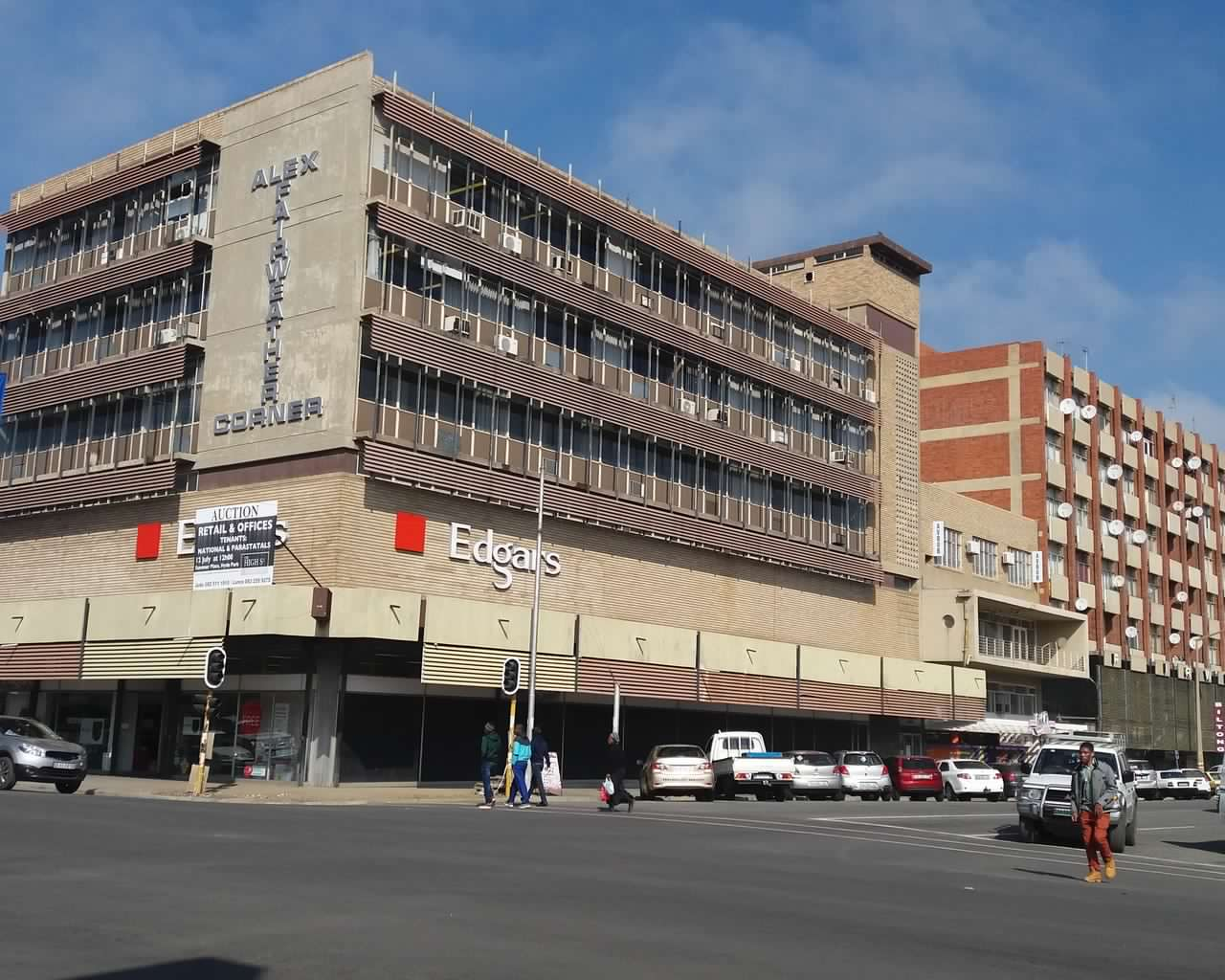
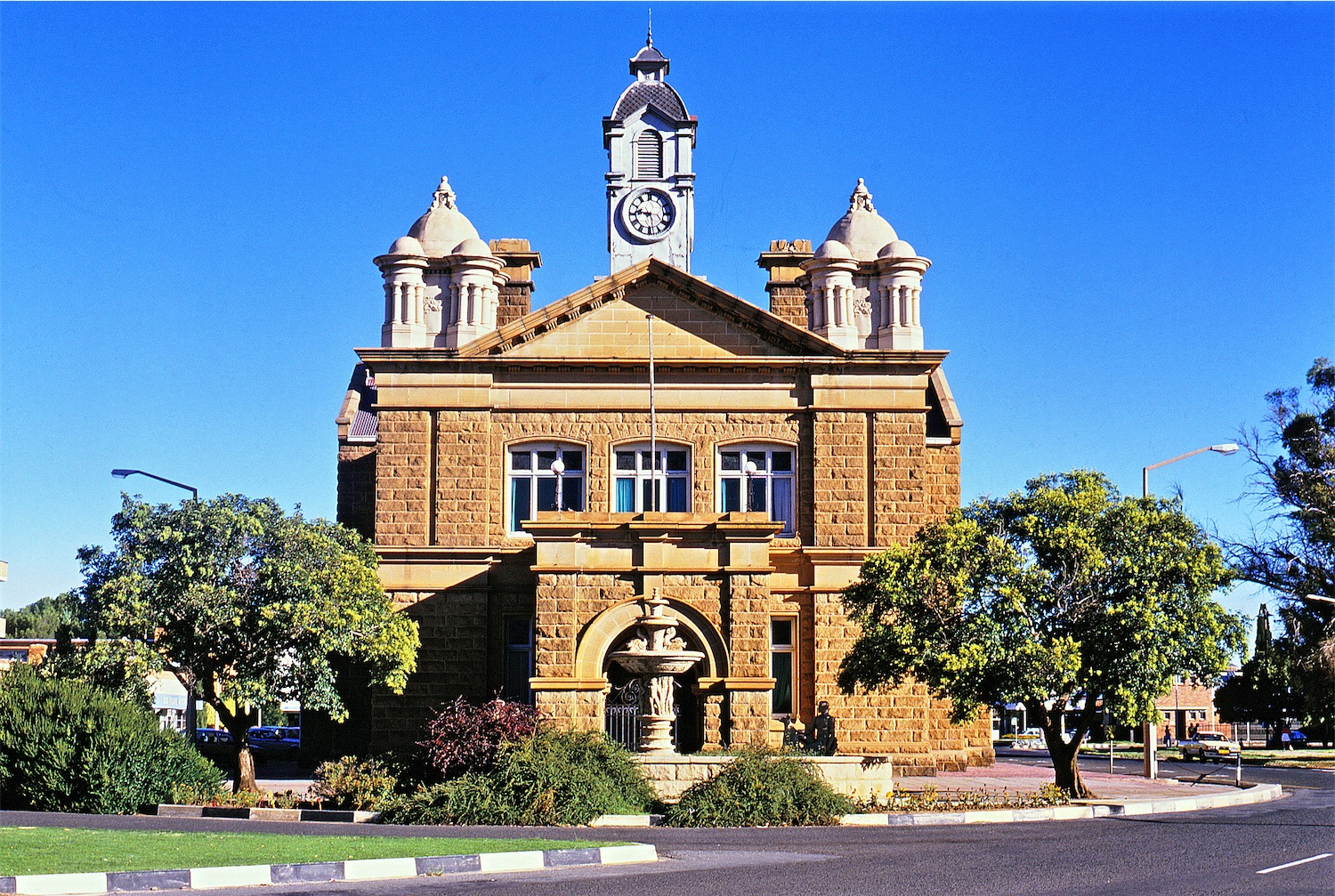
- Clockwise from top: Kroonstad NG Motherchurch & Sarel Cilliers monument, Town Hall, Alex Fairweather corner in the CBD
- Motto(s): Finis Corona Opus (Latin: The End of the Crown Work)
- Location within Free State (South African province) Location within South Africa Location within Africa
- Coordinates: 27°39′S 27°14′E
- Country: South Africa
- Province: Free State
- District: Fezile Dabi
- Municipality: Moqhaka
- Established: 1854

Area
  - Total: 89.1 km^{2} (34.4 sq mi)

Population (2011)
  - Total: 24,723
  - Density: 277/km^{2} (719/sq mi)

Racial makeup (2011)
  - Black African: 45.4%
  - Coloured: 13.7%
  - Indian/Asian: 1.1%
  - White: 39.1%
  - Other: 0.7%

First languages (2011)
  - Sotho: 25.0%
  - Afrikaans: 62.1%
  - English: 5.3%
  - Xhosa: 2.1%
  - Other: 5.5%
- Time zone: UTC+2 (SAST)
- Postal code (street): 9499
- PO box: 9500
- Area code: 056

Kroonstad (lit. 'Crown City' in Afrikaans) is a town on the N1 highway in Free State, South Africa. It is the fourth largest town in the Free State (after Bloemfontein, Welkom and Bethlehem). It is the second-largest commercial and urban centre in the Northern Free State (after Welkom), and an important railway junction on the main line from Cape Town to Johannesburg.

In the 2011 census, the town of Kroonstad proper recorded a population of 24,723 residents. Of these, 45.4% identified as Black African, 39.1% as White, 13.7% as Coloured, and 1.1% as Indian/Asian. The most common first language in the town is Afrikaans, spoken by 62.9% of the population, followed by Sotho at 25.0% and English at 5.3%. When the data from the neighboring township of Maokeng is added, the total population of the Kroonstad area rises to 97,780, with Sotho becoming the primary first language.

== History ==
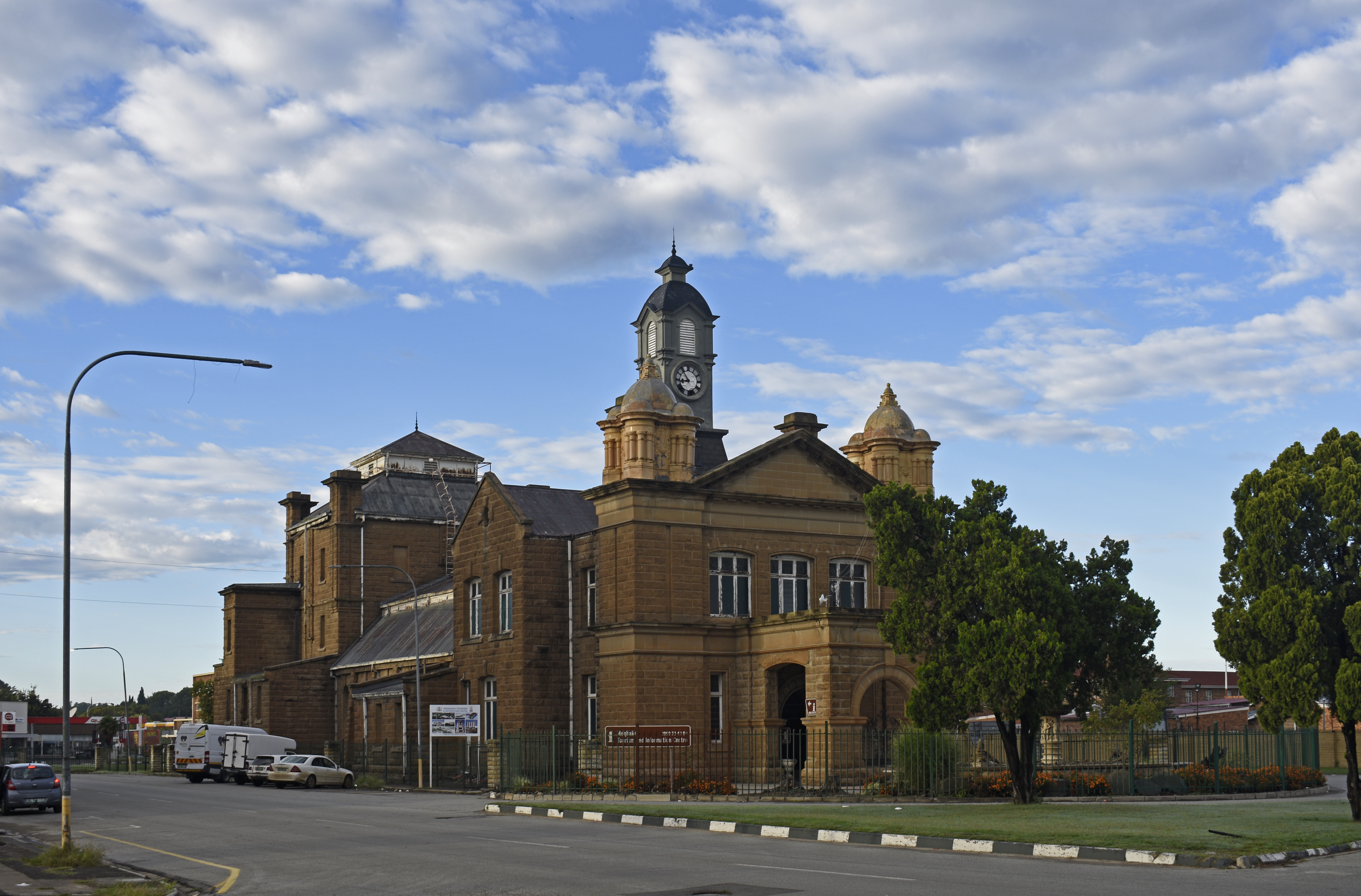
Kroonstad Old Town Hall

Kroonstad was established in 1855 by the Irish pioneer Joseph Orpen, and was the first town founded after the independence of the Orange Free State. It was chosen as the capital of the state, a dignity it held from the March 13 to May 11 1900. On the following day the town was occupied by Lord Roberts. The linking of the town in 1906 with the Colony of Natal made the route via Kroonstad the shortest railway connection between Cape Town and Durban.

While Kroon means "crown", this was in fact the name of a horse that had drowned in the nearby ford. A lover of animals, Orpen had witnessed the incident, and named the infant settlement in honour of the unfortunate creature. Similarly, the ford in question came to be known as Kroondrift.

During the Second Boer War, from 13 March to 11 May 1900, the city became the capital of the Orange Free State, and subsequently the site of a concentration camp to contain Boer women and children.

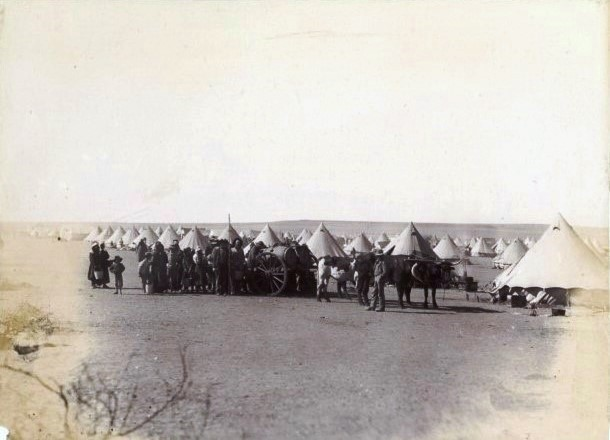
The British concentration camp of Kroonstad for Whites.

== Economy ==
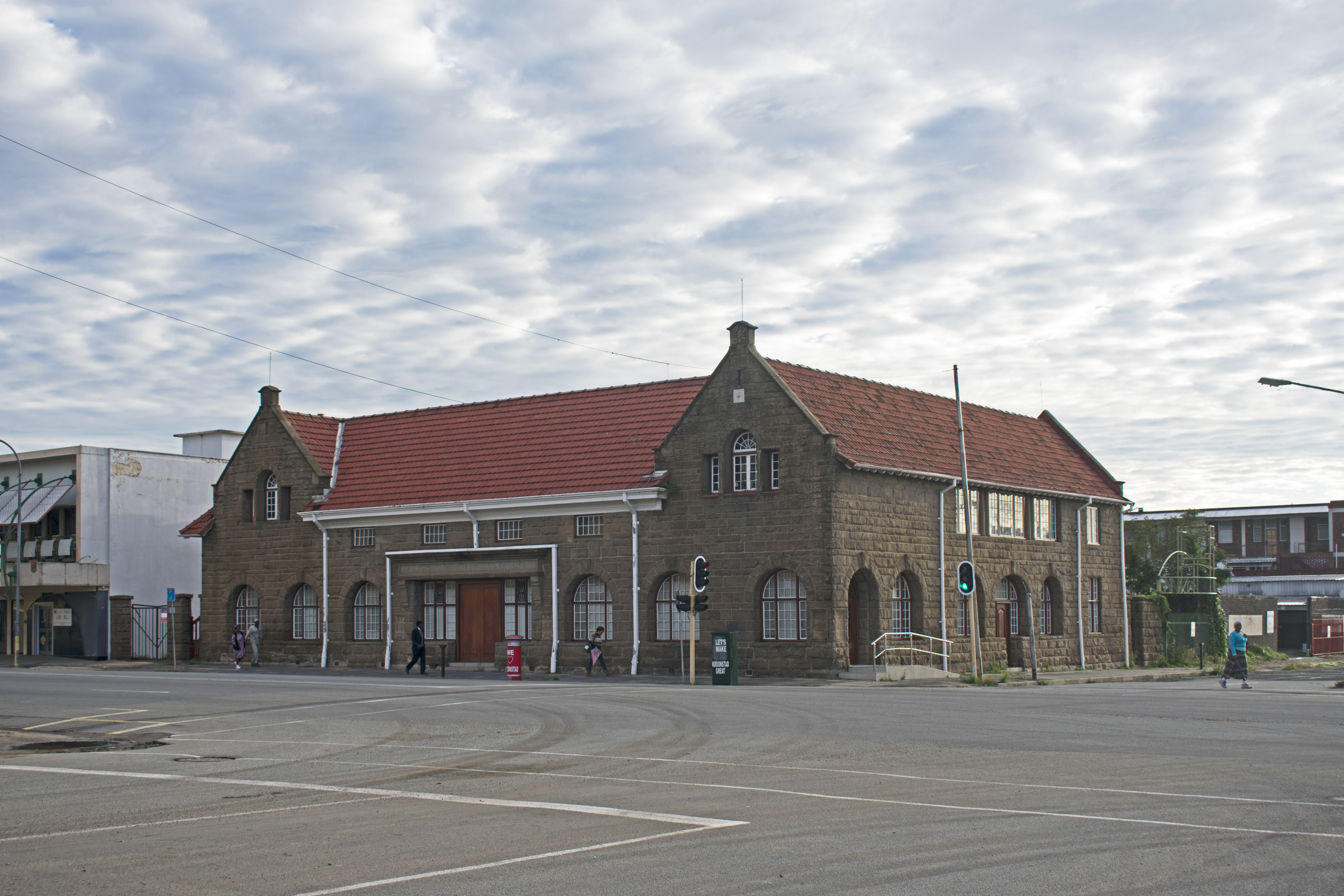
A bank building in the center of Kroonstad

The main industry of Kroonstad is agriculture. It is the centre of a rich agricultural district, producing maize, wheat, dairy and meat products and wool. The Bloemhoek Dam lies just east of the town and supplies much of its water needs. A caravan park and many more camp sites on the banks of the willow-lined Vals River (Afrikaans: Valsrivier) are frequented by anglers and watersport enthusiasts.

== Leisure ==
Leisure opportunities are plentiful in Kroonstad, where visitors can enjoy golf on the 18-hole course in the town, lion tours and interaction with lion and tiger cubs at the Boskoppie Lion and Tiger Park, fishing in the well stocked Vals River or on the Bloemhoek Dam, and boating on the Serfontein Dam. Horseriding, gliding and hiking trails are also available.

== Transport ==
=== Road ===
Kroonstad lies directly on the N1, which bypasses the town centre to the east (to Johannesburg in the north and Bloemfontein in the south). Other regional roads in the town are the R34 to Odendaalsrus in the south-west and Heilbron in the east, the R76 to Steynsrus in the south-east and Viljoenskroon in the north-west, the R721 to Vredefort in the north-west and the R82 to Sasolburg in the north-east.

=== Rail ===
Kroonstad railway station serves the town and is located on the important railway junction from Cape Town to Johannesburg via Bloemfontein.

On 4 January 2018, a passenger train, operated by Shosholoza Meyl, collided with a truck on a level crossing near Kroonstad/Hennenman. The train was derailed, and at least one of the carriages caught fire. Twenty people were killed and 260 were injured.

=== Air ===
Kroonstad is served by a small airport with no passenger flights.

== Shopping ==
Shopping in Kroonstad is characterised by typical high street shopping. The development of the new Kroonstad Water Front Mall is underway, Maokeng Mall, Panorama Plaza, Checkers Centre, Shoprite Centre, Ultra City Centre and Pick n Pay centre.

== General attractions ==
Kroonstad is located in the Free State and lies on the banks of the Vals River, a tributary of the Vaal, approximately halfway between Johannesburg and Bloemfontein.

There are facilities for sports including jukskei, an Afrikaner folk sport. The headquarters of the SA Jukskei Council has been established here since 1951. The city is rich in historical sights; several historic buildings and statues, a former concentration camp, the Sarel Cilliers Museum (although currently inactive) and other places of national interest can be found here. Kroonstad is an important agricultural service centre in the Free State with a predominantly agricultural-orientated economy served by a modern toll-road. This brings the PWV Region within two hours drive from Kroonstad as well as being accessible from the North West, Bloemfontein and the Eastern Free State.

In July 2022 Kroonstad was announced as the winner in the Kwêla Dorp Van Die Jaar competition.

== Historical sites ==
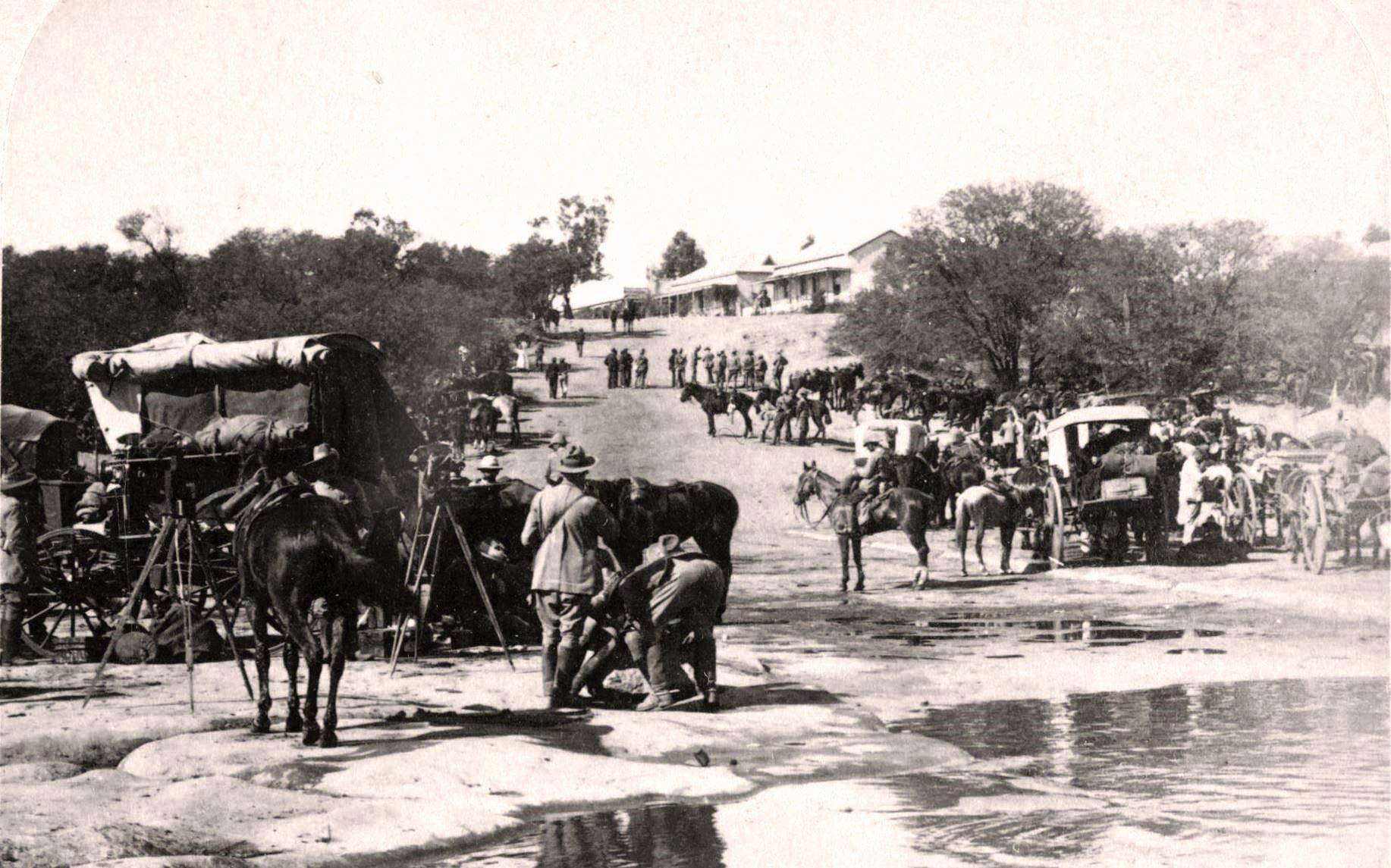
Correspondents await the arrival of Lord Roberts during the Second Boer War, 1901

The Bloemspruit Monument 27°40′18″S 27°12′23″E commemorates those who died in the Kroonstad Concentration Camp,

A Garden of Remembrance 27°39′05″S 27°14′19″E commemorates Allied soldiers fallen in the two World Wars.

A blockhouse south of the city is a reminder of later stages of the Second Boer War.

Stone corbelled huts, refuges for the prehistoric inhabitants of the region, occur in various locations about the city.

In addition, fossils and San rock art are present in the region.

== Notable people ==
- Sid James, actor
- Angela de Jesus, artist
- Steve Komphela, football coach
- Antjie Krog, poet
- Pallo Jordan, former ANC politician
- Fana Mokoena, actor & EFF politician
- Jeffrey Ntuka, football player
- Max du Preez, journalist
- Levy Sekgapane, operatic tenor
- Al J Venter, writer and journalist
- Mosiuoa Lekota, former ANC politician
- Winkie Direko, former ANC politician
- Robbie Wessels, singer
- Anton Goosen, singer
- Gert Smal, former Springbok rugby player and coach
- André Venter, former Springbok rugby player
- At Botha, actor and artist
- Faan Rautenbach, former Springbok rugby player
- Kulu Ferreira, former Springbok rugby player
- Burger Geldenhuys, former Springbok rugby player
- Michael Claassens, former Springbok rugby player
- Sarel Cilliers, preacher, Voortrekker leader, leader at Blood River
- Alwyn Schlebusch, politician, Vice President of South Africa 1981
- Herbert Kretzmer, lyricist for the English-language musical adaptation of Les Misérables

== Coat of arms ==
By 1931, the Kroonstad municipal council had assumed a coat of arms. It was registered with the Orange Free State Provincial Administration in February 1967 and at the Bureau of Heraldry in April 1971.

The arms were: Or, a tree on an island proper; on a chief Argent fimbriated Azure, a locomotive and tender Sable ("a golden shield displaying a tree on a grassy base, below a black locomotive and tender on a silver stripe across the top of the shield"). Originally, an imperial crown was placed above the shield, but it was replaced with a golden mural crown in the 1960s. The supporters were a black wildebeest and a blesbok, and the motto was Finis coronat opus.

== Sister cities ==
Kroonstad has two sister cities whose names are reminiscent of its own:

- – Brașov (German: Kronstadt), a city in Romania
- (Russia) – Kronstadt, a Russian seaport city west of Saint Petersburg

== See also ==
- Voorspoed diamond mine
