= Vals River =

Vals River Valsrivier
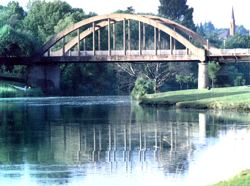
- Sarel Cilliers Bridge over the Vals River in Kroonstad

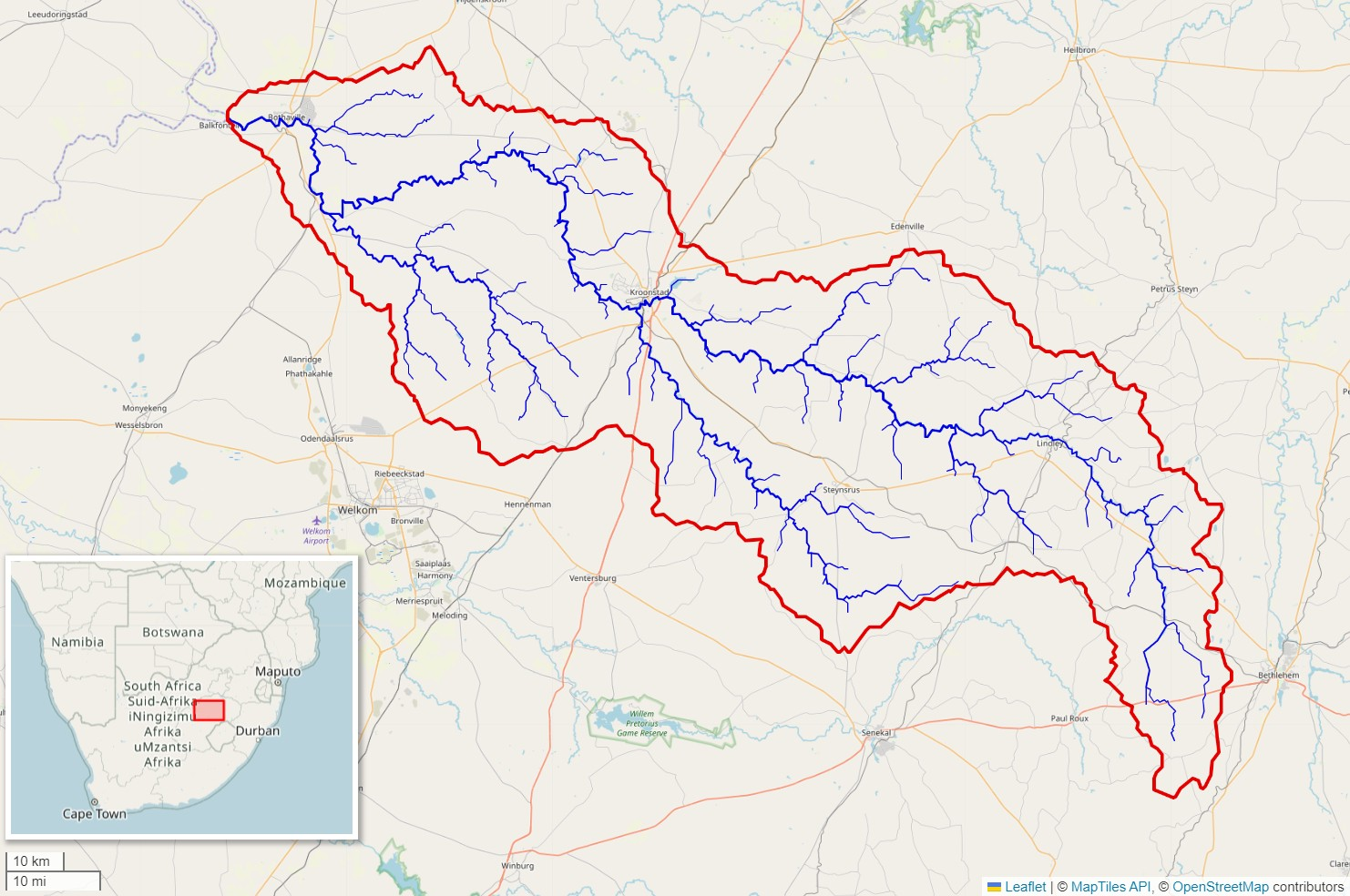
- Vals River watershed (Interactive map)
- Etymology: Translated into Afrikaans from its Khoekhoe name Enta, Nta or Entaap, meaning 'false or treacherous river'; possibly referring to unexpected depths in its stream bed or to changes in its course during floods.
- Native name: Enta (Khoekhoe)

Location
- Country: South Africa
- Region: Free State
- Cities: Lindley, Kroonstad

Physical characteristics
- Source
  - location: East of Paul Roux, West of Bethlehem, South Africa
  - coordinates: 28.29°S 28.21°E
  - elevation: 1,880 m (6,170 ft)
- Mouth: Vaal River
  - location: Confluence with the Vaal River near Balkfontein, South Africa
  - coordinates: 27.388°S 26.516°E
  - elevation: 1,250 m (4,100 ft)
- Basin size: 7,870 km^{2} (3,040 sq mi)

Basin features
- Tributaries
  - left: Blomspruit
  - right: Liebenbergstroom

The Vals River (Afrikaans: Valsrivier) is a tributary of the Vaal River in the Free State, South Africa. It is a strong seasonal river.

This river of the Middle Vaal System is a good place for fishing, especially the local Largemouth Yellowfish.

== Course ==
The river source is about 20 km southeast of Paul Roux and about 25 km southeast of Bethlehem. It flows under the N5 road shortly after its source. In its upper course the Vals River flows roughly northwards, bending northwestwards across the highveld towards Lindley and meandering across the plain.

In its middle course there are a number of weirs as it flows mostly through areas of dryland crops and its waters are used for irrigation. The Vals receives a number of small tributaries, the most important of which are the Blomspruit and the Liebenbergstroom. It finally meets the Vaal after crossing the city of Kroonstad.

== Dams in its basin ==
- Serfontein Dam, near Kroonstad
- Barend Wessel Dam, by Kroonstad
- Bloemhoek Dam, in the Jordaan Spruit

== See also ==
- List of rivers in South Africa
