= Hanover, South Africa =

Town in Northern Cape, South Africa

Hanover
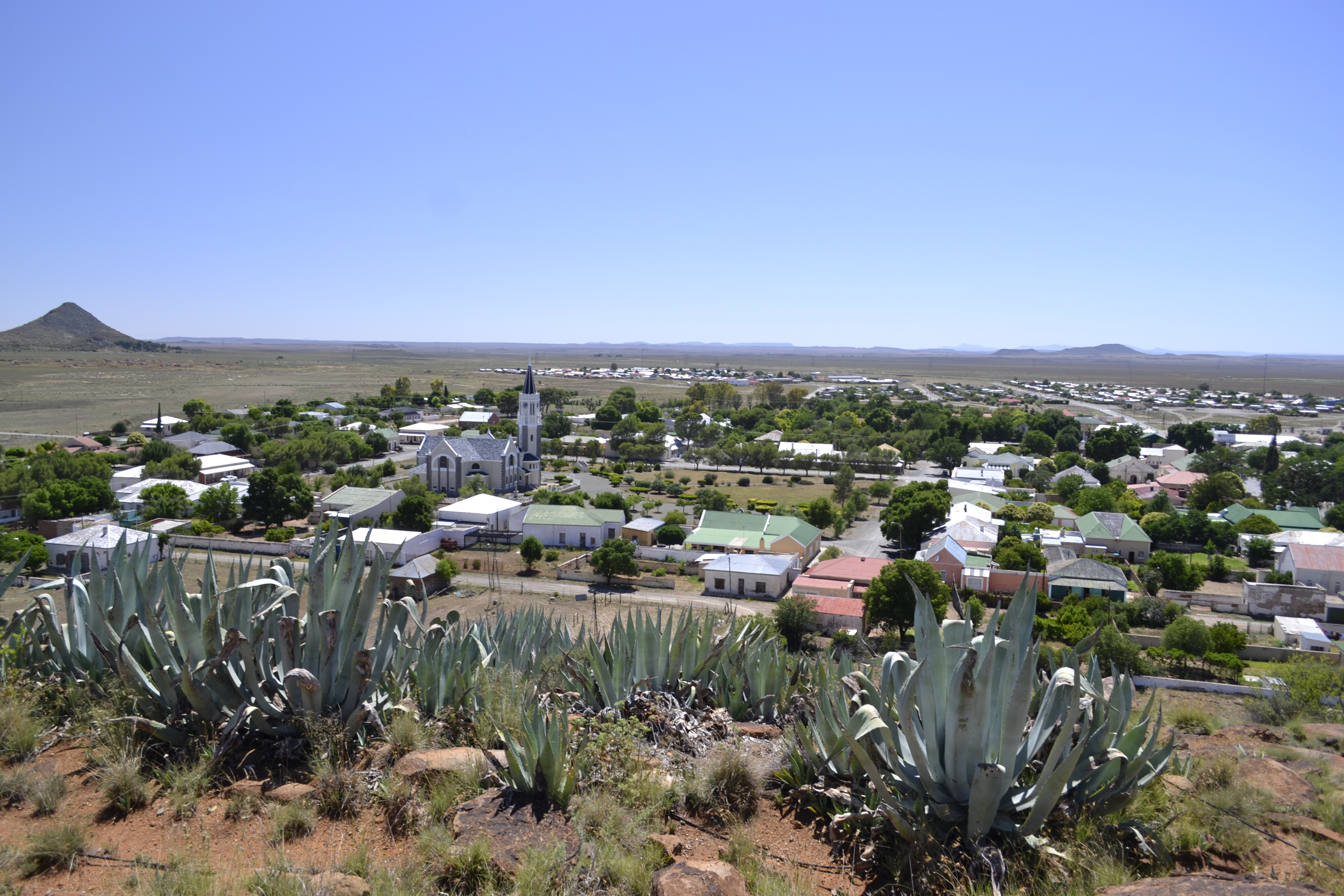
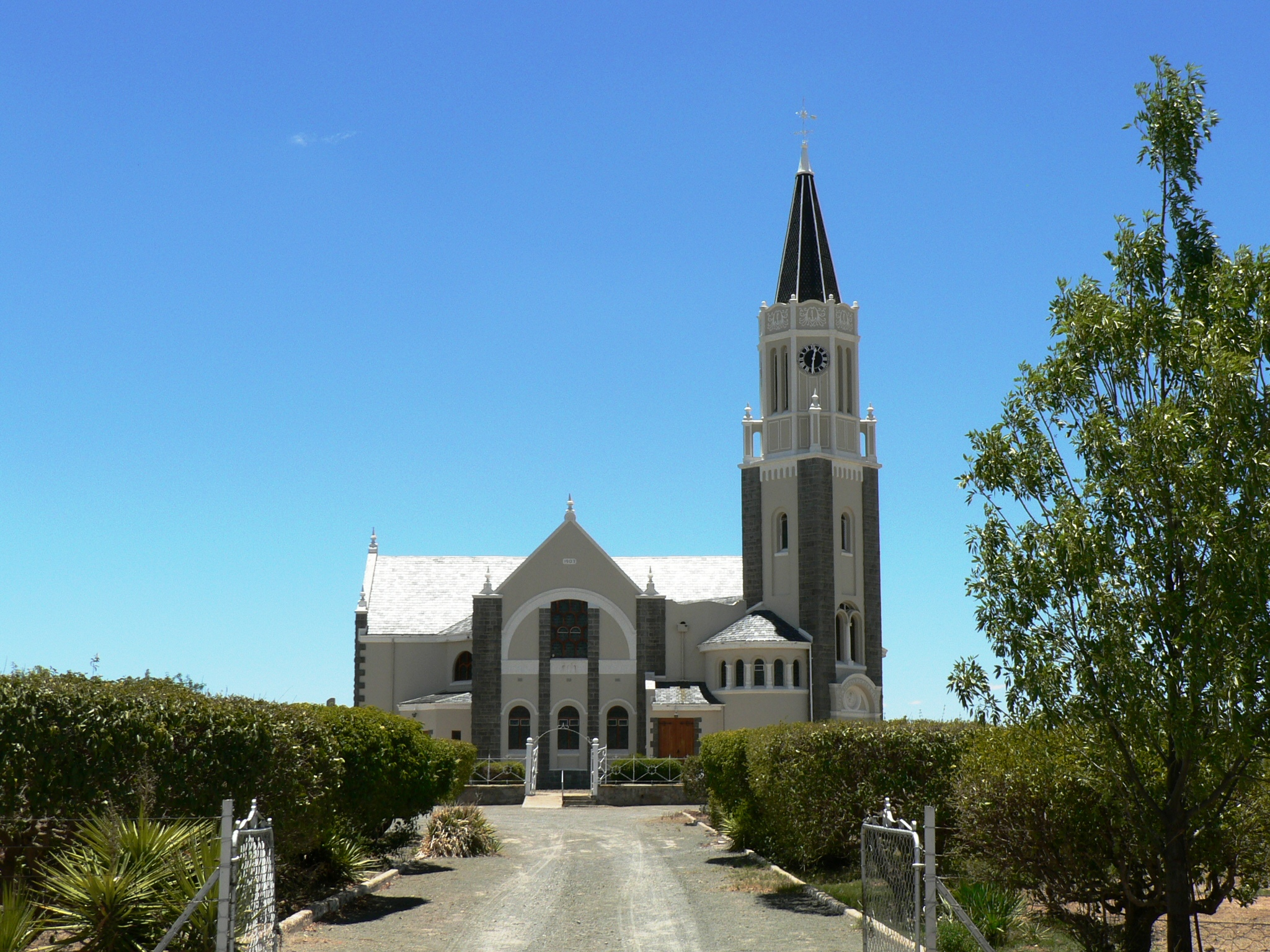
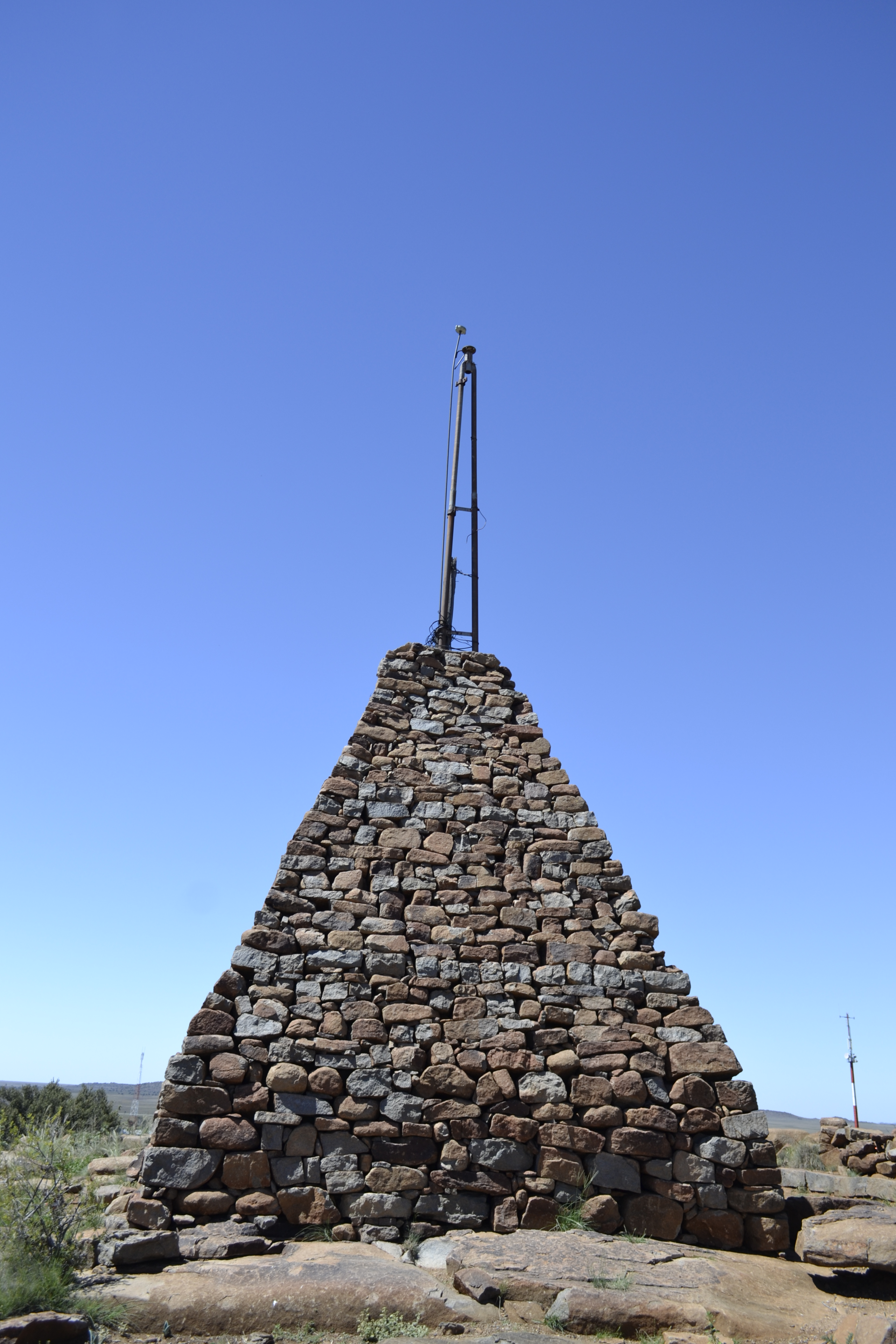
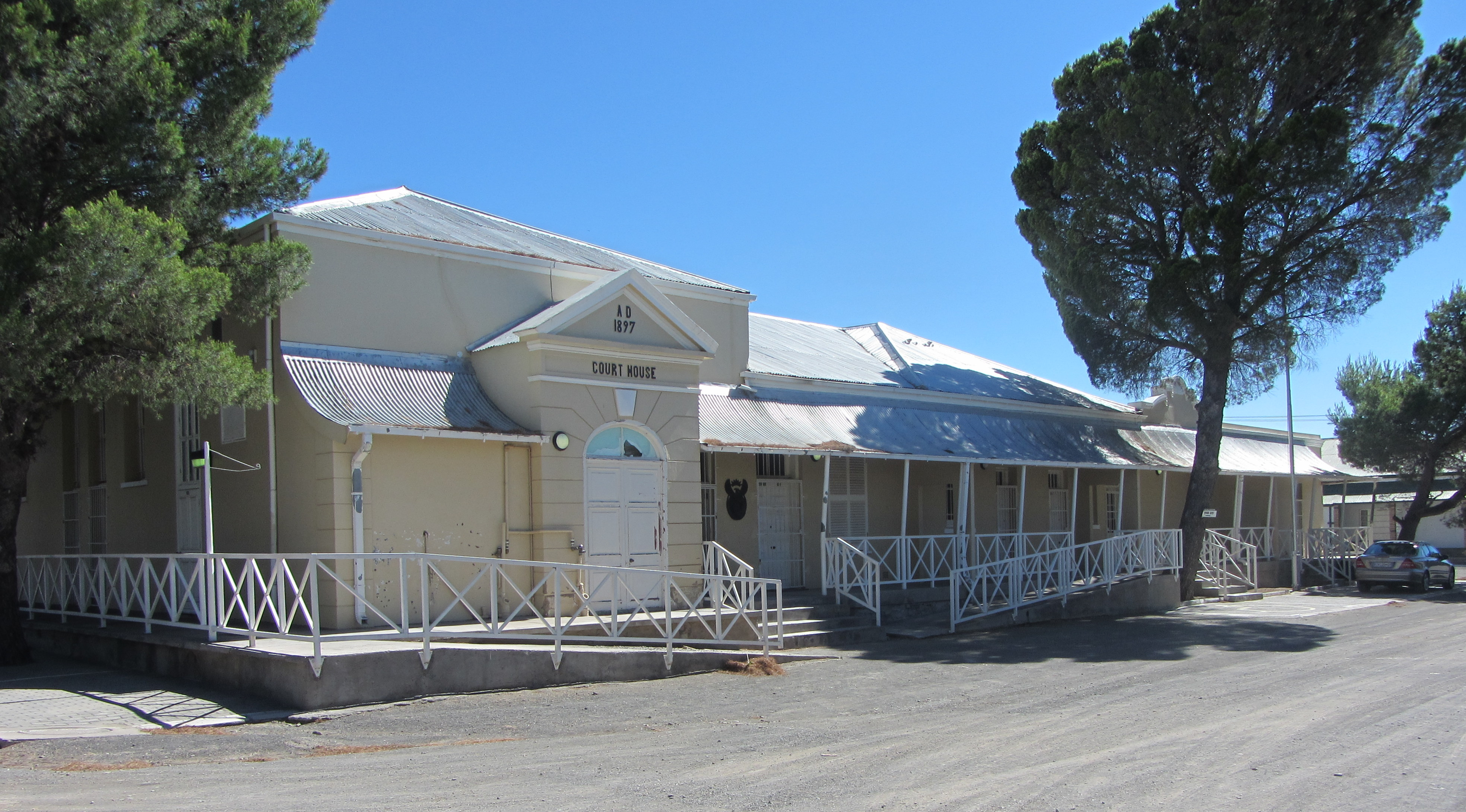
- View of Hanover from Trappieskop, Dutch Reformed Church, Trappieskop and Magistrates Court

- Location within Northern Cape Location within South Africa Location within Africa
- Coordinates: 31°4′6″S 24°26′23″E
- Country: South Africa
- Province: Northern Cape
- District: Pixley ka Seme
- Municipality: Emthanjeni

Government
  - Councillor: L.E. Andrews (ANC)

Area
  - Total: 80.77 km^{2} (31.19 sq mi)

Population (2011)
  - Total: 4,594
  - Density: 56.88/km^{2} (147.3/sq mi)

Racial makeup (2011)
  - Black African: 49.1%
  - Coloured: 46.4%
  - Indian/Asian: 0.5%
  - White: 3.4%
  - Other: 0.5%

First languages (2011)
  - Afrikaans: 54.9%
  - Xhosa: 39.3%
  - English: 1.5%
  - Sotho: 1.4%
  - Other: 2.9%
- Time zone: UTC+2 (SAST)
- Postal code (street): 7005
- PO box: 7005
- Area code: 053

Hanover is a small town in the Northern Cape Province of South Africa. Named after Hanover in Germany, the town was established in 1854.

Much of the farming in the area is with Merino sheep. Hanover has a local Spar and a Supermarket and small tuck shops. Hanover also has a Primary school (Grade R - 7) and a High School named Phakamisani High School (8 - 12). The Hanover citizens struggle to find jobs and go to De Aar, Richmond and Colesberg for grocery shopping. Hanover is split in two, namely Kleuring gebied and Kwezi.

== Tourist attractions ==
The Fountain, a powerful spring in town, releases about 205,000 litres of water per day. A footpath leads up to Trappieskop which offers panoramic views of the area.

Hanover claims to be the country's most central place. It is equidistant from Cape Town and Johannesburg, centrally positioned between Cape Town and Durban as well as Port Elizabeth and Upington and it is the hub of an arc formed by Richmond, Middelburg and Colesberg.

Historic figures were at the centre of life here, people like Olive Schreiner, author and women's rights champion, and the tempestuous Rev. Thomas Francois Burgers. Among its residents were the wealthy and eccentric. The town's chief constable was the grandson of Lord Charles Somerset, the magistrate's clerk a son of Charles John Vaughan, Dean of Llandaff, well-known churchman and devotional writer of his day, and the local doctor was the son of a former Solicitor-General of Jamaica.

Well-known people of today hailing from Hanover includes Zwelinzima Vavi, the General Secretary of the Congress of South African Trade Unions.

The country's first observatory once stood proud at the top of Trappieskop, however it has been moved and is now part of the observatory at Sutherland.

Today the busy Karoo N1 route cuts through the veld between the town and its cemetery. But during the last century all roads converged in Hanover and all travellers passed through the town. It was on an important stop for stage coaches carrying passengers to the Diamond Fields, and the Free State mail was carried through by post cart. Daily life bubbled with people ever on the move. But then in 1884, the advent of the railway deprived the town of much of its through traffic and its character slowly changed.

=== Link with Olive Schreiner ===
South African author and women's rights pioneer, Olive Schreiner, and husband Cron lived in Hanover from 1900 to 1907 in a typical small iron-roofed Karoo cottage with a "stoep". Schreiner House, on the corner of Grace and New street. Olive was very happy in Hanover where the Karoo air relieved her asthma. She wrote to friends saying, 'this is the prettiest village I have ever seen'.

== History ==
=== Early history ===
Farmers moved gradually northwards and settled in this area in the 18th century. One of the early farms was Petrusvallei which in time became Hanover. The farm was originally granted to W. L. Pretorius in November 1841, but things did not go all that well with him and by February the following year he sold to Jan J. Smook. Frederick von Malditz later acquired the property and later still Petrus J. Botha, who sold it to Gert Johannes Wilhelm Gouws, the grandson of Sterren Gauche, a German who had come to Africa in search of his fortune. Petrusvallei was part of an outlying district of Graaff-Reinet and simply known as Bo-Zeekoeirivier (Upper Hippopotamus River). Farmers had to undertake long and arduous journeys to Graaff-Reinet for church, communion or nagmaal services, marriages and baptisms. But in time they felt the need for a religious, administrative and educational centre of their own, so they petitioned the Government for a town.

On 17 July 1854, a six-man committee bought the farm for the sum of 33 333 Rixdollars. Their intention was to start a settlement and church farm. Gouws was retained as manager and J. J. Swart was in charge of finances. Survey work started almost immediately, and early in 1856 forty plots were sold. Soon a town mushroomed at the foot of a cluster of hills near a strong natural spring called The Fountain. It delivered over 200,000 litres of fresh water a day, and still does. By 13 October 1856, the affairs of this fledgling town were placed in the hands of a church council. At Gous's request it was agreed to name the village Hanover as his grandfather had come from that city in Lower Saxony, Germany.

A municipality was established and P. Watermeyer elected mayor. He also served the town as Member of Parliament until 1888. District boundaries were firmly established by January 1859, the same year the first church, a typical tiny cruciform thatched-roofed building, was completed.

When the first erven were sold, prospective residents were instructed to build directly on and parallel to the edge of the road with gardens at the back. In later years when verandahs came into fashion, these structures were allowed to encroach on the pavement. For this privilege home-owners paid a special tax of one shilling a year. They still pay for the privilege, but in 1994 the fee was raised to R10. The irrigation furrows, or leivoortjies, were built from The Fountain to take water to village vegetable gardens. The system started working in 1870, and has never changed, water flowing in the furrows day and night. All the original plots still get two irrigation turns a week, strictly according to the distribution chart drawn up in 1870.

Hanover was declared a magisterial district on 13 November 1876, and Charles Richard Beere was appointed magistrate. A man of foresight, Beere insisted residents plant trees so their descendants would have shade. With the help of prisoners he built an easy-to-climb, stepped footpath to the summit of the hill now called Trappieskop. Beere wanted visitors to share the superb views from its summit. He loved the Karoo and could often be found on the summit of Trappieskop watching the sun rise or set. When he died in 1881, a stone pyramid was erected on its summit to his memory and to honour his contribution to the development of the town.

Hanover grew rapidly. By 1881 a jail was built, but a courthouse only came in 1897. The town had a post and telegraph office, a bank, several general dealers, a hotel and a school. Its list of tradesmen included a mason, a farrier and groom, painter, miller, dam builder, brick maker, scab inspector, carpenter, wagon maker, butcher, a post rider and carriers to the railway station 18 km away. The original farmstead is today a national monument. It houses a small cultural history museum, and on display are old bottles, clothes, glassware, kitchen utensils and implements. There is also an intriguing model of the Dutch Reformed Church.

=== Boer War executions ===
In the cemetery on the outskirts of town a pyramid of stone marks the grave of three young men executed during the Anglo-Boer War. The people of Hanover were deeply touched by this event. A train had been derailed and plundered at Taaibosch, 20 km from town. Shortly afterwards several young men sleeping in the outside rooms of a nearby farm were taken into custody. They were charged with 'maliciously assisting Boer forces,’ robbery and the deaths of passengers. Tried on somewhat dubious authority by a military court at De Aar, three, Sarel Nienaber, J. P. Nienaber and J. A. Nieuwoudt, were shot. They protested their innocence to the end.

In H. J. C. Pieterse's book on General Wynand Malan's Boer War experiences, the general states that his commando was responsible for the derailment. The general says the young men were not involved at all. The British, in fact, had sent them to the farm to collect fodder for horses. After the war General Malan joined Olive and Cron Schreiner in a lengthy campaign to have the names of the three cleared. The pyramid of stone over their grave bears this inscription: 'Vengeance is mine; I will repay, saith the Lord'.
