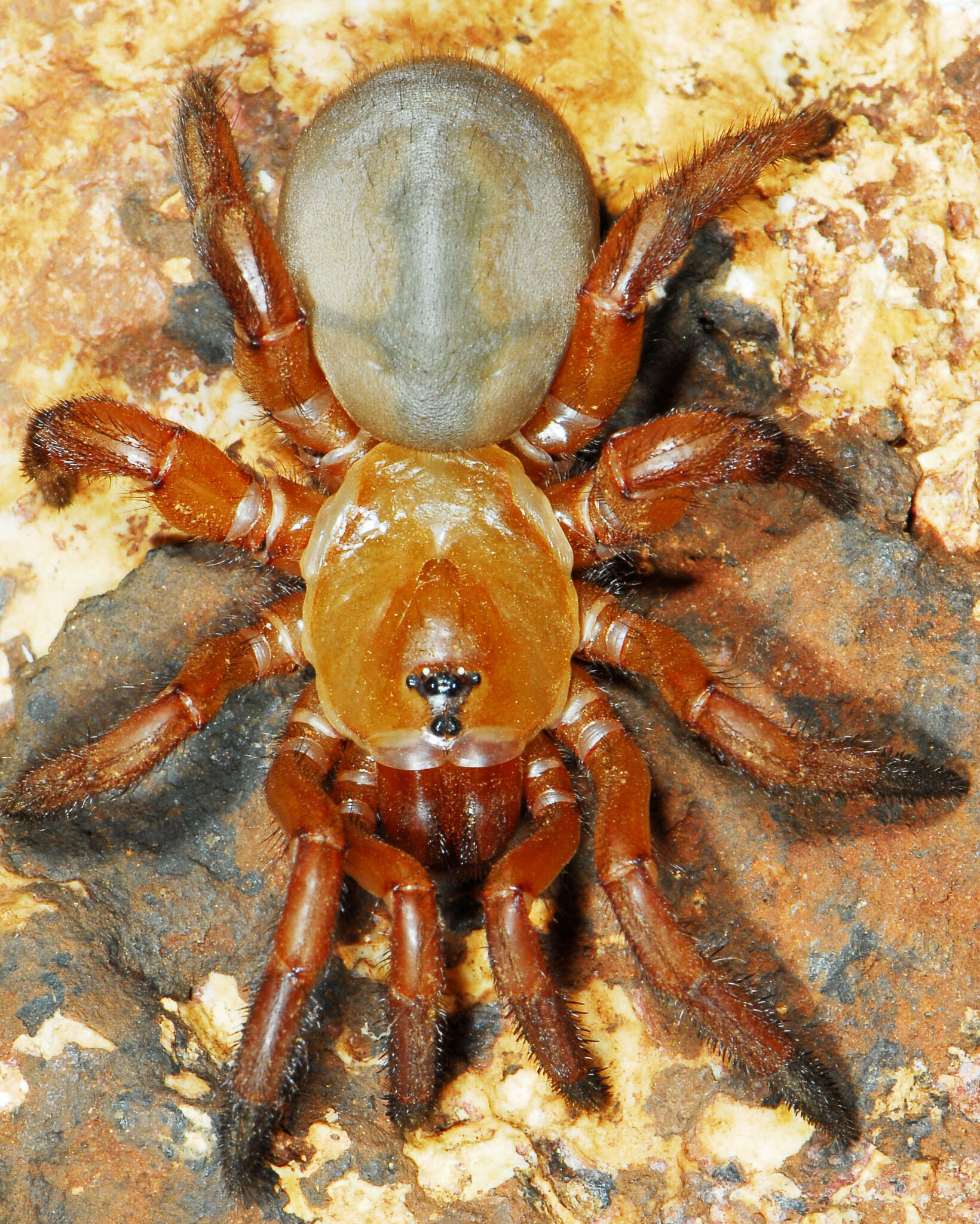
- Female
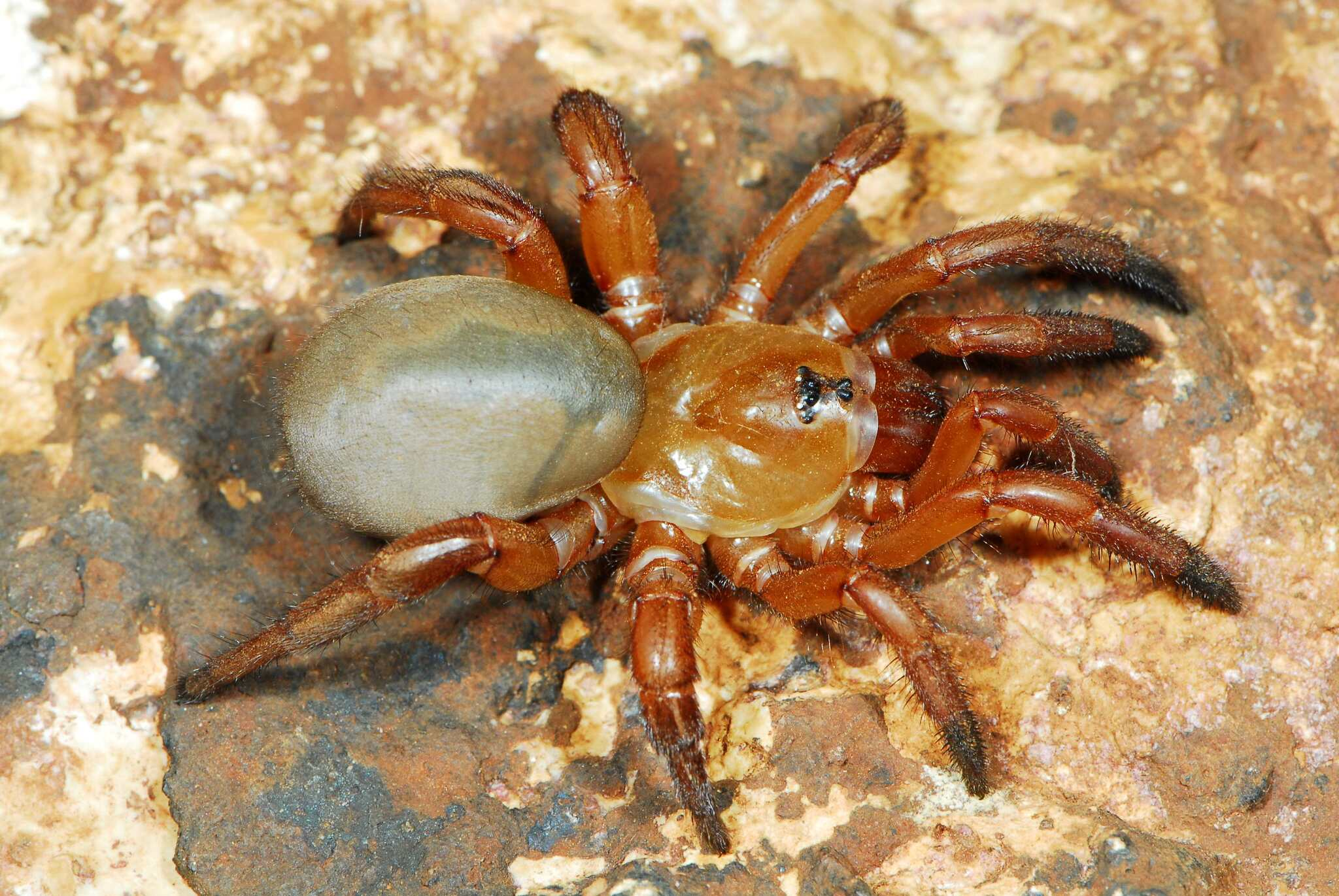
- Female

Scientific classification
- Kingdom: Animalia
- Phylum: Arthropoda
- Subphylum: Chelicerata
- Class: Arachnida
- Order: Araneae
- Infraorder: Mygalomorphae
- Family: Idiopidae
- Genus: Segregara
- Species: S. transvaalensis

Binomial name
- Segregara transvaalensis (Hewitt, 1913)

Synonyms
- Ctenolophus transvaalensis Hewitt, 1913; Acanthodon transvaalensis Hewitt, 1915

= Segregara transvaalensis =

Transvaal Segregara Trapdoor Spider

Species of spider

Segregara transvaalensis is a species of spider in the family Idiopidae. It is endemic to South Africa and is commonly known as Transvaal Segregara trapdoor spider. This species is the type species of the genus Segregara.

== Distribution ==
Segregara transvaalensis has a widespread distribution across five South African provinces: Free State, Gauteng, KwaZulu-Natal, Limpopo, and Mpumalanga. Notable locations include multiple protected areas such as Groenkloof Nature Reserve, Kruger National Park, Ndumo Game Reserve, and Nylsvley Nature Reserve.

== Habitat and ecology ==
The species inhabits the Grassland and Savanna biomes at altitudes ranging from 45 to 1,758 metres above sea level. The burrows are made in bare ground, between tufts of grass and on road embankments. The burrow entrances extend slightly above ground level. The trapdoors are very thin and wafer-like, almost circular and provided beneath with 3–8 minute tooth or claw marks nearer to the hinge than the centre. The burrows are not quite vertical, sometimes slanting backwards for about 2.5 cm, then dropping vertically for about 5 cm and doubling back again for 5 cm, with a total length of 12.5 mm.

== Description ==
Segregara transvaalensis is known only from females. No morphological description is provided in the available sources.

== Conservation ==
Segregara transvaalensis is listed as Least Concern due to its wide geographical range. The species is protected in more than 10 protected areas and there are no significant threats identified.

== Taxonomy ==
The species was originally described by Hewitt in 1913 as Ctenolophus transvaalensis from Newington in Mpumalanga. It was later transferred to Acanthodon by Hewitt in 1915, and finally placed in Segregara by Tucker in 1917. Tucker established the genus Segregara specifically to accommodate this species as the type species, along with one other species originally described in Acanthodon and Gorgyrella.
