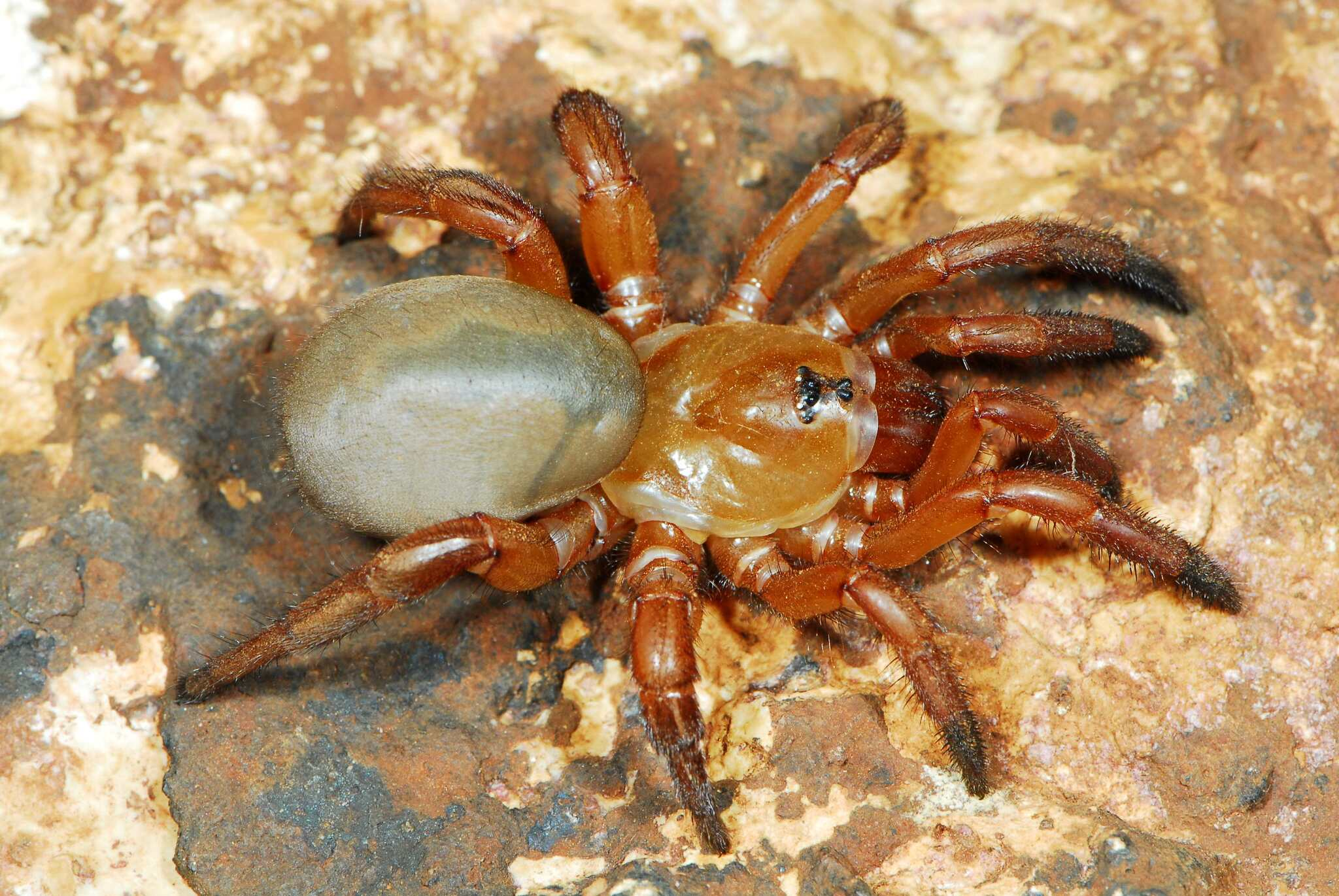
- Female S. transvaalensis
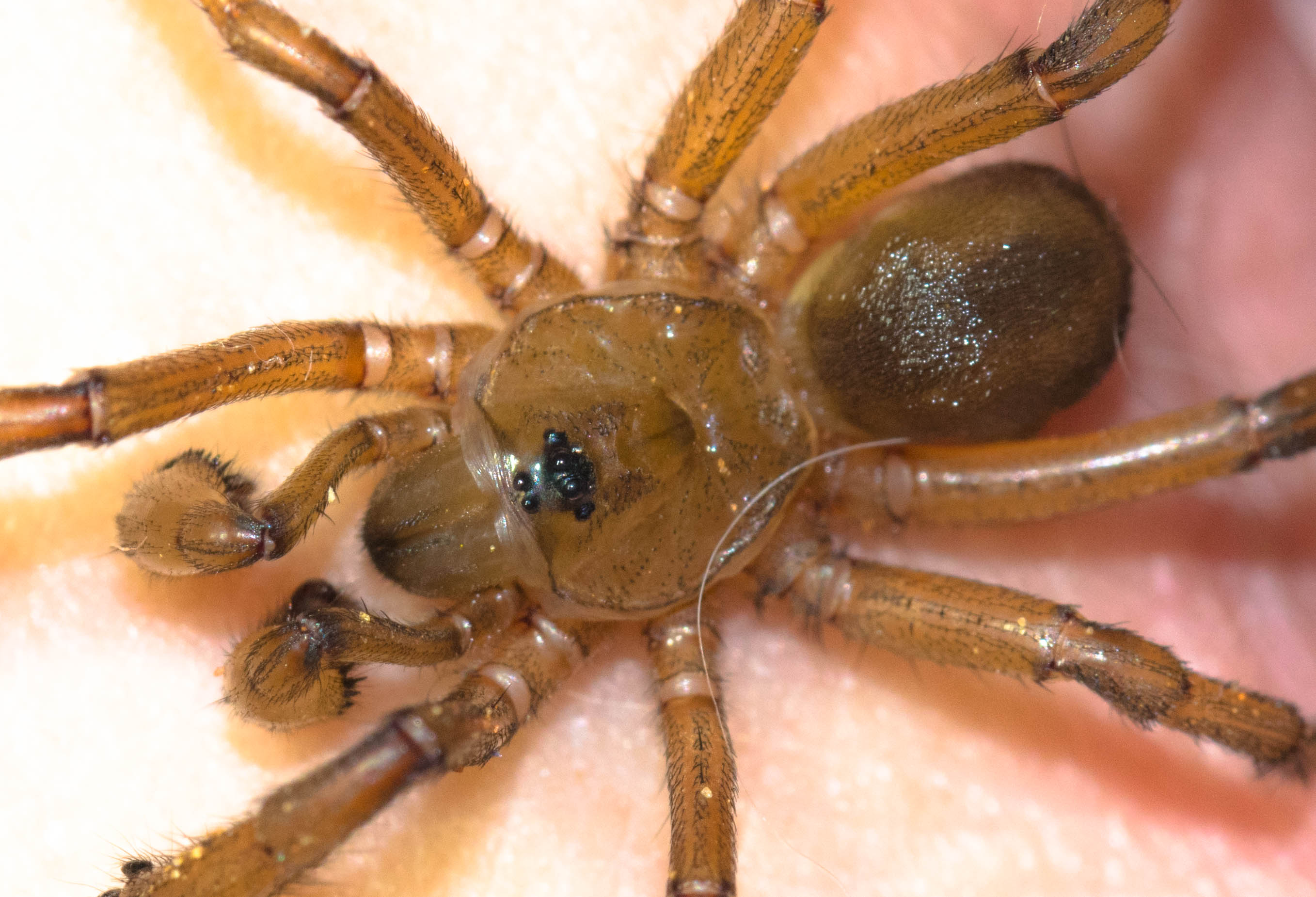
- Male Segregara sp.

Scientific classification
- Kingdom: Animalia
- Phylum: Arthropoda
- Subphylum: Chelicerata
- Class: Arachnida
- Order: Araneae
- Infraorder: Mygalomorphae
- Family: Idiopidae
- Genus: Segregara; Tucker, 1917

Type species
- S. transvaalensis (Hewitt, 1913)

Species
- S. abrahami (Hewitt, 1913); S. paucispinulosa (Hewitt, 1915); S. transvaalensis (Hewitt, 1913)

= Segregara =

Genus of spiders

Segregara is a genus of African armored trapdoor spiders with three South African species. It was first described by R. W. E. Tucker in 1917.

Originally placed with the Ctenizidae, it was moved to the Idiopidae in 1985.

== Life style ==
Segregara makes burrows in steeply sloping hillsides or in sloping ground under stones or in areas protected by vegetation. They close the burrows with trapdoors that hang almost vertically. The lid is heavy, thick and D-shaped, with the edges strongly bevelled, or the trapdoors are very thin and wafer-like, almost circular and provided beneath with three to eight minute tooth or claw marks nearer to the hinge than the centre.

== Description ==
Body size of females varies from 12 to 22 mm. The posterior eye row is procurved, and posterior median eyes are widely spaced. Tibia III is cylindrical. The sternum has three pairs of small marginal sigilla. Coxae at least III have spinules. The genus differs from closely related Gorgyrella by the shape of the posterior sigilla, which is larger in Gorgyrella.

== Taxonomy ==
Segregara was proposed by Tucker in 1917 to include two species originally described in Acanthodon and Gorgyrella. They are included in Segregara based on the presence and position of the sternal sigilla. Tucker provided a detailed discussion of the characteristics of the sigilla. The genus was transferred from the Ctenizidae by Raven in 1985.

== Species ==
As of October 2025, this genus includes three species:

- Segregara abrahami (Hewitt, 1913) – South Africa
- Segregara paucispinulosa (Hewitt, 1915) – South Africa
- Segregara transvaalensis (Hewitt, 1913) – South Africa (type species)
