= Segregara abrahami =

Scientific classification
- Kingdom: Animalia
- Phylum: Arthropoda
- Subphylum: Chelicerata
- Class: Arachnida
- Order: Araneae
- Infraorder: Mygalomorphae
- Family: Idiopidae
- Genus: Segregara
- Species: S. abrahami

Binomial name
- Segregara abrahami (Hewitt, 1913)

Synonyms
- Gorgyrella abrahami Hewitt, 1913; Acanthodon abrahami Hewitt, 1915

Species of spider

Segregara abrahami is a species of spider in the family Idiopidae. It is endemic to South Africa.

== Distribution ==
Segregara abrahami is endemic to the Eastern Cape province of South Africa. The species has been recorded from Alicedale, Burgersdorp, and Dassie Klip on the Bushman's River.

== Habitat and ecology ==
The species inhabits the Nama Karoo and Thicket biomes at altitudes ranging from 283 to 1,417 metres above sea level. Burrows are made in the steep sloping sides of hillsides or on sloping ground under stones or in areas protected by vegetation. The burrows run horizontally for 2 cm or more before descending downwards. The trapdoor hangs almost vertically and the lid is heavy, thick and D-shaped with the edges strongly bevelled. The hinge of the trapdoor is much longer than the width of the burrow.

== Description ==
Segregara abrahami is known from both sexes. In the female, the whole of the upper and lower body surfaces are more or less uniformly pale yellowish brown. The posterior sternal sigilla are long and narrow, not larger in area than either of the anterior sigilla. Males have the first metatarsus slightly bowed, with two spines at the apex inferiorly and three along the postero-inferior edge, but none along the antero-inferior edge. Total length is 19 mm in males and 12.5 mm in females.

== Conservation ==
Segregara abrahami is listed as Data Deficient due to limited knowledge about its current status, distribution and threats. The species is recorded from few localities, all sampled prior to 1913. More sampling is needed to determine the current species' range.

== Taxonomy ==
The species was originally described by Hewitt in 1913 as Gorgyrella abrahami from Alicedale. It was later transferred to Acanthodon by Hewitt in 1915, and finally placed in Segregara by Tucker in 1917.
