= Ctenolophus pectinipalpis =

Scientific classification
- Kingdom: Animalia
- Phylum: Arthropoda
- Subphylum: Chelicerata
- Class: Arachnida
- Order: Araneae
- Infraorder: Mygalomorphae
- Family: Idiopidae
- Genus: Ctenolophus
- Species: C. pectinipalpis

Binomial name
- Ctenolophus pectinipalpis (Purcell, 1903)

Synonyms
- Acanthodon pectinipalpis Purcell, 1903

Species of spider

Ctenolophus pectinipalpis is a species of spider in the family Idiopidae. It is endemic to South Africa and is commonly known as the Zululand front eyed trapdoor spider.

== Distribution ==
Ctenolophus pectinipalpis is endemic to KwaZulu-Natal, South Africa. The species is recorded from Ophathe Game Reserve, Ndumo Game Reserve, and Richards Bay.

== Habitat and ecology ==
The species inhabits the Indian Ocean Coastal Belt and Savanna biomes at altitudes ranging from 29 to 405 m above sea level. The species is a burrow living trapdoor spider.

== Description ==
Ctenolophus pectinipalpis is known only from the male. The colour is pale ochraceous, with the legs often faintly tinged with green, while the abdomen is deeply infuscated above with the under surface and the lower part of the sides pale yellowish. The carapace has a number of setiferous granules on the thoracic and on each side of the cephalic portion. All the tarsi are scopulate to the base but metatarsi are not scopulate. The first leg has the tibia shorter than the metatarsus and furnished distally at the inner lower edge with a pair of large tubercles, of which the distal one is produced into a stout, black spur-like process, while the proximal one is shorter. Total length ranges from 8.5 to 11.5 mm.

== Conservation ==
Ctenolophus pectinipalpis is listed as Data Deficient for taxonomic reasons. The species is described with type locality given only as Zululand and is probably under collected. Threats to the species are unknown. The species is protected in the Ndumo Nature Reserve and Ophathe Game Reserve. Some more sampling is needed to collect the female and to determine the species range.

== Taxonomy ==
The species was originally described by William Frederick Purcell in 1903 as Acanthodon pectinipalpis, with the type locality given only as Zululand. Purcell later moved it to Ctenolophus in 1904. The species has not been revised and remains known only from the male.
