= Segregara paucispinulosa =

Gravelotte Segregara Trapdoor Spider

Conservation status
- Least Concern (SANBI Red List)

Scientific classification
- Kingdom: Animalia
- Phylum: Arthropoda
- Subphylum: Chelicerata
- Class: Arachnida
- Order: Araneae
- Infraorder: Mygalomorphae
- Family: Idiopidae
- Genus: Segregara
- Species: S. paucispinulosa

Binomial name
- Segregara paucispinulosa (Hewitt, 1915)

Synonyms
- Acanthodon transvaalensis paucispinulosus Hewitt, 1915; Acanthodon paucispinulosus Hewitt, 1916

Species of spider

Segregara paucispinulosa is a species of spider in the family Idiopidae. It is endemic to South Africa and is commonly known as Gravelotte Segregara trapdoor spider.

== Distribution ==
Segregara paucispinulosa is endemic to Limpopo province in South Africa. The species has been recorded from Gravelotte (the type locality), Blouberg Nature Reserve, and Vhembe Biosphere Entabeni State Forest.

== Habitat and ecology ==
The species inhabits the Savanna biome at altitudes ranging from 589 to 1,327 metres above sea level. They live in silk-lined burrows.

== Description ==
Segregara paucispinulosa is known only from females. The species was originally described as a variety of S. transvaalensis, to which it is closely related. However, the spinules on coxa III are somewhat stouter but less numerous than in S. transvaalensis. The coxa of the third leg has a patch of stout spinules extending along the whole length of the segment posteroventrally. Total length is 15.5 mm in females.

== Conservation ==
Segregara paucispinulosa is listed as Least Concern due to its occurrence in an area with extensive remaining natural habitat. The species is protected in the Blouberg Nature Reserve. While still under-sampled, threats to the species are not considered significant.

== Taxonomy ==
The species was originally described by Hewitt in 1915 as Acanthodon transvaalensis paucispinulosus from the type locality Gravelotte. It was later elevated to species status as Acanthodon paucispinulosus by Hewitt in 1916, and subsequently transferred to Segregara.
