= Gorgyrella inermis =

Cradock Gorgyrella Trapdoor Spider

Scientific classification
- Kingdom: Animalia
- Phylum: Arthropoda
- Subphylum: Chelicerata
- Class: Arachnida
- Order: Araneae
- Infraorder: Mygalomorphae
- Family: Idiopidae
- Genus: Gorgyrella
- Species: G. inermis

Binomial name
- Gorgyrella inermis Tucker, 1917

Species of spider

Gorgyrella inermis is a species of spider in the family Idiopidae. It is endemic to South Africa and is commonly known as the Cradock Gorgyrella trapdoor spider.

== Distribution ==
Gorgyrella inermis is endemic to South Africa, where is known from the provinces Eastern Cape and Western Cape. It was recently collected from the Gamkaberg Nature Reserve in the Western Cape. It was originally collected from Cradock.

== Habitat and ecology ==
Gorgyrella inermis lives in silk-lined burrows made in the soil. The species is sampled from the Nama Karoo biome at altitudes ranging from 881 to 1116 m above sea level.

== Description ==
The species is known only from females. The carapace and limbs are pale ochraceous with the chelicerae yellowish brown. The abdomen is dirty pale yellowish without spots. The coxae of the pedipalpi and the labium are reddish brown. Total length is 20.5 mm.

== Conservation ==
Gorgyrella inermis is listed as Data Deficient by the South African National Biodiversity Institute for taxonomic reasons. Threats to the species are unknown. It is protected in the Gamkaberg Nature Reserve. Some more sampling is needed to collect males and to determine the species range.

== Taxonomy ==
Gorgyrella inermis was described by Tucker in 1917 from Cradock in the Eastern Cape. The species has not been revised and is known only from females.
