= Ctenolophus kolbei =

Kentani Front Eyed Trapdoor Spider

Conservation status
- Least Concern (SANBI Red List)

Scientific classification
- Kingdom: Animalia
- Phylum: Arthropoda
- Subphylum: Chelicerata
- Class: Arachnida
- Order: Araneae
- Infraorder: Mygalomorphae
- Family: Idiopidae
- Genus: Ctenolophus
- Species: C. kolbei

Binomial name
- Ctenolophus kolbei (Purcell, 1902)

Synonyms
- Acanthodon kolbei Purcell, 1902

Species of spider

Ctenolophus kolbei is a species of spider in the family Idiopidae. It is endemic to South Africa and is commonly known as the Kentani front eyed trapdoor spider. This is the type species of the genus Ctenolophus.

== Distribution ==
Ctenolophus kolbei is distributed across two South African provinces: the Eastern Cape and Western Cape. Notable locations include Kentani, Tsolwana Nature Reserve, Asante Sana Private Game Reserve, and Gamkaberg Nature Reserve.

== Habitat and ecology ==
The species inhabits Fynbos and Thicket biomes at altitudes ranging from 485 to 1,531 m above sea level. The burrows of C. kolbei are tubular and about 10 mm in diameter for the greater part except about 10 mm from the top where they widen gradually to be about 15 mm at the opening. The opening has a broad rim of silk about 4 mm wide. The lid is flat and not thickened and merely closes against the rim. The hinge is almost as broad as the greatest diameter.

== Description ==
Ctenolophus kolbei is known only from the female. The carapace is yellowish brown while the chelicerae are dark brown. The pedipalps and the anterior pairs of legs are brown, while the posterior pairs are yellowish brown to brownish yellow. The abdomen is sparsely tuberculate above. Total length ranges from 17 to 20 mm.

== Conservation ==
Ctenolophus kolbei is listed as Least Concern by the South African National Biodiversity Institute due to its wide geographical range. Threats to the species are unknown and extensive natural habitat remains within its range. It is protected in the Gamkaberg Nature Reserve, Asante Sana Private Game Reserve and Tsolwana Nature Reserve.

== Taxonomy ==
The species was originally described by William Frederick Purcell in 1902 as Acanthodon kolbei from Kentani in the Eastern Cape. He later designated it as the type species when he established the genus Ctenolophus in 1904. The species has not been revised and remains known only from the female.
