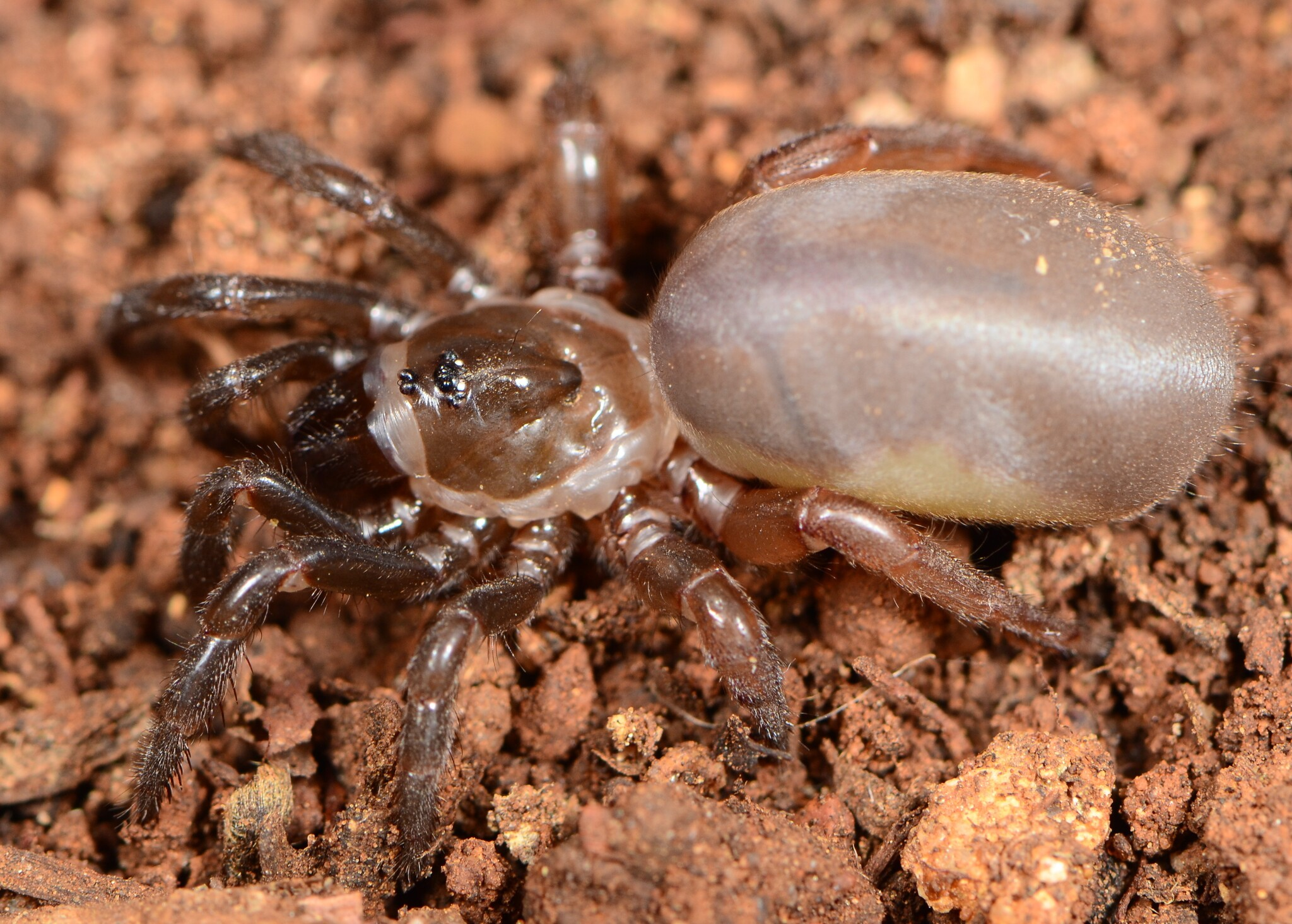
- Adult female
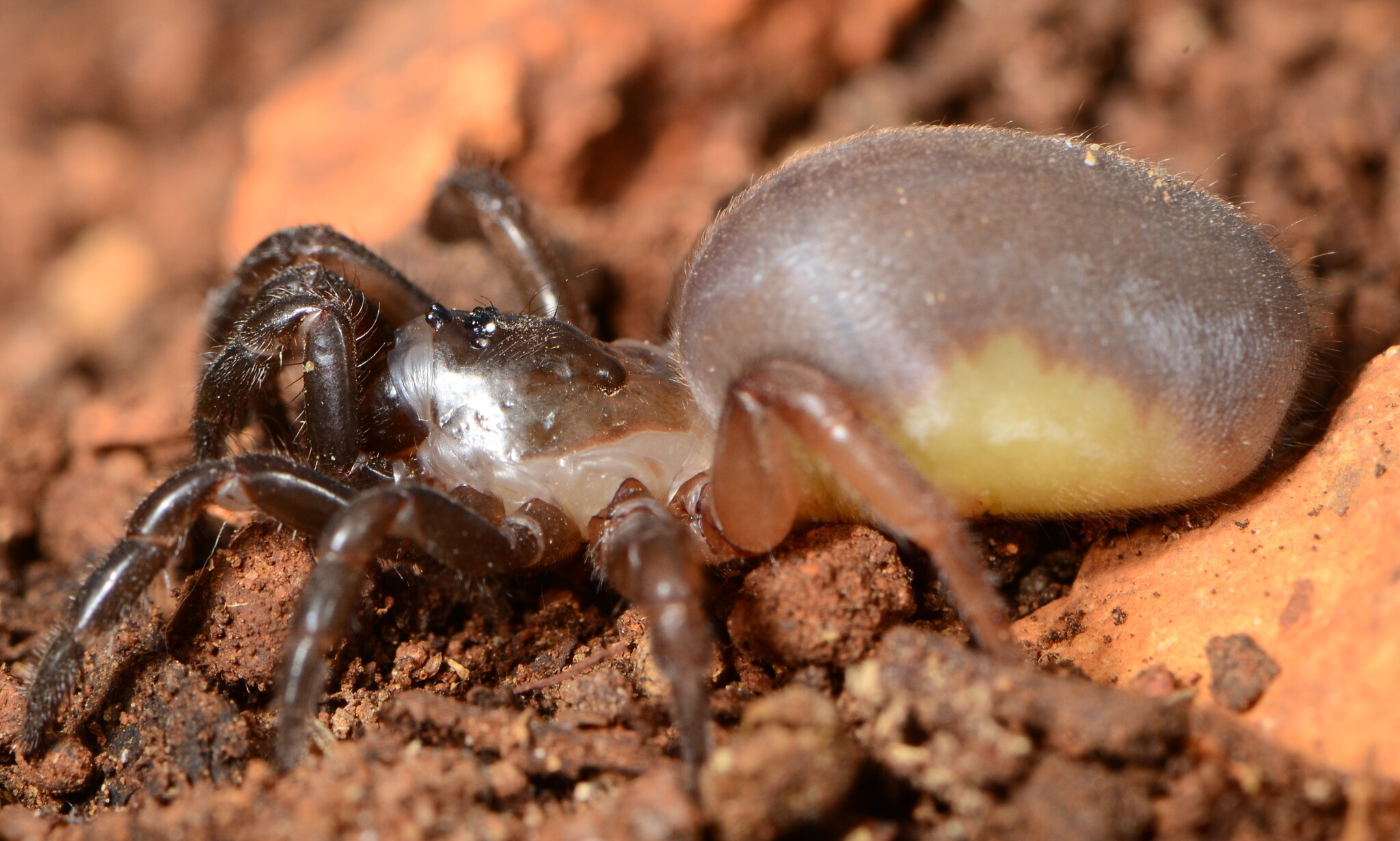

Scientific classification
- Kingdom: Animalia
- Phylum: Arthropoda
- Subphylum: Chelicerata
- Class: Arachnida
- Order: Araneae
- Infraorder: Mygalomorphae
- Family: Idiopidae
- Genus: Ctenolophus
- Species: C. fenoulheti

Binomial name
- Ctenolophus fenoulheti Hewitt, 1913

= Ctenolophus fenoulheti =

Newingston Front Eyed Trapdoor Spider

Species of spider

Ctenolophus fenoulheti is a species of spider in the family Idiopidae. It is endemic to South Africa and is commonly known as the Newingston front eyed trapdoor spider.

== Distribution ==
Ctenolophus fenoulheti is distributed across three South African provinces, Gauteng, Limpopo, and Mpumalanga. Notable locations include Roodeplaatdam Nature Reserve, Blouberg Nature Reserve, and Polokwane Nature Reserve.

== Habitat and ecology ==
The species inhabits Grassland and Savanna biomes at altitudes ranging from 470 to 1,487 m above sea level. The species is a burrow living trapdoor spider and has also been recorded in cotton fields.

== Description ==
Ctenolophus fenoulheti is known only from the female. The legs and carapace are light brown above and below, while the abdomen is also pale except in the anterior middle dorsal region. Coxa III has a strongly developed narrow patch of slender, bristly setae. The posterior median eyes are closer to posterior lateral eyes than to each other. Total length reaches 20 mm.

== Conservation ==
Ctenolophus fenoulheti is listed as Least Concern by the South African National Biodiversity Institute due to its wide geographical range. Threats to the species are not significant, as it is able to survive in agro-ecosystems. It is protected in the Roodeplaatdam Nature Reserve, Blouberg Nature Reserve and Polokwane Nature Reserve.

== Taxonomy ==
The species was originally described by John Hewitt in 1913 from Newington in Mpumalanga. The species has not been revised and remains known only from the female.
