= Ctenolophus cregoei =

Durban Front Eyed Trapdoor Spider

Conservation status
- Least Concern (SANBI Red List)

Scientific classification
- Kingdom: Animalia
- Phylum: Arthropoda
- Subphylum: Chelicerata
- Class: Arachnida
- Order: Araneae
- Infraorder: Mygalomorphae
- Family: Idiopidae
- Genus: Ctenolophus
- Species: C. cregoei

Binomial name
- Ctenolophus cregoei (Purcell, 1902)

Synonyms
- Acanthodon cregoei Purcell, 1902

Species of spider

Ctenolophus cregoei is a species of spider in the family Idiopidae. It is endemic to South Africa and is commonly known as the Durban front eyed trapdoor spider.

== Distribution ==
Ctenolophus cregoei is distributed across two South African provinces: Gauteng and KwaZulu-Natal. Notable locations include the Rietondale Research Station, Roodeplaatdam Nature Reserve, and Durban.

== Habitat and ecology ==
The species inhabits multiple biomes including the Indian Ocean Coastal Belt, Grassland, and Savanna biomes at altitudes ranging from 17 to 1,467 m above sea level. The species is a burrow living trapdoor spider.

== Description ==
Ctenolophus cregoei is known only from the male. The distal segments of the second leg and the two posterior pairs of legs are more yellowish in parts; sternum pale yellowish; coxae of legs pale yellowish, those of pedipalps brownish; abdomen black, the underside pale yellowish, the genital operculum brownish behind. The male has metatarsi I very distinctly curved when seen from the side; excavation of tibia of palp with broad, semicircular band of short, close-set spinules. Total length 11 mm.

== Conservation ==
Ctenolophus cregoei is listed as Least Concern by the South African National Biodiversity Institute due to its wide geographical range. While threatened by urban development around Durban and in Pretoria, this species is suspected to be under collected. It is protected in the Roodeplaatdam Nature Reserve.

== Taxonomy ==
The species was originally described by William Frederick Purcell in 1902 as Acanthodon cregoei from Durban. He later moved it to Ctenolophus in 1904. The species has not been revised and remains known only from the male.
