= Ctenolophus oomi =

Oomi's Front Eyed Trapdoor Spider

Conservation status
- Least Concern (SANBI Red List)

Scientific classification
- Kingdom: Animalia
- Phylum: Arthropoda
- Subphylum: Chelicerata
- Class: Arachnida
- Order: Araneae
- Infraorder: Mygalomorphae
- Family: Idiopidae
- Genus: Ctenolophus
- Species: C. oomi

Binomial name
- Ctenolophus oomi Hewitt, 1913

Synonyms
- Acanthodon oomi Hewitt, 1916

Species of spider

Ctenolophus oomi is a species of spider in the family Idiopidae. It is endemic to South Africa and is commonly known as Oomi's front eyed trapdoor spider.

== Distribution ==
Ctenolophus oomi is distributed across three South African provinces: KwaZulu-Natal, Limpopo, and Mpumalanga. Notable locations include Lüneberg, uMkuze Game Reserve, Kruger National Park, and Verloren Vallei Nature Reserve.

== Habitat and ecology ==
The species inhabits Grassland and Savanna biomes at altitudes ranging from 83 to 1,955 m above sea level. The species is a burrow living trapdoor spider. It was collected from various localities in the Carolina district, where some burrows were found on the upper face of a bank on an old road. The burrows were not very deep, about 7.5 cm with the silk lining extending above the soil surface. All the lids were decorated with bits of grass.

== Description ==
Ctenolophus oomi is known only from the female. The carapace and legs are olive above while the distal segments of pedipalps and anterior legs are very dark. The lateral surfaces of femora are pale, in parts almost white, while the patella and distal segments of leg IV are reddish brown. The lower surfaces are pale but darker anteriorly, and the abdomen is dark above and paler below. The carapace is as long as the patella, tibia and metatarsus of the first leg, and as long as the tibia, metatarsus and tarsus of the fourth leg. Total length ranges from 10 to 16 mm.

== Conservation ==
Ctenolophus oomi is listed as Least Concern by the South African National Biodiversity Institute due to its wide geographical range. This species has lost habitat to crop cultivation, mining, agro-forestry and urbanisation in Mpumalanga. However it is protected in the uMkuze Game Reserve, Kruger National Park and Verloren Vallei Nature Reserve.

== Taxonomy ==
The species was originally described by John Hewitt in 1913 from Lüneberg in KwaZulu-Natal. The species has not been revised and remains known only from the female.
