= Gorgyrella namaquensis =

Van Rhynsdorp Gorgyrella Trapdoor Spider

Scientific classification
- Kingdom: Animalia
- Phylum: Arthropoda
- Subphylum: Chelicerata
- Class: Arachnida
- Order: Araneae
- Infraorder: Mygalomorphae
- Family: Idiopidae
- Genus: Gorgyrella
- Species: G. namaquensis

Binomial name
- Gorgyrella namaquensis Purcell, 1902

Species of spider

Gorgyrella namaquensis is a species of spider in the family Idiopidae. It is endemic to South Africa and is commonly known as the Van Rhynsdorp Gorgyrella trapdoor spider.

== Distribution ==
Gorgyrella namaquensis is endemic to South Africa, where is presently known only from the type locality Van Rhynsdorp on the slope of the Giftberg, Western Cape.

== Habitat and ecology ==
Little is known concerning the habitat of the species. It is sampled from the Fynbos biome at an altitude of 132 m above sea level.

== Description ==
The species is known only from females. The carapace and limbs are pale ochraceous with the chelicerae yellowish brown. The abdomen is dirty pale yellowish without spots. The coxae of the pedipalpi and the labium are reddish brown. Total length is 30 mm.

== Conservation ==
Gorgyrella namaquensis is listed as Data Deficient by the South African National Biodiversity Institute for taxonomic reasons. Threats to the species are unknown. Some more sampling is needed to collect males and to determine the species range.

== Taxonomy ==
Gorgyrella namaquensis was described by W. F. Purcell in 1902 from Van Rhynsdorp. The species has not been revised and is known only from females.
