= Gorgyrella schreineri =

Common Gorgyrella Trapdoor Spider

Scientific classification
- Kingdom: Animalia
- Phylum: Arthropoda
- Subphylum: Chelicerata
- Class: Arachnida
- Order: Araneae
- Infraorder: Mygalomorphae
- Family: Idiopidae
- Genus: Gorgyrella
- Species: G. schreineri

Binomial name
- Gorgyrella schreineri Purcell, 1903

Species of spider

Gorgyrella schreineri is a species of spider in the family Idiopidae. It is endemic to South Africa and is commonly known as the common Gorgyrella trapdoor spider.

== Distribution ==
Gorgyrella schreineri is found in South Africa, where it is known from the provinces Eastern Cape, Free State, Gauteng, Northern Cape, and Western Cape.

Notable locations include Hanover, Bloemfontein, Pretoria, Ezemvelo Nature Reserve, De Aar, Kimberley, Prieska, Karoo National Park, and Worcester.

== Habitat and ecology ==
Gorgyrella schreineri lives in silk-lined burrows made in the soil. Description of the burrow and egg sac were provided by Purcell in 1903. The species is sampled from the Fynbos, Grassland, and Nama Karoo biomes at altitudes ranging from 242 to 1402 m above sea level. It has also been sampled from pistachio orchards.

== Description ==
The species is known only from females. The carapace and limbs are pale ochraceous with the chelicerae yellowish brown. The abdomen is dirty pale yellowish without spots. The coxae of the pedipalpi and the labium are reddish brown. Total length is 30 mm.

== Conservation ==
Gorgyrella schreineri is listed as Least Concern by the South African National Biodiversity Institute due to its wide range. There are no significant threats to the species. It is protected in the Ezemvelo Nature Reserve, Fort Brown Kudu Reserve, and Karoo National Park.

== Taxonomy ==
Gorgyrella schreineri was described by W. F. Purcell in 1903 from Hanover in the Northern Cape. Hewitt described a subspecies Gorgyrella schreineri minor in 1916, which is here listed under G. schreineri until more data become available. The species has not been revised and is known only from females.
