= Ctenolophus spiricola =

Kentani Front Eyed Trapdoor Spider

Conservation status
- Least Concern (SANBI Red List)

Scientific classification
- Kingdom: Animalia
- Phylum: Arthropoda
- Subphylum: Chelicerata
- Class: Arachnida
- Order: Araneae
- Infraorder: Mygalomorphae
- Family: Idiopidae
- Genus: Ctenolophus
- Species: C. spiricola

Binomial name
- Ctenolophus spiricola (Purcell, 1903)

Synonyms
- Acanthodon spiricola Purcell, 1903; Idiops spiriferus Roewer, 1942

Species of spider

Ctenolophus spiricola is a species of spider in the family Idiopidae. It is endemic to South Africa and is commonly known as the Kentani front eyed trapdoor spider.

== Distribution ==
Ctenolophus spiricola is distributed across two South African provinces: the Eastern Cape and KwaZulu-Natal. Notable locations include Kentani, Asante Sana Private Game Reserve, and Ophathe Game Reserve.

== Habitat and ecology ==
The species inhabits Savanna and Thicket biomes at altitudes ranging from 405 to 1,479 m above sea level. The species is a burrow living trapdoor spider. The type specimens were sampled from nests made under the shelter of roots in the forests. The silken tube is cylindrical and always descends spirally to a depth of 6–8 cm.

In the deeper part the tube is gradually widened, while at the upper end it becomes compressed and has an oval opening. The edges of the tube-lining are spread out horizontally on the surface of the ground, forming a flat rim about 1 mm wide all round, except at the middle of the hinge. The hinge is broad and situated along one of the longer sides of the oval rim.

The lid, which is D-shaped in outline, is peculiar. Its upper surface is strongly but irregularly convex and covered with earth and a minute green vegetable growth and often also tiny pieces of moss. The under surface is smooth and concave right up to the edge, which is quite sharp and fits against the outer edge of the outspread rim of the tube.

== Description ==
Ctenolophus spiricola is known from both sexes. The color is yellow while the abdomen is pallid with the dorsal surface infuscated. The cephalic portion of the carapace is slightly brown in places. Total length reaches 18 mm.

== Conservation ==
Ctenolophus spiricola is listed as Least Concern by the South African National Biodiversity Institute due to its wide geographic range. Threats to the species are not significant. It is protected in the Ophathe Game Reserve and Asante Sana Private Game Reserve.

== Taxonomy ==
The species was originally described by William Frederick Purcell in 1903 as Acanthodon spiricola from Kentani in the Eastern Cape. He later moved it to Ctenolophus in 1904. John Hewitt described the male in 1914. The species has not been revised. Idiops spiriferus proposed by Roewer in 1942 is a superfluous replacement name.
