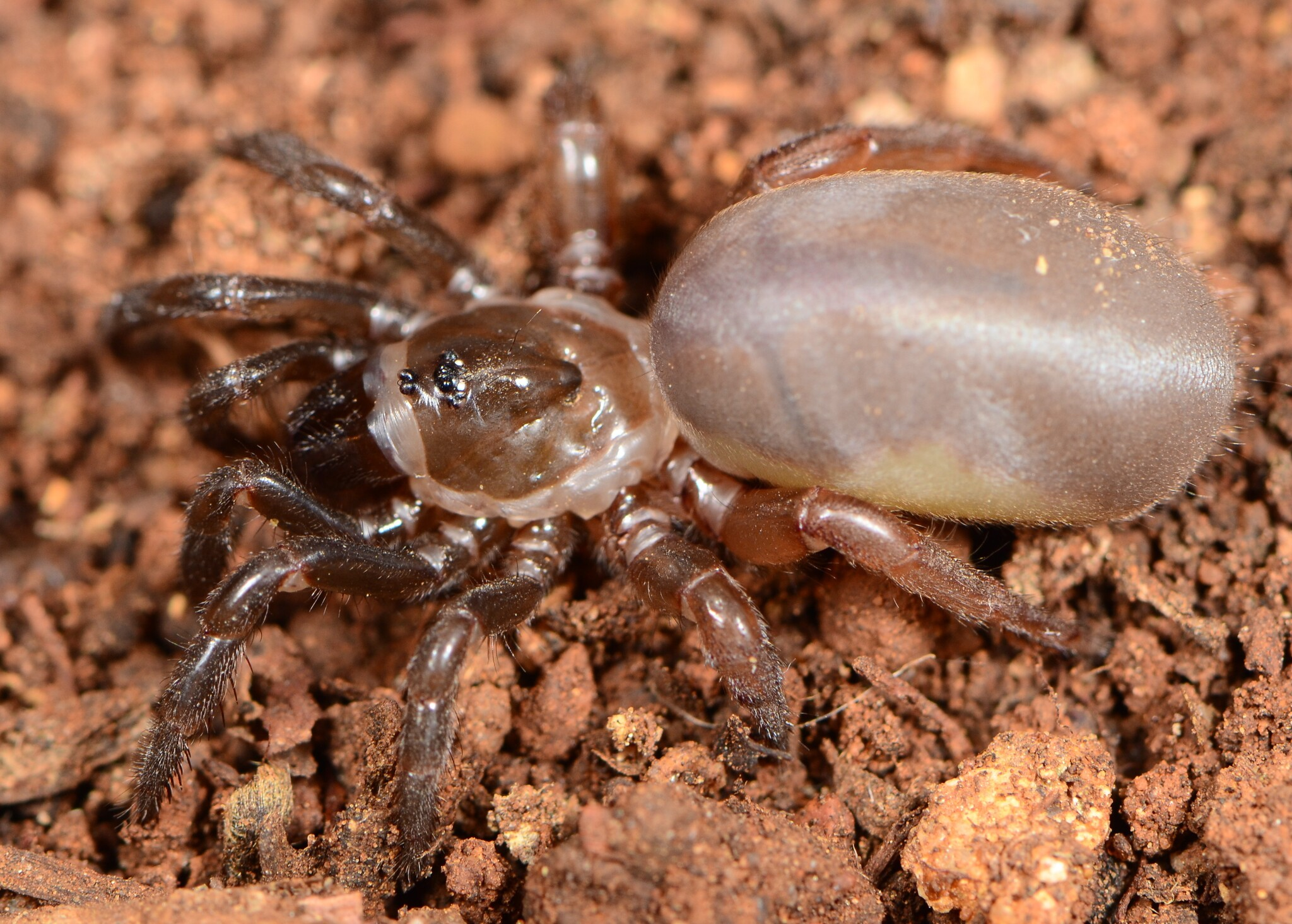
- Female
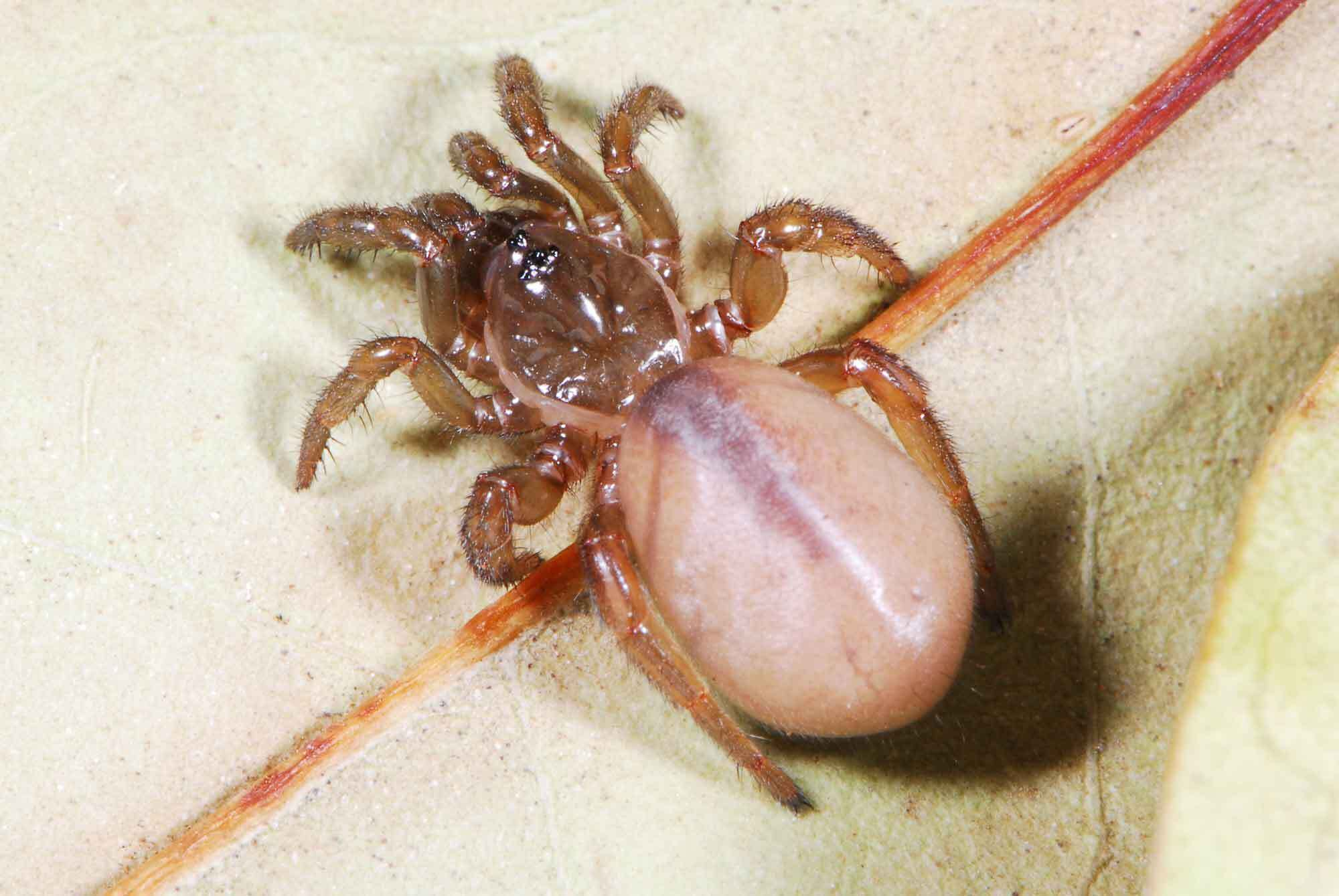
- Female

Scientific classification
- Kingdom: Animalia
- Phylum: Arthropoda
- Subphylum: Chelicerata
- Class: Arachnida
- Order: Araneae
- Infraorder: Mygalomorphae
- Family: Idiopidae
- Genus: Ctenolophus; Purcell, 1904

Type species
- C. kolbei (Purcell, 1902)

Species
- 6, see text

= Ctenolophus =

Genus of spiders

Ctenolophus is a genus of South African armored trapdoor spiders that was first described by William Frederick Purcell in 1904. Originally placed with the Ctenizidae, it was moved to the Idiopidae in 1985.

== Life style ==
Little is known about the behaviour of Ctenolophus species except for a few reports.

Ctenolophus oomi were collected from various localities in the Carolina district. Some burrows were found on the upper face of a bank on an old road. The burrows were not very deep, about 7.5 cm with the silk lining extending above the soil surface. All the lids were decorated with bits of grass.

The burrows of C. kolbei are tubular and about 10 mm in diameter for the greater part except about 10 mm from the top where it widens gradually to be about 15 mm at the opening. The opening has a broad rim of silk about 4 mm wide. The lid is flat and not thickened and it merely closes against the rim. The hinge is almost as broad as the greatest diameter.

== Description ==
Females measure 8 to 18 mm in body size.

The carapace is glabrous with an arched cephalic region. The chelicerae have a rastellum on a distinct mound. The median ocular quadrangle is usually wider posteriorly than anteriorly. The anterior lateral eyes are large, near the clypeal edge, usually on tubercles. The posterior row of eyes is procurved. The posterior lateral eyes are usually large and reniform or pear-shaped.

The cheliceral furrow has a row of large teeth on the inner row, with the outer row of teeth reduced or with only a few small denticles posteriorly. The labium is broader than long with cuspules. The sternum has two pairs of small marginal sigilla. The coxae III have strips of rather slender setae on the postero-ventral border.

== Taxonomy ==
The genus has not been revised.

Purcell in 1904 moved four species that he described in Acanthodon to Ctenolophus, a genus created by him.

Hewitt in 1913 regarded Ctenolophus a synonym of Acanthodon but A. petitii, the type species, was moved to Idiops, equivalent to considering Ctenolophus congeneric with Idiops. However, according to Tucker in 1917, Idiops and Ctenolophus differ in one respect, namely the row of teeth on the cheliceral groove, which was also recognized by Raven in 1985.

Only one of the six Ctenolophus species are known from both sexes. They all have wide ranges and are listed as Least Concern with only Ctenolophus pectinipalpis listed as Data Deficient.

== Species ==
As of October 2025, this genus includes six species, all endemic to South Africa:

- Ctenolophus cregoei (Purcell, 1902)
- Ctenolophus fenoulheti Hewitt, 1913
- Ctenolophus kolbei (Purcell, 1902) (type species)
- Ctenolophus oomi Hewitt, 1913
- Ctenolophus pectinipalpis (Purcell, 1903)
- Ctenolophus spiricola (Purcell, 1903)
