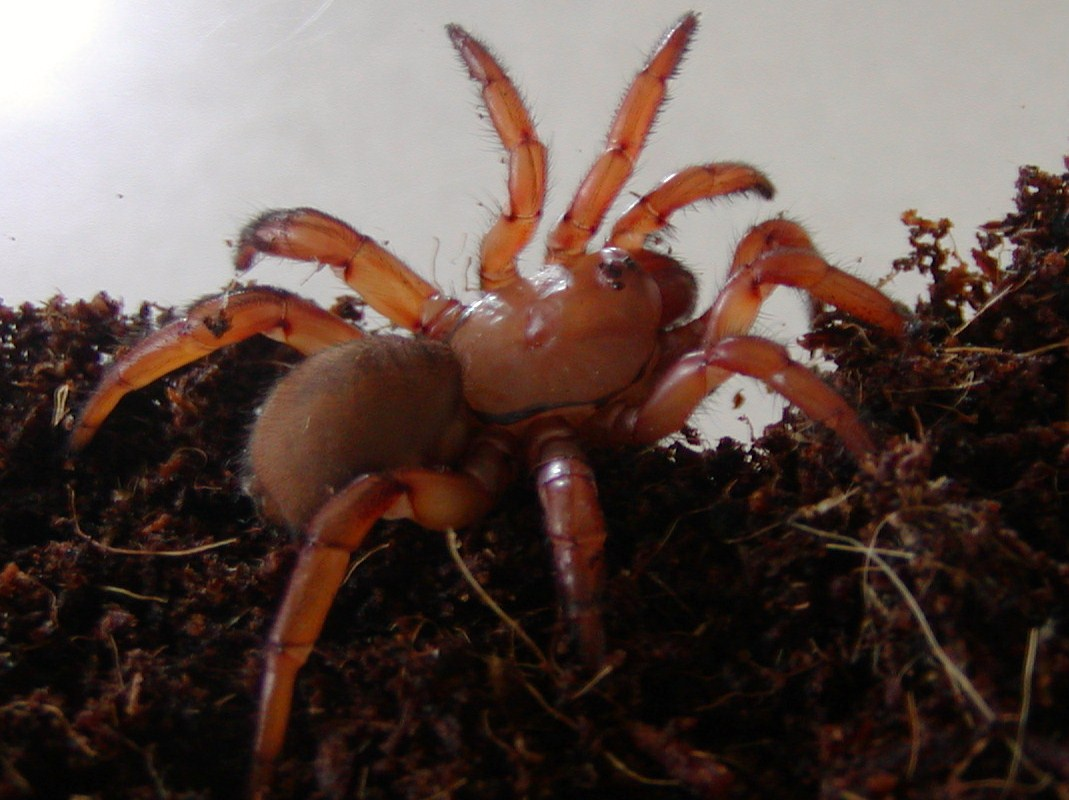
- Gorgyrella sp. "African Red Trapdoor Spider"

Scientific classification
- Kingdom: Animalia
- Phylum: Arthropoda
- Subphylum: Chelicerata
- Class: Arachnida
- Order: Araneae
- Infraorder: Mygalomorphae
- Family: Idiopidae
- Genus: Gorgyrella; Purcell, 1902

Type species
- G. namaquensis Purcell, 1902

Species
- 4, see text

= Gorgyrella =

Genus of spiders

Gorgyrella is a genus of African armored trapdoor spiders that was first described by William Frederick Purcell in 1902.

== Life style ==
According to Purcell in 1903, the burrows of Gorgyrella can easily be distinguished from that of Stasimopus. The burrows of Gorgyrella are more slanting and although cylindrical, they widen funnel-like towards the entrance.

== Description ==
Females measure 19 to 33 mm in body size while males are unknown.

The carapace is narrower in the posterior third. The posterior median eyes are widely spaced and close to the posterior lateral eyes. The cheliceral furrow has two rows of teeth with the outer row having fewer teeth than the inner row, sometimes with one or two strong outer flanking teeth in the middle or with smaller teeth posteriorly. The chelicerae are anteriorly narrowed.

The sternum has three pairs of sternal sigilla with the posterior pair enlarged. The lateral margin of the carapace is lightly sinuated above the base of leg III. The coxae II and III have large areas densely studded with spinules.

== Taxonomy ==
The genus was transferred from the Ctenizidae by Robert Raven in 1985. The genus has not been revised. Two of the species are Data Deficient and only Gorgyrella schreineri has a wide distribution.

== Species ==
As of October 2025, this genus includes four species and one subspecies:

- Gorgyrella hirschhorni (Hewitt, 1919) – Zimbabwe
- Gorgyrella inermis Tucker, 1917 – South Africa
- Gorgyrella namaquensis Purcell, 1902 – South Africa (type species)
- Gorgyrella schreineri Purcell, 1903 – South Africa
  - G. s. minor (Hewitt, 1916) – South Africa
