= List of Idiopidae species =

This page lists all described species of the spider family Idiopidae accepted by the World Spider Catalog as of February 2021:

== A ==
=== Arbanitis ===
Arbanitis

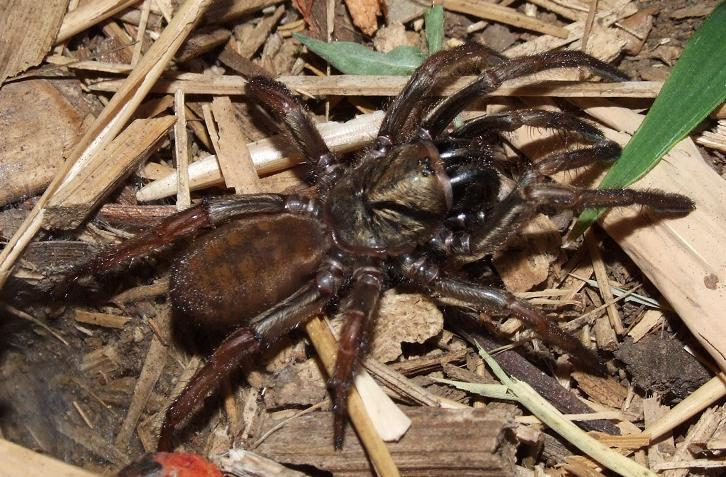
Sydney brown trapdoor spider
(Arbanitis rapax)

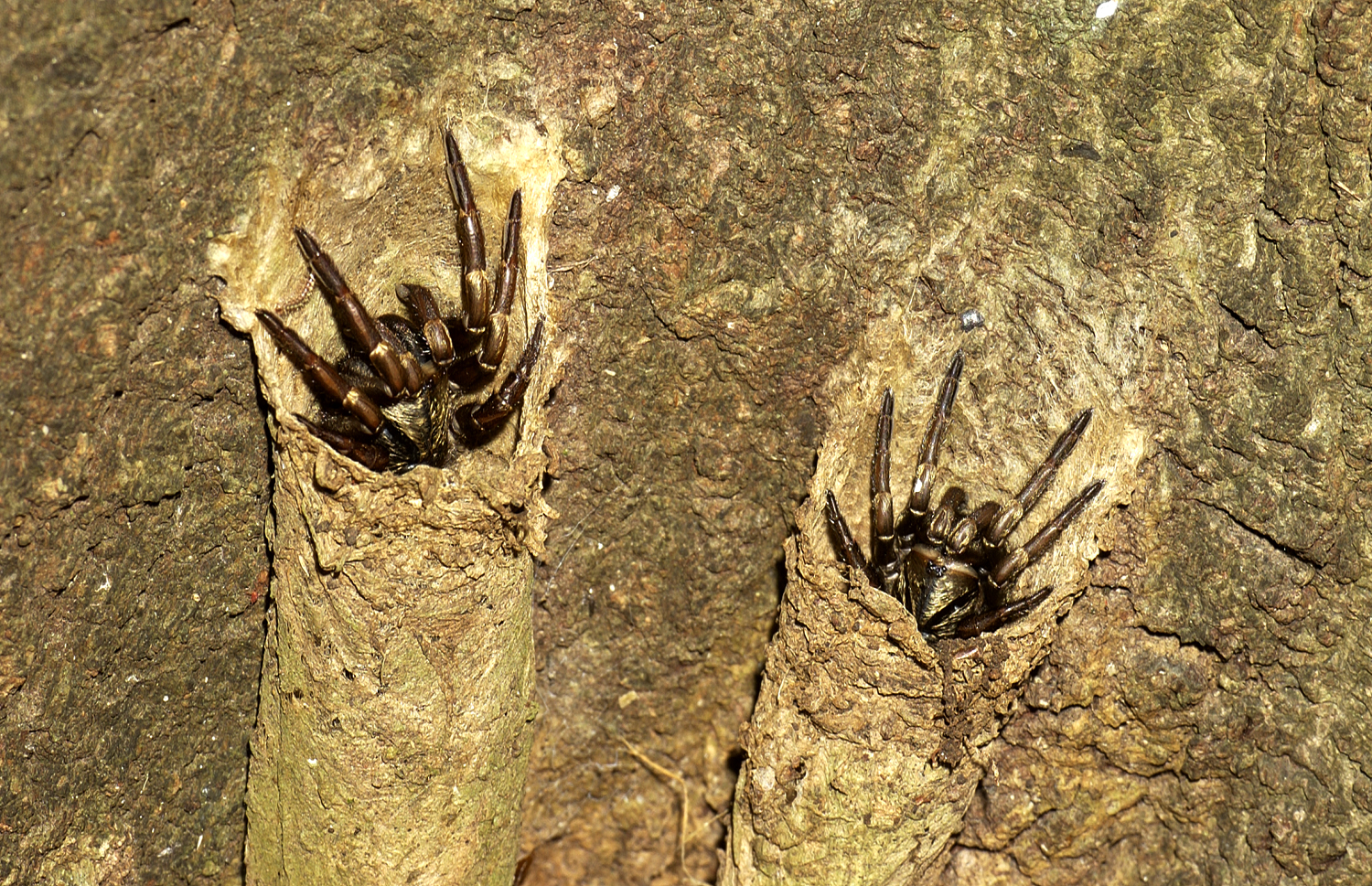
Arbanitis robertsi

Arbanitis L. Koch, 1874

- A. andrewsi (Hogg, 1902) — Australia (South Australia)
- A. baehrae (Wishart & Rowell, 2008) — Australia (New South Wales)
- A. beaury Raven & Wishart, 2006 — Australia (New South Wales)
- A. beni (Wishart, 2006) — Australia (New South Wales)
- A. billsheari (Wishart & Rowell, 2008) — Australia (New South Wales)
- A. biroi (Kulczyński, 1908) — Australia (New South Wales)
- A. bithongabel (Raven & Wishart, 2006) — Australia (Queensland)
- A. browningi (Wishart & Rowell, 2008) — Australia (New South Wales)
- A. campbelli (Wishart & Rowell, 2008) — Australia (New South Wales)
- A. cliffi (Wishart, 2006) — Australia (New South Wales)
- A. crawfordorum (Wishart & Rowell, 2008) — Australia (New South Wales)
- A. crispus (Karsch, 1878) — Australia (Tasmania)
- A. davidwilsoni (Wishart & Rowell, 2008) — Australia (New South Wales)
- A. dereki (Wishart, 1992) — Australia (New South Wales)
- A. dougweiri (Wishart & Rowell, 2008) — Australia (New South Wales)
- A. echo (Raven & Wishart, 2006) — Australia (Queensland, New South Wales)
- A. elegans Rainbow & Pulleine, 1918 — Australia (New South Wales)
- A. fredcoylei (Wishart & Rowell, 2008) — Australia (New South Wales)
- A. gracilis Rainbow & Pulleine, 1918 — Australia (New South Wales), possibly New Guinea
- A. grayi (Wishart & Rowell, 2008) — Australia (New South Wales)
- A. gwennethae (Wishart, 2011) — Australia (New South Wales)
- A. helensmithae (Wishart & Rowell, 2008) — Australia (New South Wales)
- A. hirsutus Rainbow & Pulleine, 1918 — Australia (Queensland)
- A. horsemanae (Wishart, 2011) — Australia (New South Wales)
- A. kampenae (Wishart, 2011) — Australia (New South Wales)
- A. kirstiae (Wishart, 1992) — Australia (New South Wales)
- A. linklateri (Wishart & Rowell, 2008) — Australia (New South Wales)
- A. longipes (L. Koch, 1873) (type) — Australia (Queensland, New South Wales)
- A. lynabra (Wishart, 2006) — Australia (New South Wales)
- A. macei (Wishart & Rowell, 2008) — Australia (New South Wales)
- A. maculosus (Rainbow & Pulleine, 1918) — Australia (New South Wales)
- A. mascordi (Wishart, 1992) — Australia (New South Wales)
- A. maxhicksi (Wishart & Rowell, 2008) — Australia (New South Wales)
- A. melancholicus (Rainbow & Pulleine, 1918) — Australia (New South Wales)
- A. michaeli (Wishart, 2006) — Australia (New South Wales)
- A. milledgei (Wishart & Rowell, 2008) — Australia (New South Wales)
- A. montanus Rainbow & Pulleine, 1918 — Australia (New South Wales)
- A. monteithi (Raven & Wishart, 2006) — Australia (Queensland)
- A. mudfordae (Wishart & Rowell, 2008) — Australia (New South Wales)
- A. ornatus (Rainbow, 1914) — Australia (Queensland)
- A. papillosus (Rainbow & Pulleine, 1918) — Australia (Queensland)
- A. paulaskewi (Wishart, 2011) — Australia (New South Wales)
- A. phippsi (Wishart, 2011) — Australia (New South Wales)
- A. rapax (Karsch, 1878) — Australia (New South Wales)
- A. raveni (Wishart & Rowell, 2008) — Australia (New South Wales)
- A. robertcollinsi Raven & Wishart, 2006 — Australia (Queensland)
- A. robertsi (Main & Mascord, 1974) — Australia (New South Wales)
- A. rodi (Wishart, 2006) — Australia (New South Wales)
- A. rowelli (Wishart, 2011) — Australia (New South Wales)
- A. shawi (Wishart, 2011) — Australia (New South Wales)
- A. sydjordanae (Wishart & Rowell, 2008) — Australia (New South Wales)
- A. taiti (Wishart & Rowell, 2008) — Australia (New South Wales)
- A. tannerae (Wishart, 2011) — Australia (New South Wales)
- A. tarnawskiae (Wishart & Rowell, 2008) — Australia (New South Wales)
- A. thompsonae (Wishart & Rowell, 2008) — Australia (New South Wales)
- A. trangae (Wishart, 2006) — Australia (New South Wales)
- A. villosus (Rainbow, 1914) — Australia (New South Wales)
- A. watsonorum (Wishart & Rowell, 2008) — Australia (New South Wales)
- A. wayorum (Wishart, 2006) — Australia (New South Wales)
- A. weigelorum (Wishart & Rowell, 2008) — Australia (New South Wales)
- A. yorkmainae (Wishart & Rowell, 2008) — Australia (New South Wales)

== B ==
=== Blakistonia ===
Blakistonia Hogg, 1902

- B. aurea Hogg, 1902 (type) — Australia (South Australia, Victoria, New South Wales)
- B. bassi Harrison, Rix, Harvey & Austin, 2018 — Australia (South Australia)
- B. bella Harrison, Rix, Harvey & Austin, 2018 — Australia (South Australia)
- B. birksi Harrison, Rix, Harvey & Austin, 2018 — Australia (South Australia, Victoria)
- B. carnarvon Harrison, Rix, Harvey & Austin, 2018 — Australia (Queensland)
- B. emmottorum Harrison, Rix, Harvey & Austin, 2018 — Australia (Queensland)
- B. gemmelli Harrison, Rix, Harvey & Austin, 2018 — Australia (South Australia)
- B. hortoni Harrison, Rix, Harvey & Austin, 2018 — Australia (South Australia)
- B. mainae Harrison, Rix, Harvey & Austin, 2018 — Australia (Western Australia)
- B. maryae Harrison, Rix, Harvey & Austin, 2018 — Australia (South Australia)
- B. newtoni Harrison, Rix, Harvey & Austin, 2018 — Australia (South Australia)
- B. nullarborensis Harrison, Rix, Harvey & Austin, 2018 — Australia (Western Australia)
- B. olea Harrison, Rix, Harvey & Austin, 2018 — Australia (Western Australia)
- B. parva Harrison, Rix, Harvey & Austin, 2018 — Australia (South Australia)
- B. pidax Harrison, Rix, Harvey & Austin, 2018 — Australia (South Australia)
- B. plata Harrison, Rix, Harvey & Austin, 2018 — Australia (Queensland)
- B. raveni Harrison, Rix, Harvey & Austin, 2018 — Australia (Queensland)
- B. tariae Harrison, Rix, Harvey & Austin, 2018 — Australia (Western Australia)
- B. tunstilli Harrison, Rix, Harvey & Austin, 2018 — Australia (South Australia)
- B. wingellina Harrison, Rix, Harvey & Austin, 2018 — Australia (Western Australia)

=== Bungulla ===
Bungulla Rix, Main, Raven & Harvey, 2017

- B. ajana Rix, Raven & Harvey, 2018 — Australia (Western Australia)
- B. aplini Rix, Raven & Harvey, 2018 — Australia (Western Australia)
- B. banksia Rix, Raven & Harvey, 2018 — Australia (Western Australia)
- B. bella Rix, Raven & Harvey, 2018 — Australia (Western Australia)
- B. bertmaini Rix, Main, Raven & Harvey, 2017 (type) — Australia (Western Australia)
- B. bidgemia Rix, Raven & Harvey, 2018 — Australia (Western Australia)
- B. biota Rix, Raven & Harvey, 2018 — Australia (Western Australia)
- B. bringo Rix, Raven & Harvey, 2018 — Australia (Western Australia)
- B. burbidgei Rix, Raven & Harvey, 2018 — Australia (Western Australia)
- B. dipsodes Rix, Raven & Harvey, 2018 — Australia (Western Australia)
- B. disrupta Rix, Raven & Harvey, 2018 — Australia (Western Australia)
- B. ferraria Rix, Raven & Harvey, 2018 — Australia (Western Australia)
- B. fusca Rix, Raven & Harvey, 2018 — Australia (Western Australia)
- B. gibba Rix, Raven & Harvey, 2018 — Australia (Western Australia)
- B. hamelinensis Rix, Raven & Harvey, 2018 — Australia (Western Australia)
- B. harrisonae Rix, Raven & Harvey, 2018 — Australia (Western Australia)
- B. hillyerae Rix, Raven & Harvey, 2018 — Australia (Western Australia)
- B. inermis Rix, Raven & Harvey, 2018 — Australia (Western Australia)
- B. iota Rix, Raven & Harvey, 2018 — Australia (Western Australia)
- B. keigheryi Rix, Raven & Harvey, 2018 — Australia (Western Australia)
- B. keirani Rix, Raven & Harvey, 2018 — Australia (Western Australia)
- B. kendricki Rix, Raven & Harvey, 2018 — Australia (Western Australia)
- B. laevigata Rix, Raven & Harvey, 2018 — Australia (Western Australia)
- B. mackenziei Rix, Raven & Harvey, 2018 — Australia (Western Australia)
- B. oraria Rix, Raven & Harvey, 2018 — Australia (Western Australia)
- B. parva Rix, Raven & Harvey, 2018 — Australia (Western Australia)
- B. quobba Rix, Raven & Harvey, 2018 — Australia (Western Australia)
- B. riparia (Main, 1957) — Australia (Western Australia)
- B. sampeyae Rix, Raven & Harvey, 2018 — Australia (Western Australia)
- B. weld Rix, Raven & Harvey, 2018 — Australia (Western Australia)
- B. westi Rix, Raven & Harvey, 2018 — Australia (Western Australia)
- B. yeni Rix, Raven & Harvey, 2018 — Australia (Western Australia)

== C ==
=== Cantuaria ===
Cantuaria Hogg, 1902

- C. abdita Forster, 1968 — New Zealand
- C. allani Forster, 1968 — New Zealand
- C. aperta Forster, 1968 — New Zealand
- C. apica Forster, 1968 — New Zealand
- C. assimilis Forster, 1968 — New Zealand
- C. borealis Forster, 1968 — New Zealand
- C. catlinsensis Forster, 1968 — New Zealand
- C. cognata Forster, 1968 — New Zealand
- C. collensis (Todd, 1945) — New Zealand
- C. delli Forster, 1968 — New Zealand
- C. dendyi (Hogg, 1901) (type) — New Zealand
- C. depressa Forster, 1968 — New Zealand
- C. dunedinensis Forster, 1968 — New Zealand
- C. gilliesi (O. Pickard-Cambridge, 1878) — New Zealand
- C. grandis Forster, 1968 — New Zealand
- C. huttoni (O. Pickard-Cambridge, 1880) — New Zealand
- C. insulana Forster, 1968 — New Zealand
- C. isolata Forster, 1968 — New Zealand
- C. johnsi Forster, 1968 — New Zealand
- C. kakahuensis Forster, 1968 — New Zealand
- C. kakanuiensis Forster, 1968 — New Zealand
- C. lomasi Forster, 1968 — New Zealand
- C. magna Forster, 1968 — New Zealand
- C. marplesi (Todd, 1945) — New Zealand
- C. maxima Forster, 1968 — New Zealand
- C. medialis Forster, 1968 — New Zealand
- C. mestoni (Hickman, 1928) — Australia (Tasmania)
- C. minor Forster, 1968 — New Zealand
- C. myersi Forster, 1968 — New Zealand
- C. napua Forster, 1968 — New Zealand
- C. orepukiensis Forster, 1968 — New Zealand
- C. parrotti Forster, 1968 — New Zealand
- C. pilama Forster, 1968 — New Zealand
- C. prina Forster, 1968 — New Zealand
- C. reducta Forster, 1968 — New Zealand
- C. secunda Forster, 1968 — New Zealand
- C. sinclairi Forster, 1968 — New Zealand
- C. stephenensis Forster, 1968 — New Zealand
- C. stewarti (Todd, 1945) — New Zealand
- C. sylvatica Forster, 1968 — New Zealand
- C. toddae Forster, 1968 — New Zealand
- C. vellosa Forster, 1968 — New Zealand
- C. wanganuiensis (Todd, 1945) — New Zealand

=== Cataxia ===
Cataxia Rainbow, 1914

- C. babindaensis Main, 1969 — Australia (Queensland)
- C. barrettae Rix, Bain, Main & Harvey, 2017 — Australia (Western Australia)
- C. bolganupensis (Main, 1985) — Australia (Western Australia)
- C. colesi Rix, Bain, Main & Harvey, 2017 — Australia (Western Australia)
- C. cunicularis (Main, 1983) — Australia (Queensland)
- C. dietrichae Main, 1985 — Australia (Queensland)
- C. eungellaensis Main, 1969 — Australia (Queensland)
- C. maculata Rainbow, 1914 (type) — Australia (Queensland)
- C. melindae Rix, Bain, Main & Harvey, 2017 — Australia (Western Australia)
- C. pallida (Rainbow & Pulleine, 1918) — Australia (Queensland)
- C. pulleinei (Rainbow, 1914) — Australia (Queensland, New South Wales)
- C. sandsorum Rix, Bain, Main & Harvey, 2017 — Australia (Western Australia)
- C. spinipectoris Main, 1969 — Australia (Queensland)
- C. stirlingi (Main, 1985) — Australia (Western Australia)
- C. victoriae (Main, 1985) — Australia (Victoria)

=== Cryptoforis ===
Cryptoforis Wilson, Rix & Raven, 2020

- C. absona Wilson, Raven & Rix, 2021 – Australia (New South Wales)
- C. arenaria Wilson, Raven & Rix, 2021 – Australia (Queensland)
- C. cairncross Wilson, Raven & Rix, 2021 – Australia (Queensland)
- C. cassisi Wilson, Raven & Rix, 2021 – Australia (New South Wales)
- C. celata Wilson, Raven & Rix, 2021 – Australia (New South Wales)
- C. cooloola Wilson, Raven & Rix, 2021 – Australia (Queensland)
- C. fallax Wilson, Raven & Rix, 2021 – Australia (New South Wales)
- C. grayi Wilson, Raven & Rix, 2021 – Australia (New South Wales)
- C. hickmani Wilson, Raven & Rix, 2021 – Australia (Tasmania)
- C. hughesae Wilson, Rix & Raven, 2020 (type) – Australia (Queensland)
- C. mainae Wilson, Raven & Rix, 2021 – Australia (Queensland, New South Wales)
- C. montana Wilson, Raven & Rix, 2021 – Australia (Queensland)
- C. monteithi Wilson, Raven & Rix, 2021 – Australia (Queensland)
- C. tasmanica (Hickman, 1928) – Australia (Tasmania)
- C. victoriensis (Main, 1995) – Australia (Victoria)
- C. woondum Wilson, Raven & Rix, 2021 – Australia (Queensland)
- C. xenophila Wilson, Raven & Rix, 2021 – Australia (Tasmania)
- C. zophera Wilson, Raven & Rix, 2021 – Australia (Victoria)

=== Ctenolophus ===
Ctenolophus Purcell, 1904

- C. cregoei (Purcell, 1902) — South Africa
- C. fenoulheti Hewitt, 1913 — South Africa
- C. kolbei (Purcell, 1902) (type) — South Africa
- C. oomi Hewitt, 1913 — South Africa
- C. pectinipalpis (Purcell, 1903) — South Africa
- C. spiricola (Purcell, 1903) — South Africa

== E ==
=== Eucanippe ===
Eucanippe Rix, Main, Raven & Harvey, 2017

- E. absita Rix, Main, Raven & Harvey, 2018 — Australia (Western Australia)
- E. agastachys Rix, Main, Raven & Harvey, 2018 — Australia (Western Australia)
- E. bifida Rix, Main, Raven & Harvey, 2017 (type) — Australia (Western Australia)
- E. eucla Rix, Main, Raven & Harvey, 2018 — Australia (Western Australia)
- E. mallee Rix, Main, Raven & Harvey, 2018 — Australia (Western Australia)
- E. mouldsi Rix, Main, Raven & Harvey, 2018 — Australia (Western Australia)
- E. nemestrina Rix, Main, Raven & Harvey, 2018 — Australia (Western Australia)

=== Eucyrtops ===
Eucyrtops Pocock, 1897

- E. eremaeus Main, 1957 — Australia (Western Australia)
- E. ksenijae(Rix & Harvey, 2022) – Australia (Western Australia)
- E. latior (O. Pickard-Cambridge, 1877) (type) — Australia (Western Australia)

=== Euoplos ===
Euoplos Rainbow, 1914

- Euoplos bairnsdale (Main, 1995) – Australia (Victoria)
- Euoplos ballidu (Main, 2000) – Australia (Western Australia)
- Euoplos booloumba (Wilson & Rix, 2021) – Australia (Queensland)
- Euoplos cornishi Rix, Wilson & Harvey, 2019 – Australia (Western Australia)
- Euoplos crenatus Wilson, Rix & Raven, 2019 – Australia (Queensland)
- Euoplos eungellaensis (Wilson, Harvey & Rix, 2022) – Australia (Queensland)
- Euoplos festivus (Rainbow & Pulleine, 1918) – Australia (Western Australia)
- Euoplos goomboorian Wilson, Rix & Raven, 2019 – Australia (Queensland)
- Euoplos grandis Wilson & Rix, 2019 – Australia (Queensland)
- Euoplos hoggi (Simon, 1908) – Australia (Western Australia, South Australia)
- Euoplos inornatus (Rainbow & Pulleine, 1918) – Australia (Western Australia)
- Euoplos jayneae (Wilson & Rix, 2021) – Australia (Queensland)
- Euoplos kalbarri Rix, Wilson & Harvey, 2019 – Australia (Western Australia)
- Euoplos mcmillani (Main, 2000) – Australia (Western Australia)
- Euoplos ornatus (Rainbow & Pulleine, 1918) – Australia (Queensland)
- Euoplos raveni (Wilson & Rix, 2021) – Australia (Queensland)
- Euoplos regalis (Wilson & Rix, 2021) – Australia (Queensland)
- Euoplos saplan Rix, Wilson & Harvey, 2019 – Australia (Western Australia)
- Euoplos schmidti (Wilson & Rix, 2021) – Australia (Queensland)
- Euoplos similaris (Rainbow & Pulleine, 1918) – Australia (Queensland)
- Euoplos spinnipes Rainbow, 1914 (type) – Australia (Queensland)
- Euoplos thynnearum Wilson, Rix & Raven, 2019 – Australia (Queensland)
- Euoplos turrificus Wilson, Rix & Raven, 2019 – Australia (Queensland)
- Euoplos variabilis (Rainbow & Pulleine, 1918) – Australia (Queensland, New South Wales)

== G ==
=== Gaius ===
Gaius

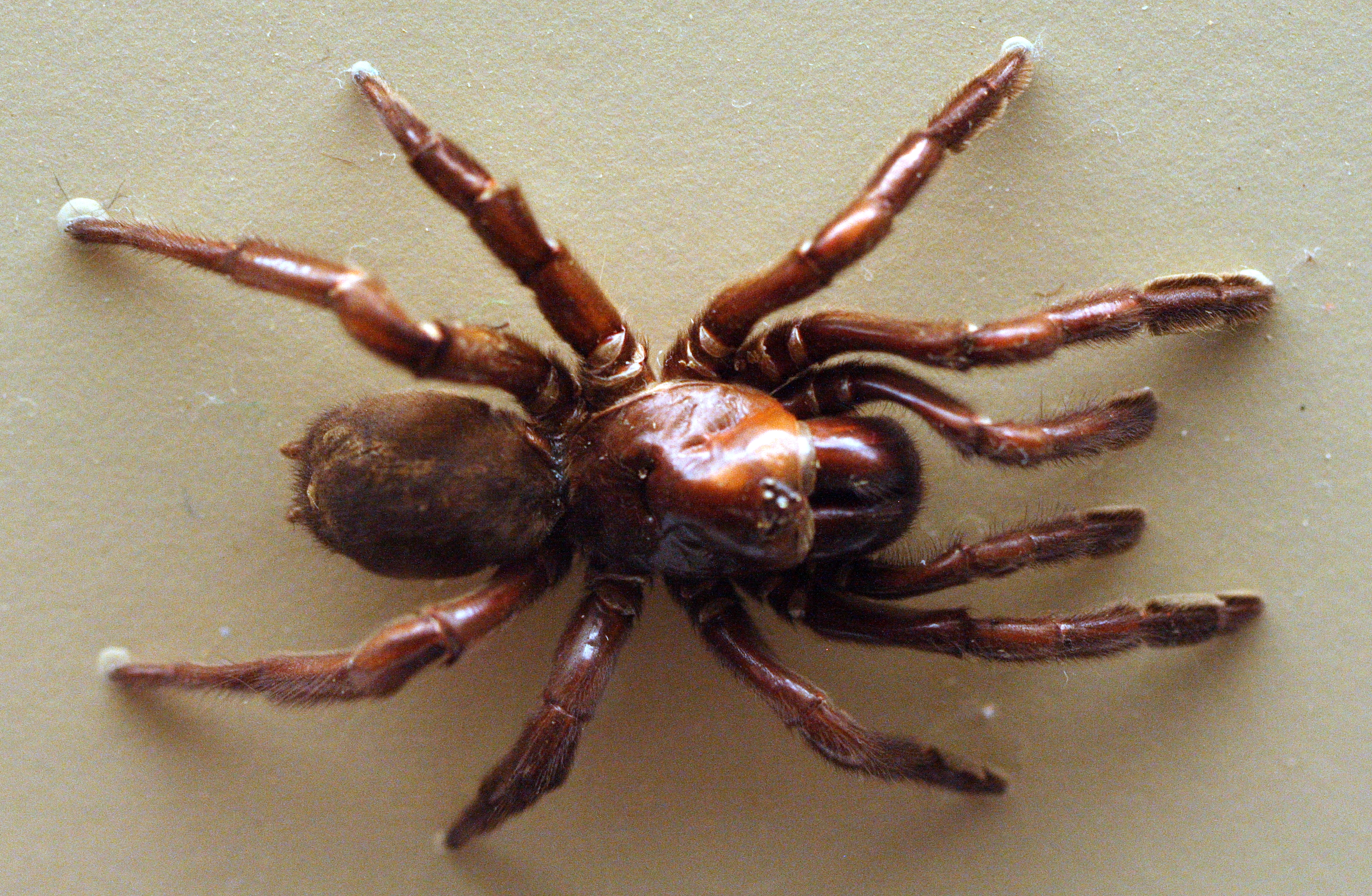
Gaius villosus

Gaius Rainbow, 1914

- G. aurora Rix, Raven & Harvey, 2018 — Australia (Western Australia)
- G. austini Rix, Raven & Harvey, 2018 — Australia (Western Australia)
- G. cooperi Rix, Raven & Harvey, 2018 — Australia (Western Australia)
- G. hueyi Rix, Raven & Harvey, 2018 — Australia (Western Australia)
- G. humphreysi Rix, Raven & Harvey, 2018 — Australia (Western Australia)
- G. mainae Rix, Raven & Harvey, 2018 — Australia (Western Australia)
- G. tealei Rix, Raven & Harvey, 2018 — Australia (Western Australia)
- G. villosus Rainbow, 1914 (type) — Australia (Western Australia)

=== Galeosoma ===
Galeosoma Purcell, 1903

- G. coronatum Hewitt, 1915 — South Africa
  - G. c. sphaeroideum Hewitt, 1919 — South Africa
- G. crinitum Hewitt, 1919 — South Africa
- G. hirsutum Hewitt, 1916 — South Africa
- G. mossambicum Hewitt, 1919 — Mozambique
- G. pallidum Hewitt, 1915 — South Africa
  - G. p. pilosum Hewitt, 1916 — South Africa
- G. planiscutatum Hewitt, 1919 — South Africa
- G. pluripunctatum Hewitt, 1919 — South Africa
- G. robertsi Hewitt, 1916 — South Africa
- G. schreineri Hewitt, 1913 — South Africa
- G. scutatum Purcell, 1903 (type) — South Africa
- G. vandami Hewitt, 1915 — South Africa
  - G. v. circumjunctum Hewitt, 1919 — South Africa
- G. vernayi Hewitt, 1935 — Botswana

=== Genysa ===
Genysa Simon, 1889

- G. bicalcarata Simon, 1889 (type) — Madagascar
- G. decorsei (Simon, 1902) — Madagascar
- G. decorsei (Simon, 1902) — Madagascar

=== Gorgyrella ===
Gorgyrella

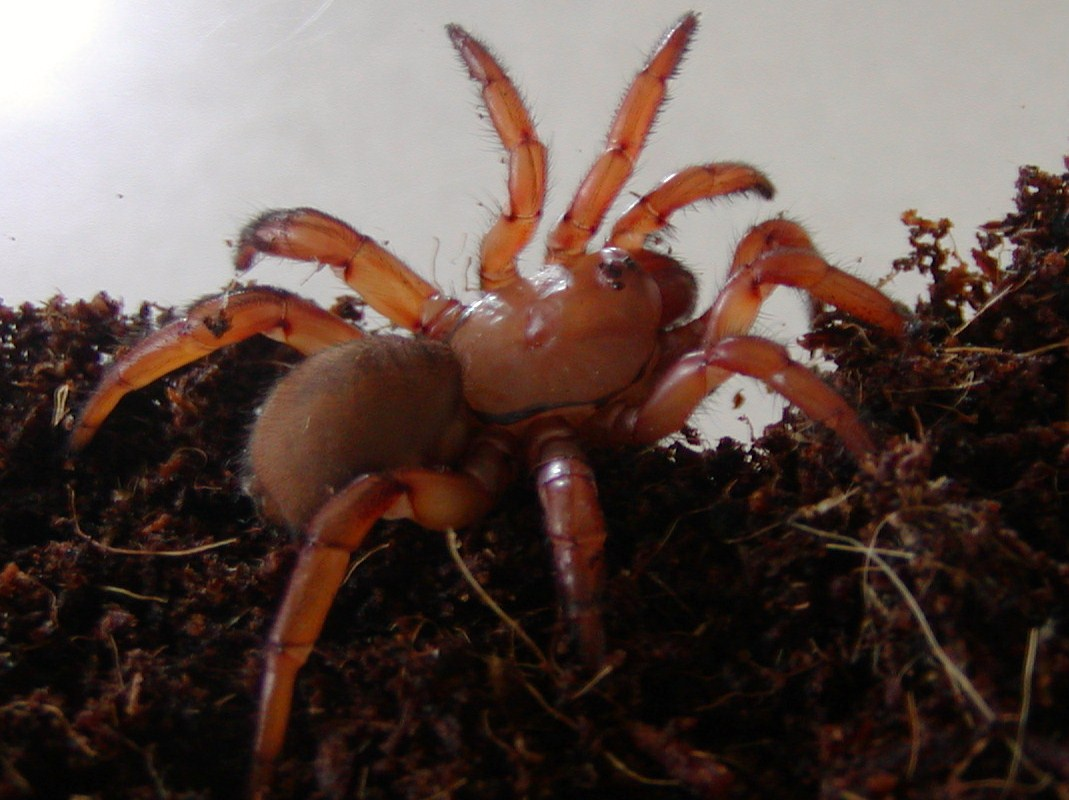
African red trapdoor spider
(Gorgyrella sp.)

Gorgyrella Purcell, 1902

- G. hirschhorni (Hewitt, 1919) — Zimbabwe
- G. inermis Tucker, 1917 — Tanzania
- G. namaquensis Purcell, 1902 (type) — South Africa
- G. schreineri Purcell, 1903 — South Africa
  - G. s. minor (Hewitt, 1916) — South Africa

== H ==
=== Heligmomerus ===
Heligmomerus Simon, 1892

- H. astutus (Hewitt, 1915) — South Africa
- H. barkudensis (Gravely, 1921) — India
- H. biharicus (Gravely, 1915) — India
- H. caffer Purcell, 1903 — South Africa
- H. carsoni Pocock, 1897 — Tanzania
- H. deserti Pocock, 1901 — Botswana
- H. garoensis (Tikader, 1977) — India
- H. jeanneli Berland, 1914 — East Africa
- H. maximus Sanap & Mirza, 2015 — India
- H. prostans Simon, 1892 — India
- H. somalicus Pocock, 1896 — Somalia
- H. taprobanicus Simon, 1892 (type) — Sri Lanka
- H. wii Siliwal, Hippargi, Yadav & Kumar, 2020 — India

=== Hiboka ===
Hiboka Fage, 1922

- H. geayi Fage, 1922 (type) — Madagascar

== I ==
=== Idiops ===
Idiops

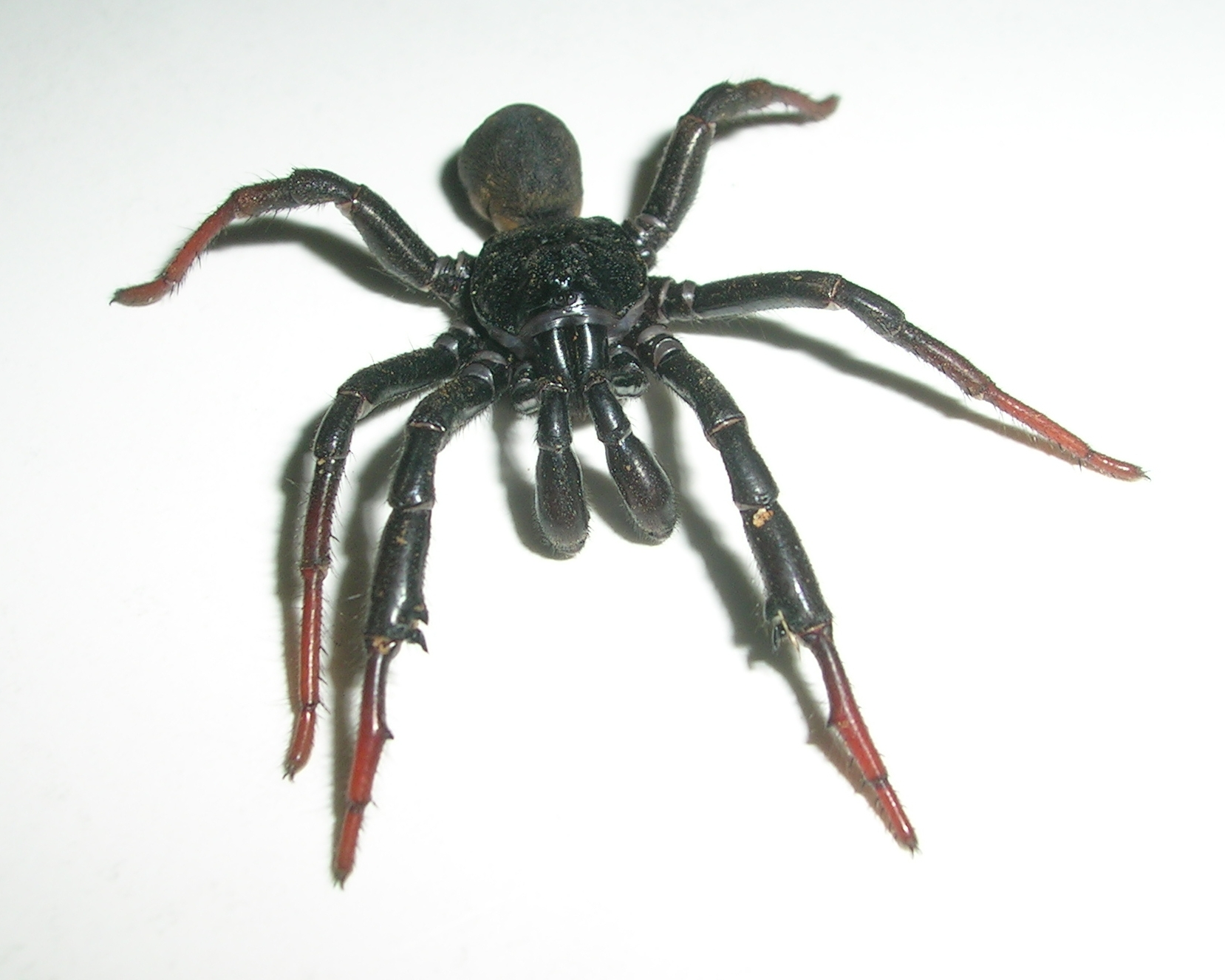
Idiops constructor

Idiops Perty, 1833

- I. angusticeps (Pocock, 1900) — West Africa
- I. argus Simon, 1889 — Venezuela
- I. arnoldi Hewitt, 1914 — South Africa
- I. aussereri Simon, 1876 — Congo
- I. bombayensis Siliwal, Molur & Biswas, 2005 — India
- I. bonapartei Hasselt, 1888 — Suriname
- I. bonny Siliwal, Hippargi, Yadav & Kumar, 2020 — India
- I. cambridgei Ausserer, 1875 — Colombia
- I. camelus (Mello-Leitão, 1937) — Brazil
- I. carajas Fonseca-Ferreira, Zampaulo & Guadanucci, 2017 — Brazil
- I. castaneus Hewitt, 1913 — South Africa
- I. clarus (Mello-Leitão, 1946) — Argentina, Uruguay
- I. crassus Simon, 1884 — Myanmar
- I. crudeni (Hewitt, 1914) — South Africa
- I. curvicalcar Roewer, 1953 — Congo
- I. curvipes (Thorell, 1899) — Cameroon
- I. damarensis Hewitt, 1934 — Namibia
- I. designatus O. Pickard-Cambridge, 1885 — India
- I. duocordibus (Fonseca-Ferreira, Guadanucci & Brescovit, 2021) — Brazil
- I. fageli Roewer, 1953 — Congo
- I. flaveolus (Pocock, 1901) — South Africa
- I. fossor (Pocock, 1900) — India
- I. fryi (Purcell, 1903) — South Africa
- I. fuscus Perty, 1833 (type) — Brazil
- I. gerhardti Hewitt, 1913 — South Africa
- I. germaini Simon, 1892 — Brazil
- I. gracilipes (Hewitt, 1919) — South Africa
- I. grandis (Hewitt, 1915) — South Africa
- I. gunningi Hewitt, 1913 — South Africa
  - I. g. elongatus Hewitt, 1915 — South Africa
- I. guri (Fonseca-Ferreira, Guadanucci & Brescovit, 2021) — Brazil
- I. hamiltoni (Pocock, 1902) — South Africa
- I. harti (Pocock, 1893) — St. Vincent
- I. hepburni (Hewitt, 1919) — South Africa, Lesotho
- I. hirsutipedis Mello-Leitão, 1941 — Argentina
- I. hirsutus (Hewitt, 1919) — South Africa
- I. joida Gupta, Das & Siliwal, 2013 — India
- I. kaasensis Mirza, Vaze & Sanap, 2012 — India
- I. kanonganus Roewer, 1953 — Congo
- I. kaperonis Roewer, 1953 — Congo
- I. kazibius Roewer, 1953 — Congo
- I. kentanicus (Purcell, 1903) — South Africa
- I. lacustris (Pocock, 1897) — Tanzania
- I. lusingius Roewer, 1953 — Congo
- I. madrasensis (Tikader, 1977) — India
- I. mafae Lawrence, 1927 — Namibia
- I. meadei O. Pickard-Cambridge, 1870 — Uganda
- I. medini Pratihar & Das, 2020 — India
- I. mettupalayam Ganeshkumar & Siliwal, 2013 — India
- I. microps (Hewitt, 1913) — South Africa
- I. minguito Ferretti, 2017 — Argentina
- I. mocambo (Fonseca-Ferreira, Guadanucci & Brescovit, 2021) — Brazil
- I. monticola (Hewitt, 1916) — South Africa
- I. monticoloides (Hewitt, 1919) — South Africa
- I. mossambicus (Hewitt, 1919) — Mozambique
- I. munois Roewer, 1953 — Congo
- I. neglectus L. Koch, 1875 — Unknown
- I. nigropilosus (Hewitt, 1919) — South Africa
- I. nilagiri Das & Diksha, 2019 — India
- I. nilopolensis (Mello-Leitão, 1923) — Brazil
- I. ochreolus (Pocock, 1902) — South Africa
- I. opifex (Simon, 1889) — French Guiana
- I. oriya Siliwal, 2013 — India
- I. palapyi Tucker, 1917 — Botswana
- I. pallidipes Purcell, 1908 — Namibia
- I. parvus Hewitt, 1915 — South Africa
- I. petiti (Guérin, 1838) — Brazil
- I. piluso Ferretti, Nime & Mattoni, 2017 — Argentina
- I. pirassununguensis Fukami & Lucas, 2005 — Brazil
- I. prescotti Schenkel, 1937 — Tanzania
- I. pretoriae (Pocock, 1898) — South Africa
- I. pulcher Hewitt, 1914 — South Africa
- I. pulloides Hewitt, 1919 — South Africa
- I. pullus Tucker, 1917 — South Africa
- I. pungwensis Purcell, 1904 — South Africa
- I. pylorus Schwendinger, 1991 — Thailand
- I. rastratus (O. Pickard-Cambridge, 1889) — Brazil
- I. reshma Siliwal, Hippargi, Yadav & Kumar, 2020 — India
- I. robustus (Pocock, 1898) — East Africa
- I. rohdei Karsch, 1886 — Paraguay
- I. royi Roewer, 1961 — Senegal
- I. rubrolimbatus Mirza & Sanap, 2012 — India
- I. sally Siliwal, Hippargi, Yadav & Kumar, 2020 — India
- I. santaremius (F. O. Pickard-Cambridge, 1896) — Brazil
- I. schenkeli Lessert, 1938 — Congo
- I. siolii (Bücherl, 1953) — Brazil
- I. straeleni Roewer, 1953 — Congo
- I. striatipes Purcell, 1908 — Botswana
- I. sylvestris (Hewitt, 1925) — South Africa
- I. syriacus O. Pickard-Cambridge, 1870 — Syria, Israel
- I. thorelli O. Pickard-Cambridge, 1870 — South Africa
- I. tolengo Ferretti, 2017 — Argentina
- I. upembensis Roewer, 1953 — Congo
- I. vandami (Hewitt, 1925) — South Africa
- I. vankhede Siliwal, Hippargi, Yadav & Kumar, 2020 — India
- I. versicolor (Purcell, 1903) — South Africa
- I. wittei Roewer, 1953 — Congo
- I. yemenensis Simon, 1890 — Yemen

=== Idiosoma ===
Idiosoma

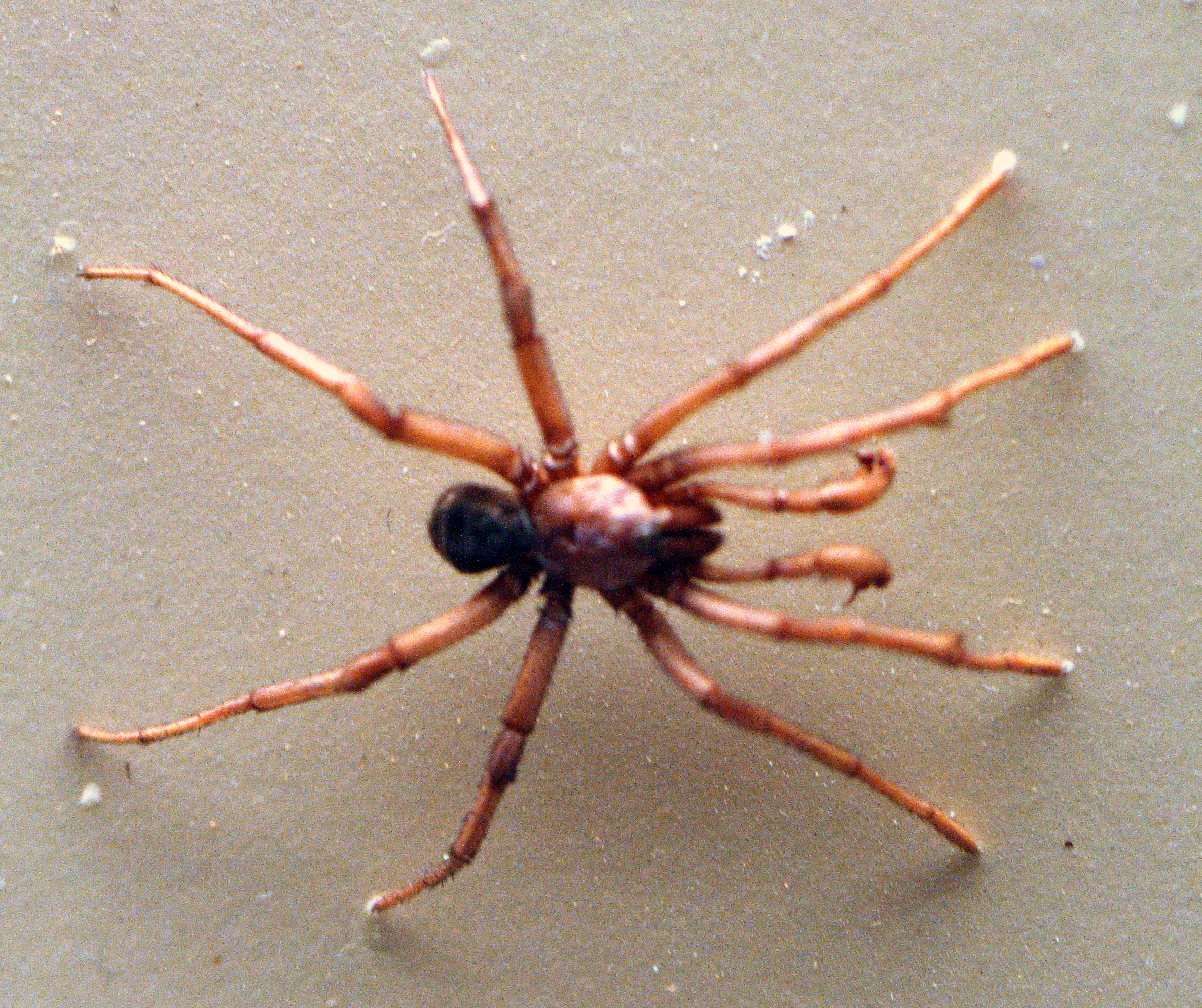
Idiosoma planites

Idiosoma Ausserer, 1871

- I. arenaceum Rix & Harvey, 2018 — Australia (Western Australia)
- I. berlandi (Rainbow, 1914) — Australia (New South Wales)
- I. castellum (Main, 1986) — Australia (Western Australia)
- I. clypeatum Rix & Harvey, 2018 — Australia (Western Australia)
- I. corrugatum Rix & Harvey, 2018 — Australia (South Australia)
- I. cupulifex (Main, 1957) — Australia (Western Australia)
- I. dandaragan Rix & Harvey, 2018 — Australia (Western Australia)
- I. formosum Rix & Harvey, 2018 — Australia (Western Australia)
- I. galeosomoides Rix, Main, Raven & Harvey, 2017 — Australia (Western Australia)
- I. gardneri Rix & Harvey, 2018 — Australia (Western Australia)
- I. gutharuka Rix & Harvey, 2018 — Australia (Western Australia)
- I. incomptum Rix & Harvey, 2018 — Australia (Western Australia)
- I. intermedium Rix & Harvey, 2018 — Australia (Western Australia)
- I. jarrah Rix & Harvey, 2018 — Australia (Western Australia)
- I. kopejtkaorum Rix & Harvey, 2018 — Australia (Western Australia)
- I. kwongan Rix & Harvey, 2018 — Australia (Western Australia)
- I. manstridgei (Pocock, 1897) — Australia (Western Australia)
- I. mcclementsorum Rix & Harvey, 2018 — Australia (Western Australia)
- I. mcnamarai Rix & Harvey, 2018 — Australia (Western Australia)
- I. montanum (Faulder, 1985) — Australia (New South Wales)
- I. nigrum Main, 1952 — Australia (Western Australia)
- I. occidentale (Hogg, 1903) — Australia (Western Australia, South Australia)
- I. planites (Faulder, 1985) — Australia (New South Wales)
- I. rhaphiduca (Rainbow & Pulleine, 1918) — Australia (Western Australia)
- I. schoknechtorum Rix & Harvey, 2018 — Australia (Western Australia)
- I. sigillatum (O. Pickard-Cambridge, 1870) (type) — Australia (Western Australia)
- I. smeatoni (Hogg, 1902) — Australia (South Australia)
- I. subtriste (O. Pickard-Cambridge, 1877) — Australia (South Australia)
- I. winsori (Faulder, 1985) — Australia (Victoria)

== N ==
=== Neocteniza ===
Neocteniza Pocock, 1895

- N. agustinea Miranda & Arizala, 2013 — Panama
- N. australis Goloboff, 1987 — Brazil, Argentina
- N. chancani Goloboff & Platnick, 1992 — Argentina
- N. coylei Goloboff & Platnick, 1992 — Peru
- N. fantastica Platnick & Shadab, 1976 — Colombia
- N. malkini Platnick & Shadab, 1981 — Ecuador
- N. mexicana F. O. Pickard-Cambridge, 1897 — Guatemala
- N. minima Goloboff, 1987 — Bolivia, Argentina
- N. myriamae Bertani, Fukushima & Nagahama, 2006 — Brazil
- N. occulta Platnick & Shadab, 1981 — Panama
- N. osa Platnick & Shadab, 1976 — Costa Rica
- N. paucispina Platnick & Shadab, 1976 — Guatemala
- N. platnicki Goloboff, 1987 — Paraguay
- N. pococki Platnick & Shadab, 1976 — Venezuela
- N. sclateri Pocock, 1895 (type) — Guyana
- N. spinosa Goloboff, 1987 — Argentina
- N. subirana Platnick & Shadab, 1976 — Honduras
- N. toba Goloboff, 1987 — Paraguay, Argentina

== P ==
=== Prothemenops ===
Prothemenops Schwendinger, 1991

- P. irineae Schwendinger & Hongpadharakiree, 2014 — Thailand
- P. khirikhan Schwendinger & Hongpadharakiree, 2014 — Thailand
- P. phanthurat Schwendinger & Hongpadharakiree, 2014 — Thailand
- P. siamensis Schwendinger, 1991 (type) — Thailand

== S ==
=== Scalidognathus ===
Scalidognathus Karsch, 1892

- S. montanus (Pocock, 1900) — India
- S. nigriaraneus Sanap & Mirza, 2011 — India
- S. oreophilus Simon, 1892 — Sri Lanka
- S. radialis (O. Pickard-Cambridge, 1869) (type) — Sri Lanka
- S. seticeps Karsch, 1892 — Sri Lanka
- S. tigerinus Sanap & Mirza, 2011 — India

=== Segregara ===
Segregara

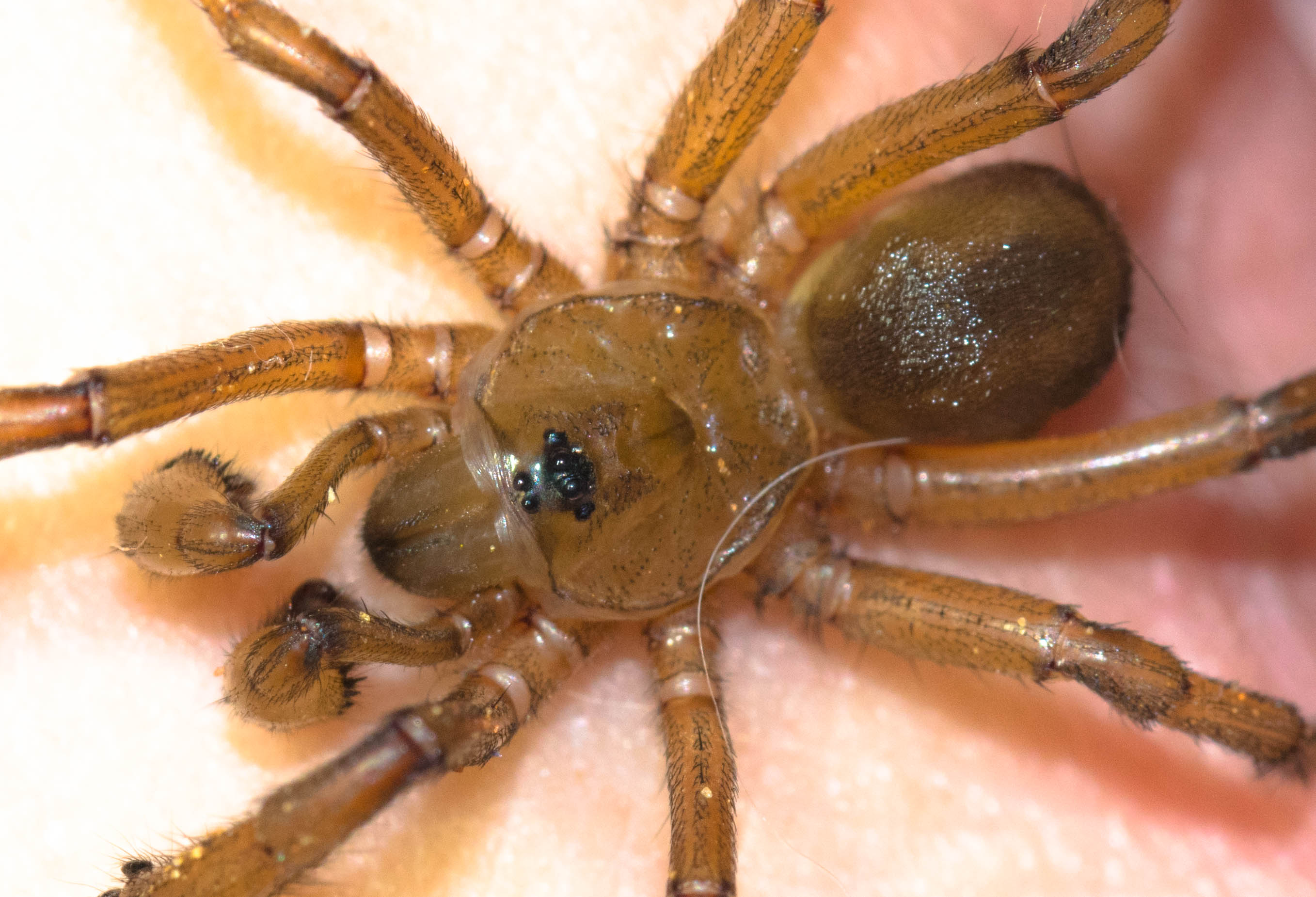
Spurred trapdoor spider
(Segregara sp.)

Segregara Tucker, 1917

- S. abrahami (Hewitt, 1913) — South Africa
- S. paucispinulosa (Hewitt, 1915) — South Africa
- S. transvaalensis (Hewitt, 1913) (type) — South Africa

== T ==
=== Titanidiops ===
Titanidiops Simon, 1903

- Titanidiops briodae (Schenkel, 1937) — Zimbabwe
- Titanidiops canariensis Wunderlich, 1992 — Canary Is.
- Titanidiops compactus (Gerstaecker, 1873) (type) — East Africa
- Titanidiops constructor (Pocock, 1900) — India
- Titanidiops fortis (Pocock, 1900) — India
- Titanidiops lacustris (Pocock, 1897) — Tanzania
- Titanidiops maroccanus Simon, 1909 — Morocco
- Titanidiops melloleitaoi (Caporiacco, 1949) — Kenya
- Titanidiops syriacus (O. Pickard-Cambridge, 1870) — Syria, Israel
