= Arbanitis maculosus =

Scientific classification
- Domain: Eukaryota
- Kingdom: Animalia
- Phylum: Arthropoda
- Subphylum: Chelicerata
- Class: Arachnida
- Order: Araneae
- Infraorder: Mygalomorphae
- Family: Idiopidae
- Genus: Arbanitis
- Species: A. maculosus

Binomial name
- Arbanitis maculosus (Rainbow & Pulleine, 1918)

Synonyms
- Misgolas maculosus (Rainbow & Pulleine, 1918); Dyarcyops maculosus Rainbow & Pulleine, 1918

Species of spider

Arbanitis maculosus is a species of armoured trap-door spider in the family Idiopidae, and is endemic to New South Wales.

It was first described by William Joseph Rainbow and Robert Henry Pulleine in 1918 as Dyarcyops maculosus, but was transferred to the genus, Misgolas, in 2006 by Wishart and then in 2017 Michael Rix and others transferred it to the genus, Arbanitis.
