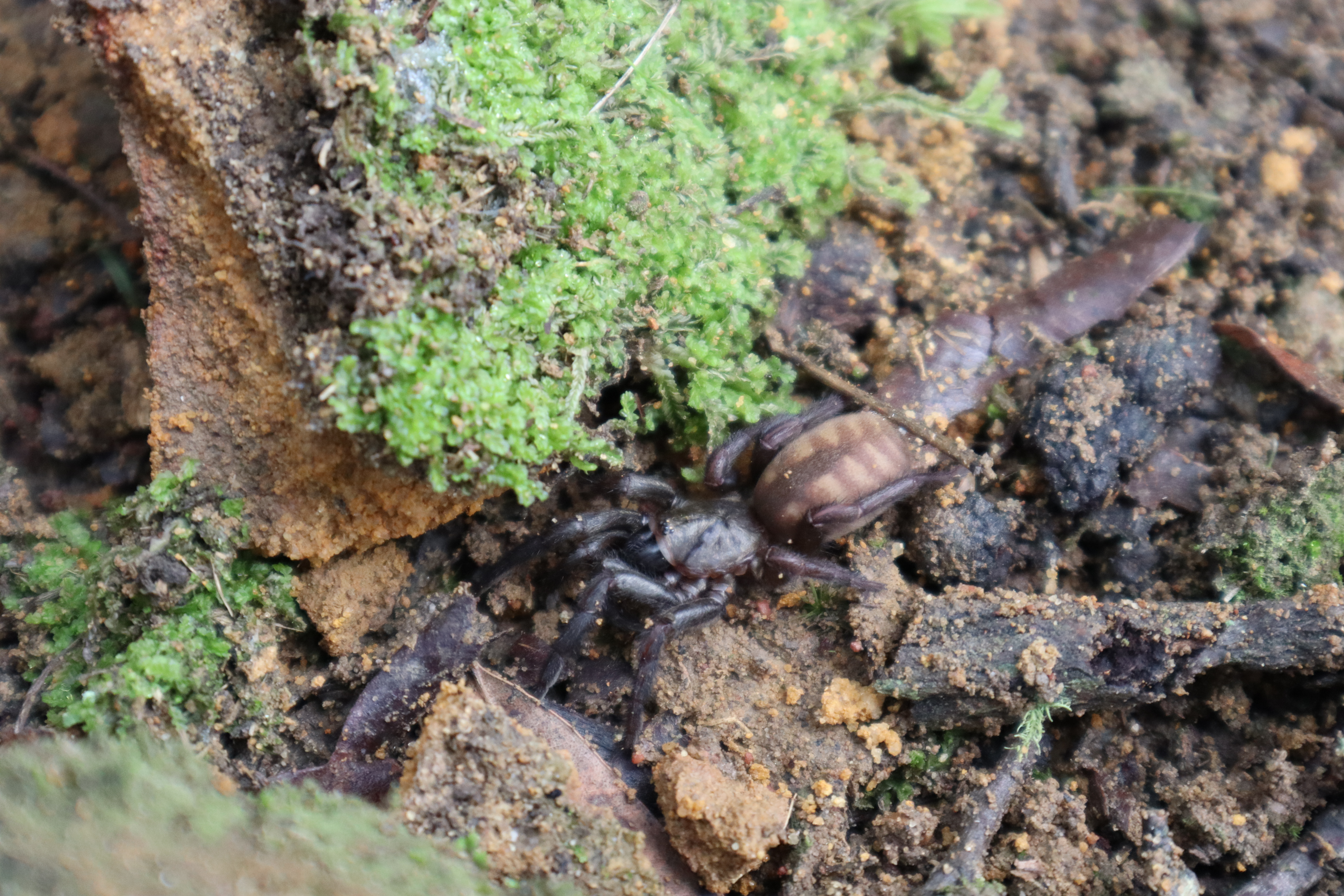
- Female

Scientific classification
- Kingdom: Animalia
- Phylum: Arthropoda
- Subphylum: Chelicerata
- Class: Arachnida
- Order: Araneae
- Infraorder: Mygalomorphae
- Family: Idiopidae
- Genus: Arbanitis
- Species: A. gracilis

Binomial name
- Arbanitis gracilis Rainbow & Pulleine, 1918

Synonyms
- Misgolas gracilis (Rainbow & Pulleine, 1918)

= Arbanitis gracilis =

Species of spider

Arbanitis gracilis, also known as the silver-haired trapdoor spider, is a species of mygalomorph spider in the Idiopidae family. It is endemic to Australia. It was described in 1918 by Australian arachnologists William Joseph Rainbow and Robert Henry Pulleine.

== Distribution and habitat ==
The species occurs in eastern New South Wales, including the Sydney Basin, westwards to the Blue Mountains in open forest habitats, mainly on Hawkesbury Sandstone substrates. The type locality is the Domain in the city of Sydney.

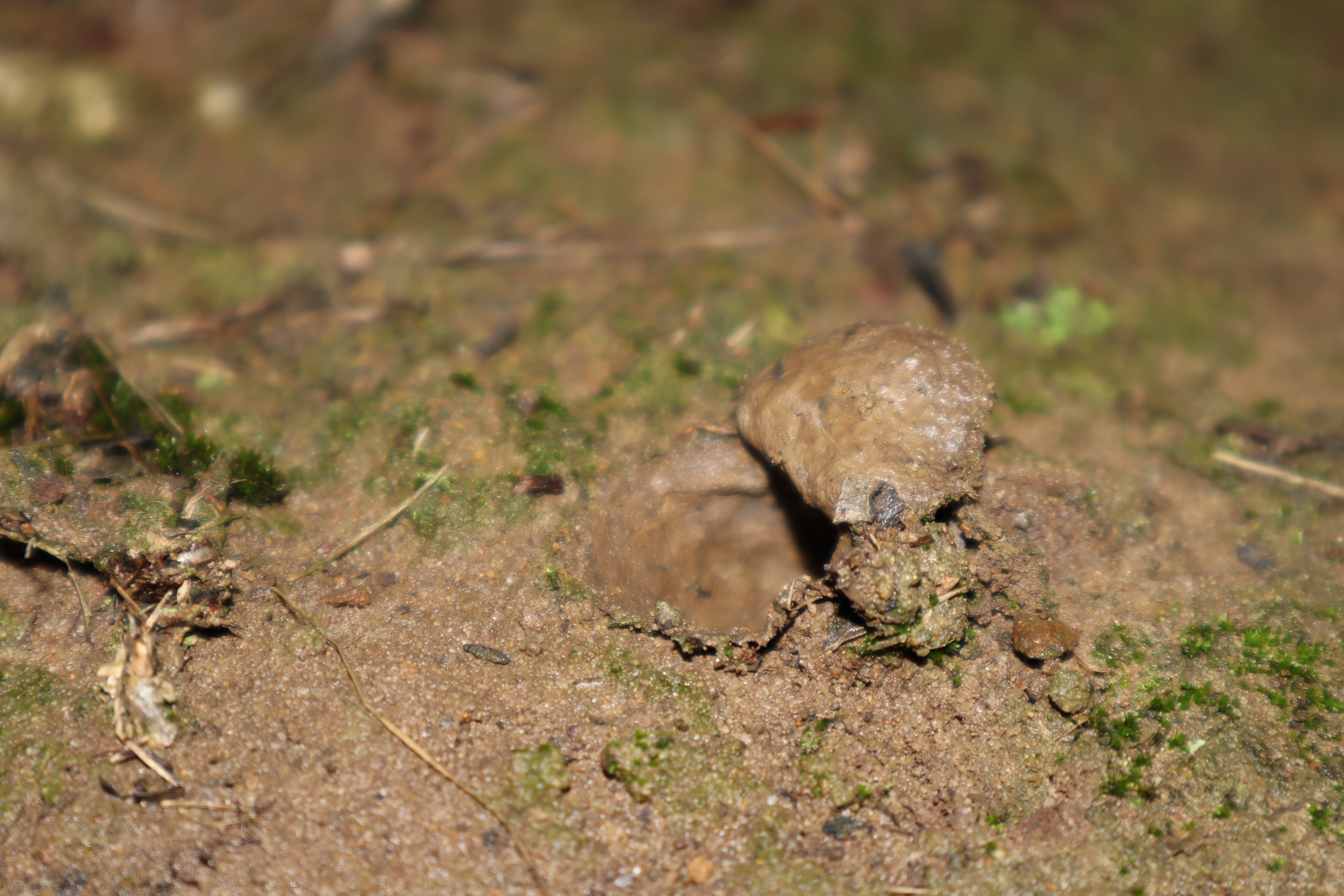
Burrow with trapdoor open

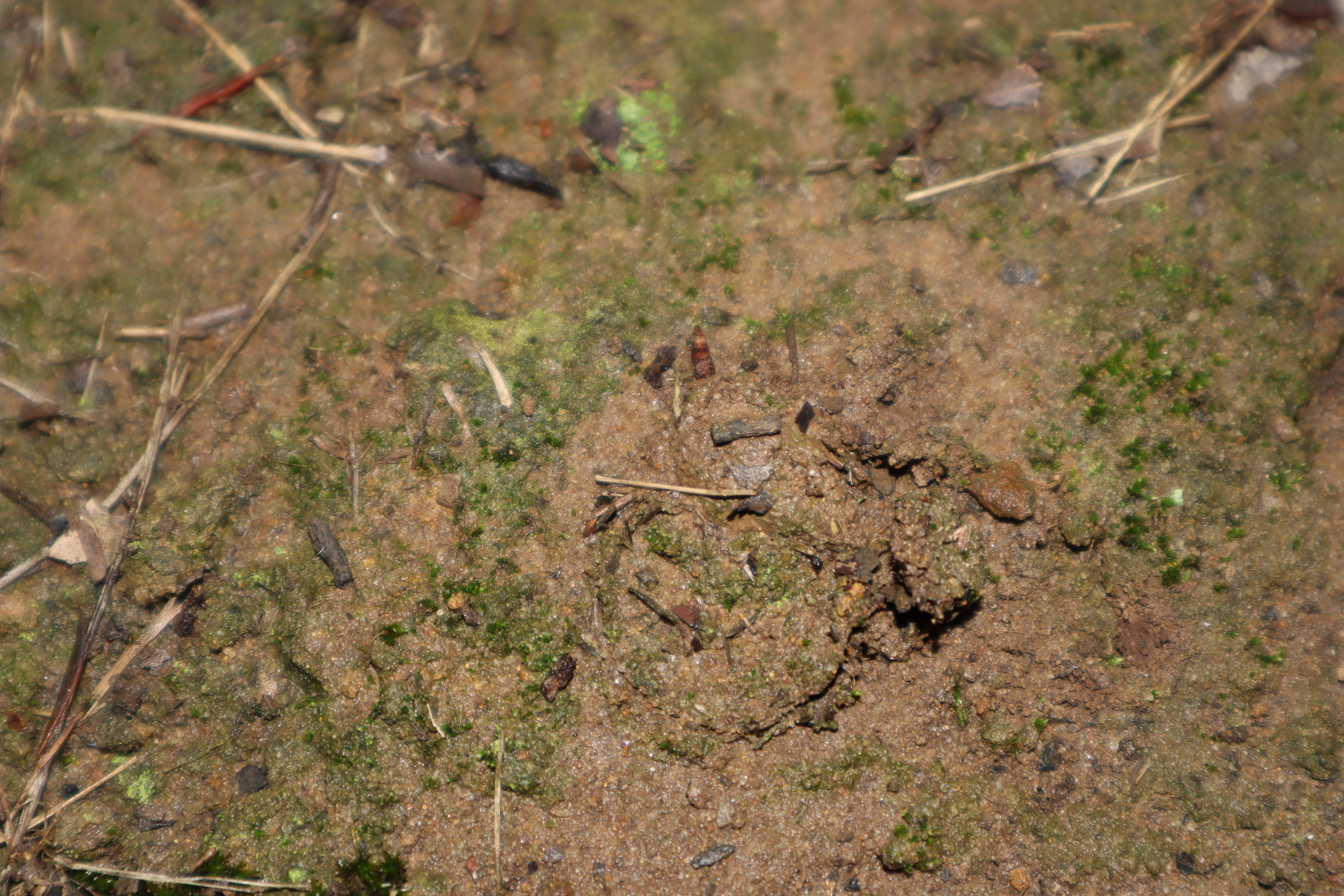
Burrow with trapdoor closed

== Behaviour ==
The spiders are fossorial, terrestrial predators. The burrow is constructed in friable soil with a thin trapdoor.
