= Euoplos similaris =

Scientific classification
- Kingdom: Animalia
- Phylum: Arthropoda
- Subphylum: Chelicerata
- Class: Arachnida
- Order: Araneae
- Infraorder: Mygalomorphae
- Family: Idiopidae
- Genus: Euoplos
- Species: E. similaris

Binomial name
- Euoplos similaris (Rainbow & Pulleine, 1918)

Synonyms
- Arbanitis similaris Rainbow & Pulleine, 1918

Species of spider

Euoplos similaris, also known as the banded golden trapdoor spider, is a species of mygalomorph spider in the Idiopidae family. It is endemic to Australia. It was described in 1918 by Australian arachnologists William Joseph Rainbow and Robert Henry Pulleine.

== Distribution and habitat ==
The species occurs in south-eastern Queensland in open forest habitats. The type locality is Kedron Brook in the northern suburbs of Brisbane.

== Behaviour ==
The spiders are fossorial, terrestrial predators. They construct burrows in creek banks with thick, plug-like trapdoors.
