= Arbanitis papillosus =

Scientific classification
- Kingdom: Animalia
- Phylum: Arthropoda
- Subphylum: Chelicerata
- Class: Arachnida
- Order: Araneae
- Infraorder: Mygalomorphae
- Family: Idiopidae
- Genus: Arbanitis
- Species: A. papillosus

Binomial name
- Arbanitis papillosus (Rainbow & Pulleine, 1918)

Synonyms
- Misgolas papillosus (Rainbow & Pulleine, 1918)

Species of spider

Arbanitis papillosus is a species of mygalomorph spider in the Idiopidae family. It is endemic to Australia. It was described in 1918 by Australian arachnologists William Joseph Rainbow and Robert Henry Pulleine.

== Distribution and habitat ==
The species occurs in south-east Queensland in closed forest habitats. The type locality is Tamborine Mountain, in the Scenic Rim Region.

== Behaviour ==
The spiders are fossorial, terrestrial predators.
