= Arbanitis melancholicus =

Scientific classification
- Domain: Eukaryota
- Kingdom: Animalia
- Phylum: Arthropoda
- Subphylum: Chelicerata
- Class: Arachnida
- Order: Araneae
- Infraorder: Mygalomorphae
- Family: Idiopidae
- Genus: Arbanitis
- Species: A. melancholicus

Binomial name
- Arbanitis melancholicus Rainbow & Pulleine, 1918

Synonyms
- Dyarcyops melancholicus Rainbow & Pulleine, 1918; Misgolas melancholicus (Rainbow & Pulleine, 1918)

Species of spider

Arbanitis melancholicus is a species of armoured trap-door spider in the family Idiopidae, and is endemic to New South Wales.

It was first described by William Joseph Rainbow and Robert Henry Pulleine in 1918 as Dyarcyops melancholicus. However, in 1985 Barbara Main placed it in synonymy with Misgolas rapax In 2006, Wishart recognised it once more as a separate species and it became Misgolas melancholicus. This was reconfirmed by Wishart in 2011. In 2017 Michael Rix and others returned it to the genus, Arbanitis.
