= Idiosoma rhaphiduca =

Scientific classification
- Kingdom: Animalia
- Phylum: Arthropoda
- Subphylum: Chelicerata
- Class: Arachnida
- Order: Araneae
- Infraorder: Mygalomorphae
- Family: Idiopidae
- Genus: Idiosoma
- Species: I. rhaphiduca

Binomial name
- Idiosoma rhaphiduca (Rainbow & Pulleine, 1918)

Synonyms
- Aganippe rhaphiduca Rainbow & Pulleine, 1918

Species of spider

Idiosoma rhaphiduca is a species of mygalomorph spider in the Idiopidae family. It is endemic to Australia. It was described in 1918 by Australian arachnologists William Joseph Rainbow and Robert Henry Pulleine.

== Distribution and habitat ==
The species occurs in south-west Western Australia in open forest habitats, from the valleys of the Darling Scarp southwards to Bunbury and south-eastwards to Albany. The type locality is Kings Park in Perth.

== Behaviour ==
The spiders are fossorial, terrestrial predators. They construct burrows with trapdoors in wet creek banks, the flood flats of watercourses and on patches of open ground in clay soils.
