= Arbanitis hirsutus =

Scientific classification
- Domain: Eukaryota
- Kingdom: Animalia
- Phylum: Arthropoda
- Subphylum: Chelicerata
- Class: Arachnida
- Order: Araneae
- Infraorder: Mygalomorphae
- Family: Idiopidae
- Genus: Arbanitis
- Species: A. hirsutus

Binomial name
- Arbanitis hirsutus Rainbow & Pulleine, 1918

Synonyms
- Misgolas hirsutus (Rainbow & Pulleine, 1918); Dyarcyops hirsutus (Rainbow & Pulleine, 1918)

Species of spider

Arbanitis hirsutus is a species of armoured trap-door spider in the family Idiopidae, and is endemic to New South Wales and Queensland.

It was first described by William Joseph Rainbow and Robert Henry Pulleine in 1918 as Arbanitis hirsutus, but was transferred to the genus, Dyarcyops, in 1977 by Barbara Main and then in 2017 Michael Rix and others returned it to the genus, Arbanitis.
