= Arbanitis montanus =

Scientific classification
- Domain: Eukaryota
- Kingdom: Animalia
- Phylum: Arthropoda
- Subphylum: Chelicerata
- Class: Arachnida
- Order: Araneae
- Infraorder: Mygalomorphae
- Family: Idiopidae
- Genus: Arbanitis
- Species: A. montanus

Binomial name
- Arbanitis montanus Rainbow & Pulleine, 1918

Synonyms
- Misgolas montanus (Rainbow & Pulleine, 1918)

Species of spider

Arbanitis montanus is a species of armoured trap-door spider in the family Idiopidae, and is endemic to New South Wales.

It was first described by William Joseph Rainbow and Robert Henry Pulleine in 1918 as Arbanitis montanus. However, in 1977 Barbara Main placed it in synonymy with Dyarcyops fuscipes and in 1985 in synonymy with Misgolas rapax. In 2008, Wishart and Rowell recognised it once more as a separate species and it became Misgolas montanus. This was reconfirmed by Wishart in 2011. In 2017 Michael Rix and others returned it to the genus, Arbanitis.
