= Idiosoma berlandi =

Scientific classification
- Kingdom: Animalia
- Phylum: Arthropoda
- Subphylum: Chelicerata
- Class: Arachnida
- Order: Araneae
- Infraorder: Mygalomorphae
- Family: Idiopidae
- Genus: Idiosoma
- Species: I. berlandi

Binomial name
- Idiosoma berlandi (Rainbow, 1914)

Synonyms
- Aganippe berlandi Rainbow, 1914

Species of spider

Idiosoma berlandi is a species of mygalomorph spider in the Idiopidae family. It is endemic to Australia. It was described in 1914 by Australian arachnologist William Joseph Rainbow. The specific epithet berlandi honours the author's “correspondents and co-workers M. and Mme. Berland”.

== Distribution and habitat ==
The species occurs in northern New South Wales in the southern Brigalow Belt. The type locality is Narrabri.

== Behaviour ==
The spiders are fossorial, terrestrial predators.
