= Arbanitis elegans =

Scientific classification
- Domain: Eukaryota
- Kingdom: Animalia
- Phylum: Arthropoda
- Subphylum: Chelicerata
- Class: Arachnida
- Order: Araneae
- Infraorder: Mygalomorphae
- Family: Idiopidae
- Genus: Arbanitis
- Species: A. elegans

Binomial name
- Arbanitis elegans Rainbow & Pulleine, 1918

Synonyms
- Misgolas elegans (Rainbow & Pulleine, 1918)

Species of spider

Arbanitis elegans is a species of spider in the family Idiopidae found in New South Wales, Australia.
