= Arbanitis villosus =

Scientific classification
- Domain: Eukaryota
- Kingdom: Animalia
- Phylum: Arthropoda
- Subphylum: Chelicerata
- Class: Arachnida
- Order: Araneae
- Infraorder: Mygalomorphae
- Family: Idiopidae
- Genus: Arbanitis
- Species: A. villosus

Binomial name
- Arbanitis villosus (Rainbow, 1914)

Synonyms
- Megalosara villosa Rainbow, 1914; Misgolas villosus (Rainbow, 1914)

Species of spider

Arbanitis villosus is a species of armoured trap-door spider in the family Idiopidae, and is endemic to New South Wales.

It was first described by William Joseph Rainbow in 1914 as Megalosara villosa. In 2006, Graham Wishart transferred it to the genus, Misgolas. In 2017, Michael Rix and others transferred it to the genus, Arbanitis.
