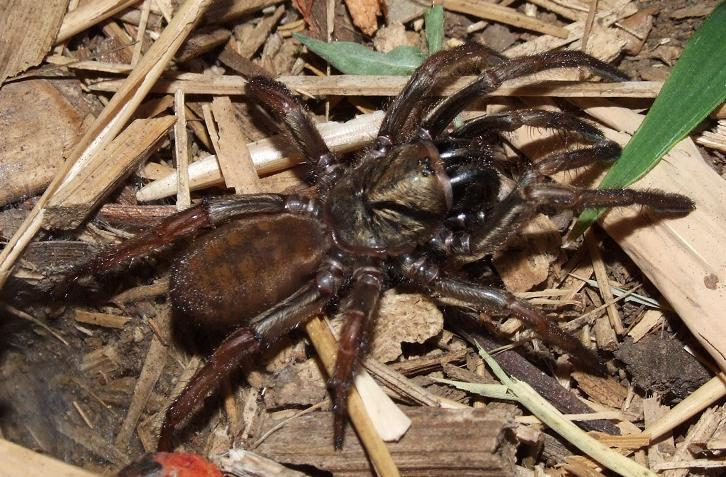
- A. rapax

Scientific classification
- Kingdom: Animalia
- Phylum: Arthropoda
- Subphylum: Chelicerata
- Class: Arachnida
- Order: Araneae
- Infraorder: Mygalomorphae
- Family: Idiopidae
- Genus: Arbanitis; L. Koch, 1874

Type species
- A. longipes (L. Koch, 1873)

Species
- 61, see text

Synonyms
- Dyarcyops Hogg, 1902; Hermeas Karsch, 1878; Megalosara Rainbow, 1914; Misgolas Karsch, 1878

= Arbanitis =

Genus of spiders

Arbanitis is a genus of Australian armoured trapdoor spiders that was first described by Ludwig Carl Christian Koch in 1874.

== Species ==
As of May 2019 the genus contained sixty-one species found in New South Wales (NSW), Queensland (QLD), South Australia (SA) or Tasmania (TAS):

- A. andrewsi (Hogg, 1902) – SA
- A. baehrae (Wishart & Rowell, 2008) – NSW
- A. beaury Raven & Wishart, 2006 – NSW
- A. beni (Wishart, 2006) – NSW
- A. billsheari (Wishart & Rowell, 2008) – NSW
- A. biroi (Kulczyński, 1908) – NSW
- A. bithongabel (Raven & Wishart, 2006) – QLD
- A. browningi (Wishart & Rowell, 2008) – NSW
- A. campbelli (Wishart & Rowell, 2008) – NSW
- A. cliffi (Wishart, 2006) – NSW
- A. crawfordorum (Wishart & Rowell, 2008) – NSW
- A. crispus (Karsch, 1878) – TAS
- A. davidwilsoni (Wishart & Rowell, 2008) – NSW
- A. dereki (Wishart, 1992) – NSW
- A. dougweiri (Wishart & Rowell, 2008) – NSW
- A. echo (Raven & Wishart, 2006) – NSW, QLD
- A. elegans Rainbow & Pulleine, 1918 – NSW
- A. fredcoylei (Wishart & Rowell, 2008) – NSW
- A. gracilis Rainbow & Pulleine, 1918 – NSW
- A. grayi (Wishart & Rowell, 2008) – NSW
- A. gwennethae (Wishart, 2011) – NSW
- A. helensmithae (Wishart & Rowell, 2008) – NSW
- A. hirsutus Rainbow & Pulleine, 1918 – QLD
- A. horsemanae (Wishart, 2011) – NSW
- A. kampenae (Wishart, 2011) – NSW
- A. kirstiae (Wishart, 1992) – NSW
- A. linklateri (Wishart & Rowell, 2008) – NSW
- A. longipes (L. Koch, 1873) (type) – NSW, QLD
- A. lynabra (Wishart, 2006) – NSW
- A. macei (Wishart & Rowell, 2008) – NSW
- A. maculosus (Rainbow & Pulleine, 1918) – NSW
- A. mascordi (Wishart, 1992) – NSW
- A. maxhicksi (Wishart & Rowell, 2008) – NSW
- A. melancholicus (Rainbow & Pulleine, 1918) – NSW
- A. michaeli (Wishart, 2006) – NSW
- A. milledgei (Wishart & Rowell, 2008) – NSW
- A. montanus Rainbow & Pulleine, 1918 – NSW
- A. monteithi (Raven & Wishart, 2006) – QLD
- A. mudfordae (Wishart & Rowell, 2008) – NSW
- A. ornatus (Rainbow, 1914) – QLD
- A. papillosus (Rainbow & Pulleine, 1918) – QLD
- A. paulaskewi (Wishart, 2011) – NSW
- A. phippsi (Wishart, 2011) – NSW
- A. rapax (Karsch, 1878) – NSW
- A. raveni (Wishart & Rowell, 2008) – NSW
- A. robertcollinsi Raven & Wishart, 2006 – QLD
- A. robertsi (Main & Mascord, 1974) – NSW
- A. rodi (Wishart, 2006) – NSW
- A. rowelli (Wishart, 2011) – NSW
- A. shawi (Wishart, 2011) – NSW
- A. sydjordanae (Wishart & Rowell, 2008) – NSW
- A. taiti (Wishart & Rowell, 2008) – NSW
- A. tannerae (Wishart, 2011) – NSW
- A. tarnawskiae (Wishart & Rowell, 2008) – NSW
- A. thompsonae (Wishart & Rowell, 2008) – NSW
- A. trangae (Wishart, 2006) – NSW
- A. villosus (Rainbow, 1914) – NSW
- A. watsonorum (Wishart & Rowell, 2008) – NSW
- A. wayorum (Wishart, 2006) – NSW
- A. weigelorum (Wishart & Rowell, 2008) – NSW
- A. yorkmainae (Wishart & Rowell, 2008) – NSW

== See also ==
- List of common Australian spiders
