= Arbanitis ornatus =

Scientific classification
- Domain: Eukaryota
- Kingdom: Animalia
- Phylum: Arthropoda
- Subphylum: Chelicerata
- Class: Arachnida
- Order: Araneae
- Infraorder: Mygalomorphae
- Family: Idiopidae
- Genus: Arbanitis
- Species: A. ornatus

Binomial name
- Arbanitis ornatus (Rainbow, 1914)

Synonyms
- Idioctis ornata Rainbow, 1914; Aganippe ornata Rainbow & Pulleine, 1918; Dyarcyops ornata (Rainbow, 1914); Misgolas ornatus (Rainbow, 1914)

Species of spider

Arbanitis ornatus is a species of armoured trap-door spider in the family Idiopidae, and is endemic to Queensland.

It was first described by William Joseph Rainbow in 1914 as Idioctis ornata. In 1977, Barbara Main transferred it to the genus, Dyarcyops. In 2017, Michael Rix and others transferred it to the genus, Arbanitis.
