= Arbanitis paulaskewi =

Scientific classification
- Domain: Eukaryota
- Kingdom: Animalia
- Phylum: Arthropoda
- Subphylum: Chelicerata
- Class: Arachnida
- Order: Araneae
- Infraorder: Mygalomorphae
- Family: Idiopidae
- Genus: Arbanitis
- Species: A. paulaskewi

Binomial name
- Arbanitis paulaskewi (Wishart, 2011)

Synonyms
- Misgolas paulaskewi Wishart, 2011

Species of spider

Arbanitis paulaskewi is a species of armoured trap-door spider in the family Idiopidae, and is endemic to New South Wales.

It was first described by Graham Wishart in 2011 as Misgolas paulaskewi, but was transferred to the genus, Arbanitis, by Michael Rix and others in 2017.
