= Arbanitis browningi =

Scientific classification
- Domain: Eukaryota
- Kingdom: Animalia
- Phylum: Arthropoda
- Subphylum: Chelicerata
- Class: Arachnida
- Order: Araneae
- Infraorder: Mygalomorphae
- Family: Idiopidae
- Genus: Arbanitis
- Species: A. browningi

Binomial name
- Arbanitis browningi (Wishart & Rowell 2008)

Synonyms
- Misgolas browningi Wishart & Rowell, 2008

Species of spider

Arbanitis browningi is a species of armoured trap-door spider in the family Idiopidae, and is endemic to New South Wales.

It was first described by Wishart and Rowell in 2008 as Misgolas browningi, but was transferred to the genus, Arbanitis, by Michael Rix and others in 2017.
