= Arbanitis rowelli =

Scientific classification
- Domain: Eukaryota
- Kingdom: Animalia
- Phylum: Arthropoda
- Subphylum: Chelicerata
- Class: Arachnida
- Order: Araneae
- Infraorder: Mygalomorphae
- Family: Idiopidae
- Genus: Arbanitis
- Species: A. rowelli

Binomial name
- Arbanitis rowelli (Wishart, 2011)

Synonyms
- Misgolas rowelli Wishart, 2011

Species of spider

Arbanitis rowelli is a species of armoured trap-door spider in the family Idiopidae, and is endemic to New South Wales.

It was first described by Graham Wishart in 2011 as Misgolas rowelli, but was transferred to the genus, Arbanitis, by Michael Rix and others in 2017.
