= Arbanitis weigelorum =

Scientific classification
- Domain: Eukaryota
- Kingdom: Animalia
- Phylum: Arthropoda
- Subphylum: Chelicerata
- Class: Arachnida
- Order: Araneae
- Infraorder: Mygalomorphae
- Family: Idiopidae
- Genus: Arbanitis
- Species: A. weigelorum

Binomial name
- Arbanitis weigelorum (Wishart & Rowell 2008)

Synonyms
- Misgolas weigelorum Wishart & Rowell, 2008

Species of spider

Arbanitis weigelorum is a species of armoured trap-door spider in the family Idiopidae, and is endemic to New South Wales.

It was first described by Wishart and Rowell in 2008 as Misgolas weigelorum, but was transferred to the genus, Arbanitis, by Michael Rix and others in 2017. The species epithet honours John & Robyn Weigel, proprietors of the Australian Reptile Park, a source of many spiders for the Australian Museum.

The species has been found in/near Gosford, N.S.W, and none of its burrows had been found at the time it was first described.
