= Arbanitis shawi =

Scientific classification
- Domain: Eukaryota
- Kingdom: Animalia
- Phylum: Arthropoda
- Subphylum: Chelicerata
- Class: Arachnida
- Order: Araneae
- Infraorder: Mygalomorphae
- Family: Idiopidae
- Genus: Arbanitis
- Species: A. shawi

Binomial name
- Arbanitis shawi (Wishart, 2011)

Synonyms
- Misgolas shawi Wishart, 2011

Species of spider

Arbanitis shawi is a species of armoured trap-door spider in the family Idiopidae, and is endemic to New South Wales.

It was first described by Graham Wishart in 2011 as Misgolas shawi, but was transferred to the genus, Arbanitis, by Michael Rix and others in 2017.
