= Arbanitis gwennethae =

Scientific classification
- Domain: Eukaryota
- Kingdom: Animalia
- Phylum: Arthropoda
- Subphylum: Chelicerata
- Class: Arachnida
- Order: Araneae
- Infraorder: Mygalomorphae
- Family: Idiopidae
- Genus: Arbanitis
- Species: A. gwennethae

Binomial name
- Arbanitis gwennethae (Wishart, 2011)

Synonyms
- Misgolas gwennethae Wishart, 2011

Species of spider

Arbanitis gwennethae is a species of armoured trap-door spider in the family Idiopidae, and is endemic to New South Wales.

It was first described by Graham Wishart in 2011 as Misgolas gwennethae, but was transferred to the genus, Arbanitis, by Michael Rix and others in 2017.
