= Arbanitis dereki =

Scientific classification
- Domain: Eukaryota
- Kingdom: Animalia
- Phylum: Arthropoda
- Subphylum: Chelicerata
- Class: Arachnida
- Order: Araneae
- Infraorder: Mygalomorphae
- Family: Idiopidae
- Genus: Arbanitis
- Species: A. dereki

Binomial name
- Arbanitis dereki (Wishart, 1992)

Synonyms
- Misgolas dereki Wishart, 1992

Species of spider

Arbanitis dereki is a species of armoured trap-door spider in the family Idiopidae, and is endemic to New South Wales.

It was first described by Graham Wishart in 2006 as Misgolas dereki, but was transferred to the genus, Arbanitis, by Michael Rix and others in 2017.
