= Arbanitis helensmithae =

Scientific classification
- Domain: Eukaryota
- Kingdom: Animalia
- Phylum: Arthropoda
- Subphylum: Chelicerata
- Class: Arachnida
- Order: Araneae
- Infraorder: Mygalomorphae
- Family: Idiopidae
- Genus: Arbanitis
- Species: A. helensmithae

Binomial name
- Arbanitis helensmithae (Wishart & Rowell 2008)

Synonyms
- Misgolas helensmithae Wishart & Rowell, 2008

Species of spider

Arbanitis helensmithae is a species of armoured trap-door spider in the family Idiopidae, and is endemic to New South Wales.

It was first described by Wishart and Rowell in 2008 as Misgolas helensmithae, but was transferred to the genus, Arbanitis, by Michael Rix and others in 2017.
