= Arbanitis robertcollinsi =

Scientific classification
- Domain: Eukaryota
- Kingdom: Animalia
- Phylum: Arthropoda
- Subphylum: Chelicerata
- Class: Arachnida
- Order: Araneae
- Infraorder: Mygalomorphae
- Family: Idiopidae
- Genus: Arbanitis
- Species: A. robertcollinsi

Binomial name
- Arbanitis robertcollinsi Raven & Wishart, 2006

Species of spider

Arbanitis robertcollinsi is a species of armoured trap-door spider in the family Idiopidae, and is endemic to Queensland, where it has been found only in Lamington National Park.

It was first described by Robert Raven & Graham Wishart in 2006.
