= Arbanitis dougweiri =

Scientific classification
- Domain: Eukaryota
- Kingdom: Animalia
- Phylum: Arthropoda
- Subphylum: Chelicerata
- Class: Arachnida
- Order: Araneae
- Infraorder: Mygalomorphae
- Family: Idiopidae
- Genus: Arbanitis
- Species: A. dougweiri

Binomial name
- Arbanitis dougweiri (Wishart & Rowell 2008)

Synonyms
- Misgolas dougweiri Wishart & Rowell, 2008

Species of spider

Arbanitis dougweiri is a species of armoured trap-door spider in the family Idiopidae, and is endemic to New South Wales.

It was first described by Wishart and Rowell in 2008 as Misgolas dougweiri, but was transferred to the genus, Arbanitis, by Michael Rix and others in 2017.
