= Arbanitis davidwilsoni =

Scientific classification
- Domain: Eukaryota
- Kingdom: Animalia
- Phylum: Arthropoda
- Subphylum: Chelicerata
- Class: Arachnida
- Order: Araneae
- Infraorder: Mygalomorphae
- Family: Idiopidae
- Genus: Arbanitis
- Species: A. davidwilsoni

Binomial name
- Arbanitis davidwilsoni (Wishart & Rowell 2008)

Synonyms
- Misgolas davidwilsoni Wishart & Rowell, 2008

Species of spider

Arbanitis davidwilsoni is a species of armoured trap-door spider in the family Idiopidae, and is endemic to New South Wales.

It was first described by Wishart and Rowell in 2008 as Misgolas davidwilsoni, but was transferred to the genus, Arbanitis, by Michael Rix and others in 2017.
