= Arbanitis yorkmainae =

Scientific classification
- Domain: Eukaryota
- Kingdom: Animalia
- Phylum: Arthropoda
- Subphylum: Chelicerata
- Class: Arachnida
- Order: Araneae
- Infraorder: Mygalomorphae
- Family: Idiopidae
- Genus: Arbanitis
- Species: A. yorkmainae

Binomial name
- Arbanitis yorkmainae (Wishart & Rowell 2008)

Synonyms
- Misgolas yorkmainae Wishart & Rowell, 2008

Species of spider

Arbanitis yorkmainae is a species of armoured trap-door spider in the family Idiopidae, and is endemic to New South Wales.

It was first described by Wishart and Rowell in 2008 as Misgolas yorkmainae, but was transferred to the genus, Arbanitis, by Michael Rix and others in 2017.
