= Arbanitis fredcoylei =

Scientific classification
- Domain: Eukaryota
- Kingdom: Animalia
- Phylum: Arthropoda
- Subphylum: Chelicerata
- Class: Arachnida
- Order: Araneae
- Infraorder: Mygalomorphae
- Family: Idiopidae
- Genus: Arbanitis
- Species: A. fredcoylei

Binomial name
- Arbanitis fredcoylei (Wishart & Rowell 2008)

Synonyms
- Misgolas fredcoylei Wishart & Rowell, 2008

Species of spider

Arbanitis fredcoylei is a species of armoured trap-door spider in the family Idiopidae, and is endemic to New South Wales.

It was first described by Wishart and Rowell in 2008 as Misgolas fredcoylei, but was transferred to the genus, Arbanitis, by Michael Rix and others in 2017.
