= Arbanitis lynabra =

Scientific classification
- Domain: Eukaryota
- Kingdom: Animalia
- Phylum: Arthropoda
- Subphylum: Chelicerata
- Class: Arachnida
- Order: Araneae
- Infraorder: Mygalomorphae
- Family: Idiopidae
- Genus: Arbanitis
- Species: A. lynabra

Binomial name
- Arbanitis lynabra (Wishart, 2006)

Synonyms
- Misgolas lynabra Wishart, 2006

Species of spider

Arbanitis lynabra is a species of armoured trap-door spider in the family Idiopidae, and is endemic to New South Wales.

It was first described by Graham Wishart in 2006 as Misgolas lynabra, but was transferred to the genus, Arbanitis, by Michael Rix and others in 2017.
