= Arbanitis horsemanae =

Scientific classification
- Domain: Eukaryota
- Kingdom: Animalia
- Phylum: Arthropoda
- Subphylum: Chelicerata
- Class: Arachnida
- Order: Araneae
- Infraorder: Mygalomorphae
- Family: Idiopidae
- Genus: Arbanitis
- Species: A. horsemanae

Binomial name
- Arbanitis horsemanae (Wishart, 2011)

Synonyms
- Misgolas horsemanae Wishart, 2011

Species of spider

Arbanitis horsemanae is a species of armoured trap-door spider in the family Idiopidae, and is endemic to New South Wales.

It was first described by Graham Wishart in 2011 as Misgolas horsemanae, but was transferred to the genus, Arbanitis, by Michael Rix and others in 2017.
