= Arbanitis tarnawskiae =

Scientific classification
- Domain: Eukaryota
- Kingdom: Animalia
- Phylum: Arthropoda
- Subphylum: Chelicerata
- Class: Arachnida
- Order: Araneae
- Infraorder: Mygalomorphae
- Family: Idiopidae
- Genus: Arbanitis
- Species: A. tarnawskiae

Binomial name
- Arbanitis tarnawskiae (Wishart & Rowell 2008)

Synonyms
- Misgolas tarnawskiae Wishart & Rowell, 2008

Species of spider

Arbanitis tarnawskiae is a species of armoured trap-door spider in the family Idiopidae, and is endemic to New South Wales.

It was first described by Wishart and Rowell in 2008 as Misgolas tarnawskiae, but was transferred to the genus, Arbanitis, by Michael Rix and others in 2017.
