= Arbanitis biroi =

Scientific classification
- Domain: Eukaryota
- Kingdom: Animalia
- Phylum: Arthropoda
- Subphylum: Chelicerata
- Class: Arachnida
- Order: Araneae
- Infraorder: Mygalomorphae
- Family: Idiopidae
- Genus: Arbanitis
- Species: A. biroi

Binomial name
- Arbanitis biroi (Kulczyński, 1908)

Synonyms
- Dyarcyops birói Kulczyński, 1908

Species of spider

Arbanitis crispus is a species of armoured trap-door spider in the family Idiopidae, and is endemic to New South Wales.

It was first described by Władysław Kulczyński in 1908 as Dyarcyops birói. In 2017, Michael Rix and others transferred it to the genus, Arbanitis. The species epithet honours Ludovico Biro from whose collection it was described.
