= Arbanitis maxhicksi =

Scientific classification
- Domain: Eukaryota
- Kingdom: Animalia
- Phylum: Arthropoda
- Subphylum: Chelicerata
- Class: Arachnida
- Order: Araneae
- Infraorder: Mygalomorphae
- Family: Idiopidae
- Genus: Arbanitis
- Species: A. maxhicksi

Binomial name
- Arbanitis maxhicksi (Wishart & Rowell 2008)

Synonyms
- Misgolas maxhicksi Wishart & Rowell, 2008

Species of spider

Arbanitis maxhicksi is a species of armoured trap-door spider in the family Idiopidae, and is endemic to New South Wales.

It was first described by Wishart and Rowell in 2008 as Misgolas maxhicksi, but was transferred to the genus, Arbanitis, by Michael Rix and others in 2017.
