= Arbanitis baehrae =

Scientific classification
- Domain: Eukaryota
- Kingdom: Animalia
- Phylum: Arthropoda
- Subphylum: Chelicerata
- Class: Arachnida
- Order: Araneae
- Infraorder: Mygalomorphae
- Family: Idiopidae
- Genus: Arbanitis
- Species: A. baehrae

Binomial name
- Arbanitis baehrae (Wishart & Rowell 2008)

Synonyms
- Misgolas baehrae Wishart & Rowell, 2008

Species of spider

Arbanitis baehrae is a species of armoured trap-door spider in the family Idiopidae, and is endemic to New South Wales.

It was first described by Wishart and Rowell in 2008 as Misgolas baehrae, but was transferred to the genus, Arbanitis, by Michael Rix and others in 2017.
