= Arbanitis wayorum =

Scientific classification
- Domain: Eukaryota
- Kingdom: Animalia
- Phylum: Arthropoda
- Subphylum: Chelicerata
- Class: Arachnida
- Order: Araneae
- Infraorder: Mygalomorphae
- Family: Idiopidae
- Genus: Arbanitis
- Species: A. wayorum

Binomial name
- Arbanitis wayorum (Wishart, 2006)

Synonyms
- Misgolas wayorum Wishart, 2006

Species of spider

Arbanitis wayorum is a species of armoured trap-door spider in the family Idiopidae, and is endemic to New South Wales.

It was first described by Wishart in 2006 as Misgolas wayorum, but was transferred to the genus, Arbanitis, by Michael Rix and others in 2017. The species epithet honours the Way family from Yowie Bay.
