= Arbanitis taiti =

Scientific classification
- Domain: Eukaryota
- Kingdom: Animalia
- Phylum: Arthropoda
- Subphylum: Chelicerata
- Class: Arachnida
- Order: Araneae
- Infraorder: Mygalomorphae
- Family: Idiopidae
- Genus: Arbanitis
- Species: A. taiti

Binomial name
- Arbanitis taiti (Wishart & Rowell 2008)

Synonyms
- Misgolas taiti Wishart & Rowell, 2008

Species of spider

Arbanitis taiti is a species of armoured trap-door spider in the family Idiopidae, and is endemic to New South Wales.

It was first described by Wishart and Rowell in 2008 as Misgolas taiti, but was transferred to the genus, Arbanitis, by Michael Rix and others in 2017.
