= Arbanitis tannerae =

Scientific classification
- Domain: Eukaryota
- Kingdom: Animalia
- Phylum: Arthropoda
- Subphylum: Chelicerata
- Class: Arachnida
- Order: Araneae
- Infraorder: Mygalomorphae
- Family: Idiopidae
- Genus: Arbanitis
- Species: A. tannerae

Binomial name
- Arbanitis tannerae (Wishart, 2011)

Synonyms
- Misgolas tannerae Wishart, 2011

Species of spider

Arbanitis tannerae is a species of armoured trap-door spider in the family Idiopidae, and is endemic to New South Wales.

It was first described by Graham Wishart in 2011 as Misgolas tannerae, but was transferred to the genus, Arbanitis, by Michael Rix and others in 2017.
