= Arbanitis thompsonae =

Scientific classification
- Domain: Eukaryota
- Kingdom: Animalia
- Phylum: Arthropoda
- Subphylum: Chelicerata
- Class: Arachnida
- Order: Araneae
- Infraorder: Mygalomorphae
- Family: Idiopidae
- Genus: Arbanitis
- Species: A. thompsonae

Binomial name
- Arbanitis thompsonae (Wishart & Rowell 2008)

Synonyms
- Misgolas thompsonae Wishart & Rowell, 2008

Species of spider

Arbanitis thompsonae is a species of armoured trap-door spider in the family Idiopidae, and is endemic to New South Wales.

It was first described by Wishart and Rowell in 2008 as Misgolas thompsonae, but was transferred to the genus, Arbanitis, by Michael Rix and others in 2017.
