= Arbanitis mascordi =

Scientific classification
- Domain: Eukaryota
- Kingdom: Animalia
- Phylum: Arthropoda
- Subphylum: Chelicerata
- Class: Arachnida
- Order: Araneae
- Infraorder: Mygalomorphae
- Family: Idiopidae
- Genus: Arbanitis
- Species: A. mascordi

Binomial name
- Arbanitis mascordi (Wishart, 1992)

Synonyms
- Misgolas mascordi Wishart, 1992

Species of spider

Arbanitis mascordi is a species of armoured trap-door spider in the family Idiopidae, and is endemic to New South Wales.

It was first described by Graham Wishart in 2006 as Misgolas mascordi, but was transferred to the genus, Arbanitis, by Michael Rix and others in 2017.
