= Arbanitis watsonorum =

Scientific classification
- Domain: Eukaryota
- Kingdom: Animalia
- Phylum: Arthropoda
- Subphylum: Chelicerata
- Class: Arachnida
- Order: Araneae
- Infraorder: Mygalomorphae
- Family: Idiopidae
- Genus: Arbanitis
- Species: A. watsonorum

Binomial name
- Arbanitis watsonorum (Wishart & Rowell 2008)

Synonyms
- Misgolas thompsonae Wishart & Rowell, 2008

Species of spider

Arbanitis watsonorum is a species of armoured trap-door spider in the family Idiopidae, and is endemic to New South Wales.

It was first described by Wishart and Rowell in 2008 as Misgolas watsonorum, but was transferred to the genus, Arbanitis, by Michael Rix and others in 2017. The species epithet, watsonorum, honours Ken and Sue Watson.

== Description ==
The carapace of the male holotype is 6.75 mm long by 5.15 mm wide, with an abdomen 7.74 mm by 4.55 mm. The female paratype has a carapace which is 12.85 mm by 9.33 mm and an abdomen 18.82 mm by 11.76 mm.
