= Arbanitis michaeli =

Scientific classification
- Domain: Eukaryota
- Kingdom: Animalia
- Phylum: Arthropoda
- Subphylum: Chelicerata
- Class: Arachnida
- Order: Araneae
- Infraorder: Mygalomorphae
- Family: Idiopidae
- Genus: Arbanitis
- Species: A. michaeli

Binomial name
- Arbanitis michaeli (Wishart, 2006)

Synonyms
- Misgolas michaeli Wishart, 2006

Species of spider

Arbanitis michaeli is a species of armoured trap-door spider in the family Idiopidae, and is endemic to New South Wales.

It was first described by Graham Wishart in 2006 as Misgolas michaeli, but was transferred to the genus, Arbanitis, by Michael Rix and others in 2017.

The species epithet, michaeli, honours the Australian arachnologist, Michael Gray.
