= Arbanitis kampenae =

Scientific classification
- Domain: Eukaryota
- Kingdom: Animalia
- Phylum: Arthropoda
- Subphylum: Chelicerata
- Class: Arachnida
- Order: Araneae
- Infraorder: Mygalomorphae
- Family: Idiopidae
- Genus: Arbanitis
- Species: A. kampenae

Binomial name
- Arbanitis kampenae (Wishart, 2011)

Synonyms
- Misgolas kampenae Wishart, 2011

Species of spider

Arbanitis kampenae is a species of armoured trap-door spider in the family Idiopidae, and is endemic to New South Wales.

It was first described by Graham Wishart in 2011 as Misgolas kampenae, but was transferred to the genus, Arbanitis, by Michael Rix and others in 2017.
