= Arbanitis grayi =

Scientific classification
- Domain: Eukaryota
- Kingdom: Animalia
- Phylum: Arthropoda
- Subphylum: Chelicerata
- Class: Arachnida
- Order: Araneae
- Infraorder: Mygalomorphae
- Family: Idiopidae
- Genus: Arbanitis
- Species: A. grayi

Binomial name
- Arbanitis grayi (Wishart & Rowell 2008)

Synonyms
- Misgolas grayi Wishart & Rowell, 2008

Species of spider

Arbanitis grayi is a species of armoured trap-door spider in the family Idiopidae, and is endemic to New South Wales.

It was first described by Wishart and Rowell in 2008 as Misgolas grayi, but was transferred to the genus, Arbanitis, by Michael Rix and others in 2017.

The species epithet honours the arachnologis, Michael R. Gray.
