= Arbanitis rodi =

Scientific classification
- Domain: Eukaryota
- Kingdom: Animalia
- Phylum: Arthropoda
- Subphylum: Chelicerata
- Class: Arachnida
- Order: Araneae
- Infraorder: Mygalomorphae
- Family: Idiopidae
- Genus: Arbanitis
- Species: A. rodi

Binomial name
- Arbanitis rodi (Wishart, 2006)

Synonyms
- Misgolas rodi Wishart, 2006

Species of spider

Arbanitis rodi is a species of armoured trap-door spider in the family Idiopidae, and is endemic to New South Wales.

It was first described by Graham Wishart in 2006 as Misgolas rodi, but was transferred to the genus, Arbanitis, by Michael Rix and others in 2017.
