= Hiboka =

Scientific classification
- Kingdom: Animalia
- Phylum: Arthropoda
- Subphylum: Chelicerata
- Class: Arachnida
- Order: Araneae
- Infraorder: Mygalomorphae
- Family: Idiopidae
- Genus: Hiboka; Fage, 1922
- Species: H. geayi

Binomial name
- Hiboka geayi Fage, 1922

Genus of spiders

Hiboka is a monotypic genus of East African armored trapdoor spiders containing the single species, Hiboka geayi. It was first described by L. Fage in 1922, and has only been found on Madagascar. Originally placed with the Ctenizidae, it was moved to the armored trapdoor spiders in 1985.
