= Arbanitis kirstiae =

Scientific classification
- Domain: Eukaryota
- Kingdom: Animalia
- Phylum: Arthropoda
- Subphylum: Chelicerata
- Class: Arachnida
- Order: Araneae
- Infraorder: Mygalomorphae
- Family: Idiopidae
- Genus: Arbanitis
- Species: A. kirstiae

Binomial name
- Arbanitis kirstiae (Wishart, 1992)

Synonyms
- Misgolas kirstiae Wishart, 1992

Species of spider

Arbanitis kirstiae is a species of armoured trap-door spider in the family Idiopidae, and is endemic to New South Wales.

It was first described by Graham Wishart in 2006 as Misgolas kirstiae, but was transferred to the genus, Arbanitis, by Michael Rix and others in 2017.
