= Arbanitis beni =

Scientific classification
- Domain: Eukaryota
- Kingdom: Animalia
- Phylum: Arthropoda
- Subphylum: Chelicerata
- Class: Arachnida
- Order: Araneae
- Infraorder: Mygalomorphae
- Family: Idiopidae
- Genus: Arbanitis
- Species: A. beni

Binomial name
- Arbanitis beni (Wishart, 2006)

Synonyms
- Misgolas beni Wishart, 2006

Species of spider

Arbanitis beni is a species of armoured trap-door spider in the family Idiopidae, and is endemic to New South Wales.

It was first described by Graham Wishart in 2006 as Misgolas beni, but was transferred to the genus, Arbanitis, by Michael Rix and others in 2017.
