= Arbanitis crispus =

Scientific classification
- Domain: Eukaryota
- Kingdom: Animalia
- Phylum: Arthropoda
- Subphylum: Chelicerata
- Class: Arachnida
- Order: Araneae
- Infraorder: Mygalomorphae
- Family: Idiopidae
- Genus: Arbanitis
- Species: A. crispus

Binomial name
- Arbanitis crispus (Karsch, 1878)

Synonyms
- Hermeas crispus Karsch, 1878; Megalas crispus (Karsch, 1878); Arbanitis scaurus Hickman, 1927; Dyarcyops scaurus (Hickman, 1927)

Species of spider

Arbanitis crispus is a species of armoured trap-door spider in the family Idiopidae, and is endemic to Tasmania.

It was first described by Ferdinand Karsch in 1878 as Hermeas crispus in 1985 Barbara Main transferred it to Misgolas, and at the same time synonymised it with Dyarcyops scaurus. In 2017, Michael Rix and others but was transferred to the genus, Arbanitis.
