= Arbanitis cliffi =

Scientific classification
- Domain: Eukaryota
- Kingdom: Animalia
- Phylum: Arthropoda
- Subphylum: Chelicerata
- Class: Arachnida
- Order: Araneae
- Infraorder: Mygalomorphae
- Family: Idiopidae
- Genus: Arbanitis
- Species: A. cliffi

Binomial name
- Arbanitis cliffi (Wishart, 2006)

Synonyms
- Misgolas cliffi Wishart, 2006

Species of spider

Arbanitis cliffi is a species of armoured trap-door spider in the family Idiopidae, and is endemic to New South Wales.

It was first described by Graham Wishart in 2006 as Misgolas cliffi, but was transferred to the genus, Arbanitis, by Michael Rix and others in 2017.
