= Arbanitis milledgei =

Scientific classification
- Domain: Eukaryota
- Kingdom: Animalia
- Phylum: Arthropoda
- Subphylum: Chelicerata
- Class: Arachnida
- Order: Araneae
- Infraorder: Mygalomorphae
- Family: Idiopidae
- Genus: Arbanitis
- Species: A. milledgei

Binomial name
- Arbanitis milledgei (Wishart & Rowell 2008)

Synonyms
- Misgolas milledgei Wishart & Rowell, 2008

Species of spider

Arbanitis milledgei is a species of armoured trap-door spider in the family Idiopidae, and is endemic to New South Wales.

It was first described by Wishart and Rowell in 2008 as Misgolas milledgei, but was transferred to the genus, Arbanitis, by Michael Rix and others in 2017.
