= Arbanitis crawfordorum =

Scientific classification
- Domain: Eukaryota
- Kingdom: Animalia
- Phylum: Arthropoda
- Subphylum: Chelicerata
- Class: Arachnida
- Order: Araneae
- Infraorder: Mygalomorphae
- Family: Idiopidae
- Genus: Arbanitis
- Species: A. crawfordorum

Binomial name
- Arbanitis crawfordorum (Wishart & Rowell 2008)

Synonyms
- Misgolas crawfordorum Wishart & Rowell, 2008

Species of spider

Arbanitis crawfordorum is a species of armoured trap-door spider in the family Idiopidae, and is endemic to Queensland.

It was first described by Wishart and Rowell in 2008 as Misgolas crawfordorum, but was transferred to the genus, Arbanitis, by Michael Rix and others in 2017.
