= Arbanitis billsheari =

Scientific classification
- Domain: Eukaryota
- Kingdom: Animalia
- Phylum: Arthropoda
- Subphylum: Chelicerata
- Class: Arachnida
- Order: Araneae
- Infraorder: Mygalomorphae
- Family: Idiopidae
- Genus: Arbanitis
- Species: A. billsheari

Binomial name
- Arbanitis billsheari (Wishart & Rowell 2008)

Synonyms
- Misgolas billsheari Wishart & Rowell, 2008

Species of spider

Arbanitis billsheari is a species of armoured trap-door spider in the family Idiopidae, and is endemic to New South Wales.

It was first described by Wishart and Rowell in 2008 as Misgolas billsheari, but was transferred to the genus, Arbanitis, by Michael Rix and others in 2017.
