= Arbanitis longipes =

Scientific classification
- Domain: Eukaryota
- Kingdom: Animalia
- Phylum: Arthropoda
- Subphylum: Chelicerata
- Class: Arachnida
- Order: Araneae
- Infraorder: Mygalomorphae
- Family: Idiopidae
- Genus: Arbanitis
- Species: A. longipes

Binomial name
- Arbanitis longipes (L. Koch, 1873)

Synonyms
- Pholeuon longipes L. Koch, 1873; Arbanitis pulchellus Rainbow & Pulleine, 1918; Aname pulchra Rainbow & Pulleine, 1918; Dyarcyops pulchellus (Rainbow & Pulleine, 1918)

Species of spider

Arbanitis longipes (common name Brisbane tube spider) is a species of armoured trap-door spider in the family Idiopidae, and is endemic to New South Wales and Queensland.

It was first described by Carl Ludwig Koch in 1873 as Pholeuon longipes, but was transferred to the genus, Arbanitis, by Koch in 1874.

== Description ==
A. longipes is a robust spider having a body length of 15-20mm. The legs and carapace are orange brown. The legs have dark brown bars down the sides, and the carapace has bands of long golden hairs. The abdomen is dark brown on the back, a mottled brown on the sides and fawn on the underside. The sternum and mouthparts are red brown. Males have long spines in 4-9 rows on the rear of the palpal tibial apophysis and have no tibial spur.

The females build a sinuous burrow (8-20cm long), which may have a second entrance. The main entrance is inclined at 30° and has a wide flanged collar which is often decorated with leaves.

== Behaviour ==
This spider is terrestrial and nocturnal and is generally not aggressive. The females build a burrow where they largely stay, moulting each year, while the males wander yearlong in search of females, with activity peaking in summer from November to April. It tends not to be aggressive. It is thought the females may live for up to 10 years.

== Distribution ==
It occurs from Beerwah to Main Range National Park in varied habitats. It occurs in rainforest, in vine thickets, open forest, roadside vergesand disturbed habitat adjacent to industrial areas. They are abundant along roadside verges adjacent to rainforest.

== Conservation status ==
Urban development is thought to threaten this long-lived, sedentary spider which occurs in proximity to large and growing urban areas.
