= Arbanitis raveni =

Scientific classification
- Domain: Eukaryota
- Kingdom: Animalia
- Phylum: Arthropoda
- Subphylum: Chelicerata
- Class: Arachnida
- Order: Araneae
- Infraorder: Mygalomorphae
- Family: Idiopidae
- Genus: Arbanitis
- Species: A. raveni

Binomial name
- Arbanitis raveni (Wishart & Rowell 2008)

Synonyms
- Misgolas raveni Wishart & Rowell, 2008

Species of spider

Arbanitis raveni is a species of armoured trap-door spider in the family Idiopidae, and is endemic to New South Wales.

It was first described by Wishart and Rowell in 2008 as Misgolas raveni, but was transferred to the genus, Arbanitis, by Michael Rix and others in 2017.
