= Arbanitis macei =

Scientific classification
- Domain: Eukaryota
- Kingdom: Animalia
- Phylum: Arthropoda
- Subphylum: Chelicerata
- Class: Arachnida
- Order: Araneae
- Infraorder: Mygalomorphae
- Family: Idiopidae
- Genus: Arbanitis
- Species: A. macei

Binomial name
- Arbanitis macei (Wishart & Rowell 2008)

Synonyms
- Misgolas macei Wishart & Rowell, 2008

Species of spider

Arbanitis macei is a species of armoured trap-door spider in the family Idiopidae, and is endemic to New South Wales.

It was first described by Wishart and Rowell in 2008 as Misgolas macei, but was transferred to the genus, Arbanitis, by Michael Rix and others in 2017.
