= Arbanitis andrewsi =

Scientific classification
- Domain: Eukaryota
- Kingdom: Animalia
- Phylum: Arthropoda
- Subphylum: Chelicerata
- Class: Arachnida
- Order: Araneae
- Infraorder: Mygalomorphae
- Family: Idiopidae
- Genus: Arbanitis
- Species: A. andrewsi

Binomial name
- Arbanitis andrewsi (Hogg, 1902)

Synonyms
- Dyarcyops andrewsi Hogg, 1902; Misgolas andrewsi (Hogg, 1902); Arbanitis andrewsi (Hogg, 1902)

Species of spider

Arbanitis andrewsi is a species of armoured trap-door spider in the family Idiopidae, and is endemic to South Australia.

It was first described by Henry Roughton Hogg in 1902 as Dyarcyops andrewsi, but was transferred to the genus, Misgolas, by Barbara Main in 1985 and then to the genus, Arbanitis, by Michael Rix and others in 2017.
