= Arbanitis linklateri =

Scientific classification
- Domain: Eukaryota
- Kingdom: Animalia
- Phylum: Arthropoda
- Subphylum: Chelicerata
- Class: Arachnida
- Order: Araneae
- Infraorder: Mygalomorphae
- Family: Idiopidae
- Genus: Arbanitis
- Species: A. linklateri

Binomial name
- Arbanitis linklateri (Wishart & Rowell 2008)

Synonyms
- Misgolas linklateri Wishart & Rowell, 2008

Species of spider

Arbanitis linklateri is a species of armoured trap-door spider in the family Idiopidae, and is endemic to New South Wales.

It was first described by Wishart and Rowell in 2008 as Misgolas linklateri, but was transferred to the genus, Arbanitis, by Michael Rix and others in 2017.
