= Arbanitis phippsi =

Scientific classification
- Domain: Eukaryota
- Kingdom: Animalia
- Phylum: Arthropoda
- Subphylum: Chelicerata
- Class: Arachnida
- Order: Araneae
- Infraorder: Mygalomorphae
- Family: Idiopidae
- Genus: Arbanitis
- Species: A. phippsi

Binomial name
- Arbanitis phippsi (Wishart, 2011)

Synonyms
- Misgolas phippsi Wishart, 2011

Species of beetle

Arbanitis phippsi is a spiny trapdoor spider in the Idiopidae family, which is found in New South Wales, Australia.

It was first described by Graham Wishart in 2011 as Misgolas phippsi, In 2015, genera boundaries in the Mygalomorphae were redefined by Michael Rix and others, defining the new genus Arbanitis, and giving the new species name, Arbanitis phippsi.
