= Arbanitis sydjordanae =

Scientific classification
- Domain: Eukaryota
- Kingdom: Animalia
- Phylum: Arthropoda
- Subphylum: Chelicerata
- Class: Arachnida
- Order: Araneae
- Infraorder: Mygalomorphae
- Family: Idiopidae
- Genus: Arbanitis
- Species: A. sydjordanae

Binomial name
- Arbanitis sydjordanae (Wishart & Rowell 2008)

Synonyms
- Misgolas sydjordanae Wishart & Rowell, 2008

Species of spider

Arbanitis sydjordanae is a species of armoured trap-door spider in the family Idiopidae, and is endemic to New South Wales.

It was first described by Wishart and Rowell in 2008 as Misgolas sydjordanae, but was transferred to the genus, Arbanitis, by Michael Rix and others in 2017.
