= Arbanitis trangae =

Scientific classification
- Domain: Eukaryota
- Kingdom: Animalia
- Phylum: Arthropoda
- Subphylum: Chelicerata
- Class: Arachnida
- Order: Araneae
- Infraorder: Mygalomorphae
- Family: Idiopidae
- Genus: Arbanitis
- Species: A. trangae

Binomial name
- Arbanitis trangae (Wishart, 2006)

Synonyms
- Misgolas trangae Wishart, 2006

Species of spider

Arbanitis trangae is a species of armoured trap-door spider in the family Idiopidae, and is endemic to New South Wales.

It was first described by Wishart in 2006 as Misgolas trangae, but was transferred to the genus, Arbanitis, by Michael Rix and others in 2017.
