= Arbanitis mudfordae =

Scientific classification
- Domain: Eukaryota
- Kingdom: Animalia
- Phylum: Arthropoda
- Subphylum: Chelicerata
- Class: Arachnida
- Order: Araneae
- Infraorder: Mygalomorphae
- Family: Idiopidae
- Genus: Arbanitis
- Species: A. mudfordae

Binomial name
- Arbanitis mudfordae (Wishart & Rowell, 2008)

Synonyms
- Misgolas mudfordae Wishart & Rowell, 2008

Species of beetle

Arbanitis mudfordae is a spiny trapdoor spider in the Idiopidae family, which is found in New South Wales.

It was first described by Graham Wishart and David Rowell in 2008 as Misgolas mudfordae, In 2015, genera boundaries in the Mygalomorphae were redefined by Rix and others, defining the new genus Arbanitis, and giving the new species name, Arbanitis mudfordae.
