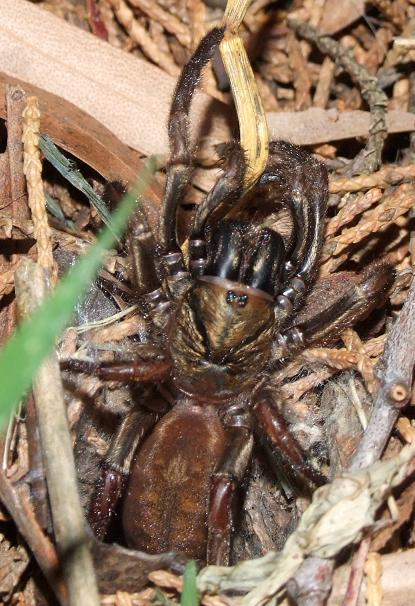

Scientific classification
- Kingdom: Animalia
- Phylum: Arthropoda
- Subphylum: Chelicerata
- Class: Arachnida
- Order: Araneae
- Infraorder: Mygalomorphae
- Family: Idiopidae
- Genus: Arbanitis
- Species: A. rapax

Binomial name
- Arbanitis rapax (Karsch, 1878)

Synonyms
- Misgolas rapax Karsch, 1878; Misgolas hubbardi Wishart, 1992

= Sydney brown trapdoor spider =

Species of spider

The Sydney brown trapdoor spider (Arbanitis rapax, synonym Misgolas rapax) is a spider in the family Idiopidae, found primarily around Sydney, Australia. It is usually shy and retiring and is often confused with the Sydney funnel-web spider, which is one of the most venomous spiders in the world.

== Description ==
Sydney brown trapdoors are medium-to-large in size; the female is around 35 mm in length, while the male is usually around 20 mm and of a slimmer build. They are chocolate brown coloured and the males have distinct boxing glove-shaped palps, which are the appendages at the front of the head between the first pair of legs.

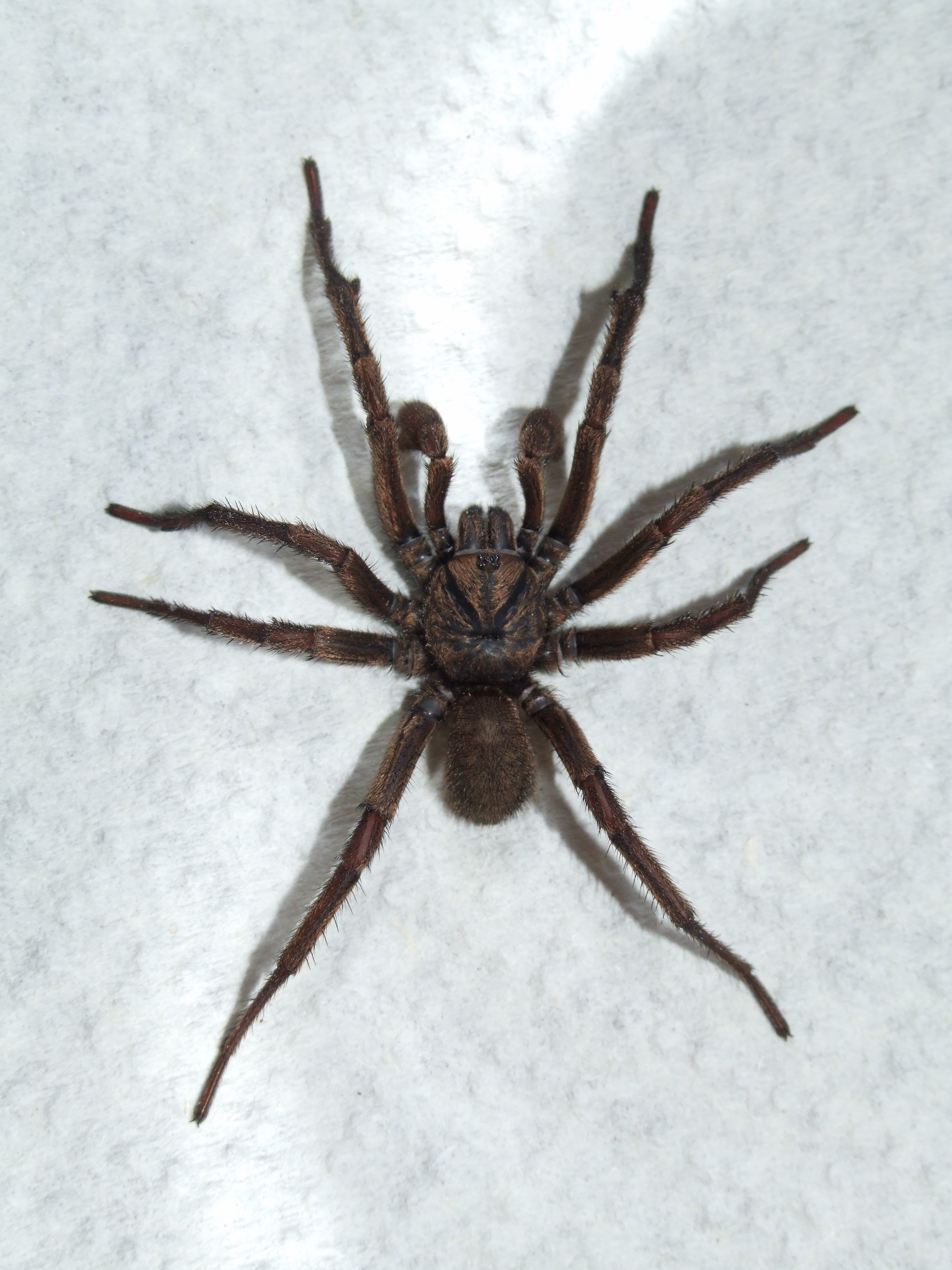
Male

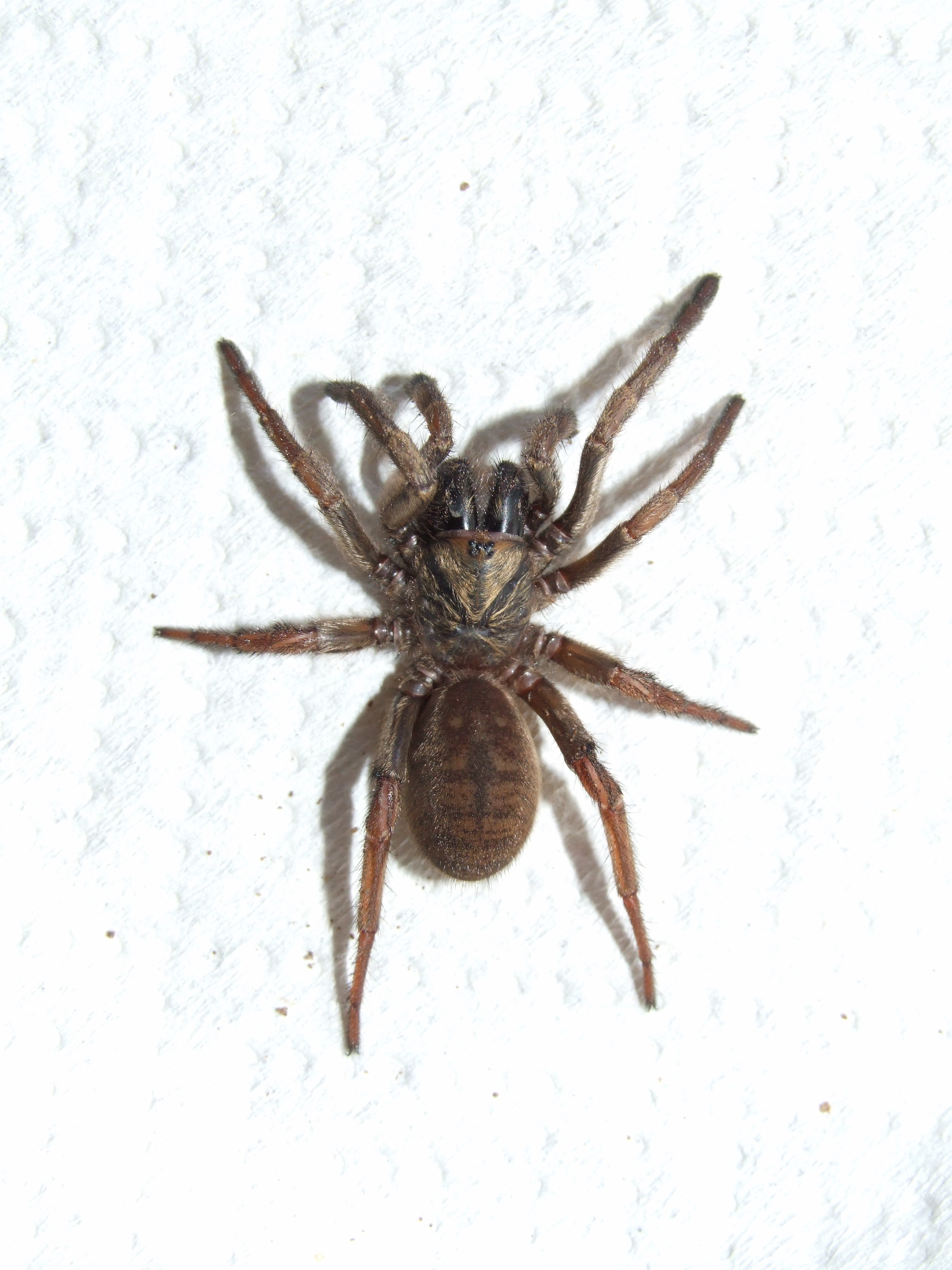
Female

== Behaviour ==
Sydney brown trapdoors are usually shy and retiring, although the occasional individual will stand up and show its fangs if harassed inside its burrow. They spend most of the time in their burrows. At night, they are waiting for food in front of their burrows. Mature male Sydney brown trapdoors wander during humid weather in search of a mate. Mating takes place within the female's burrow. Usually the male escapes being eaten in order to mate with several females, before dying. The eggs are kept in the mother's burrow in a cocoon. After hatching, the spiderlings stay in the burrow for some time and eventually emerge to disperse and fend for themselves.

== Habitat ==
Sydney brown trapdoors dig an open burrow in the ground that is lined with silk. These burrows may reach 250 mm in depth and around 25 mm in width. Brown trapdoors with silk triplines around them are often found at the entrances to the burrows.

== Toxicity ==
Often mistaken for funnel-webs, the bites of Sydney brown trapdoors are not dangerous. Local pain and swelling may occur.

== Gallery ==
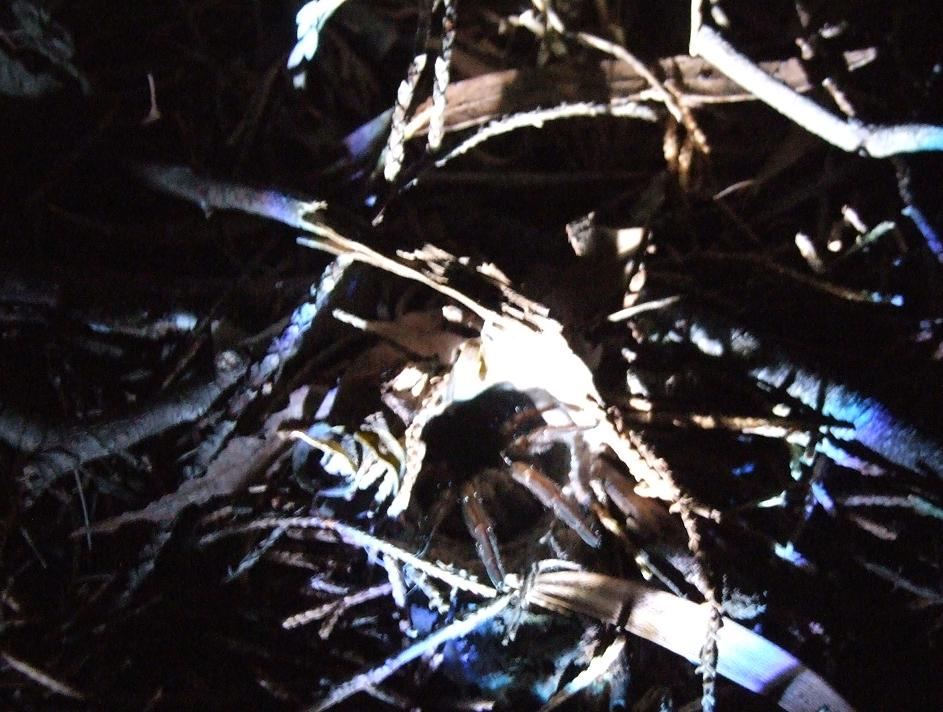
In Kurrajong, New South Wales.

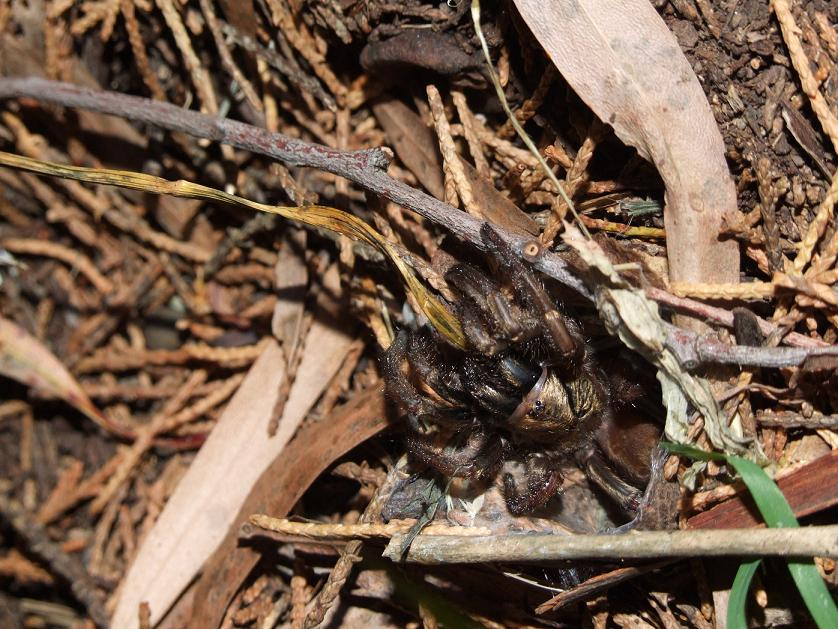
Looking out of its burrow in Kurrajong, New South Wales

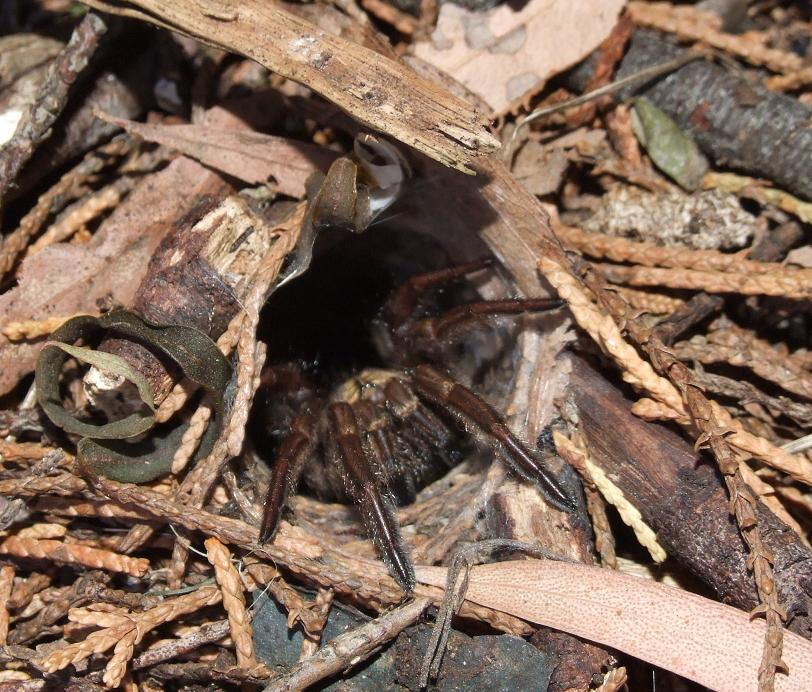
In its burrow in Kurrajong, New South Wales

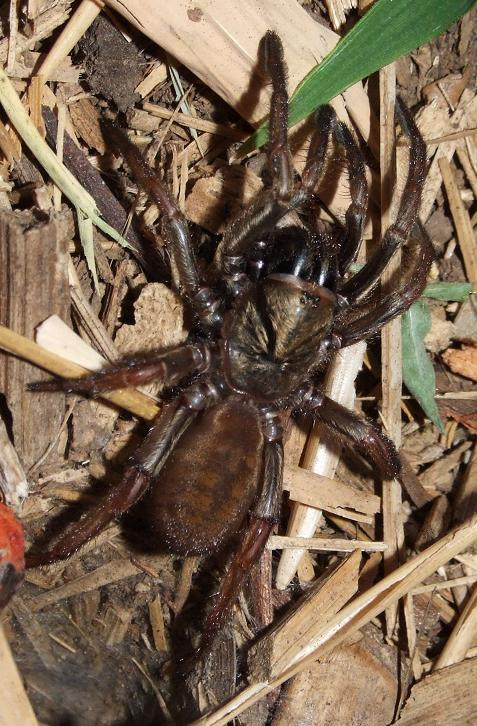
Outside its burrow in Kurrajong, New South Wales

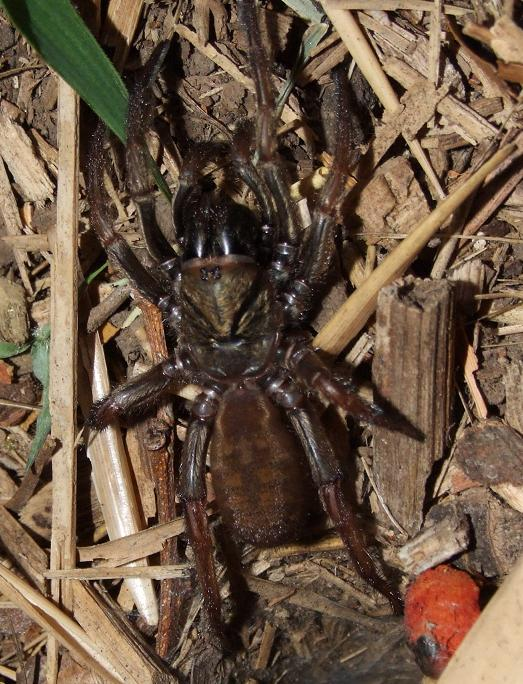
Outside its burrow in Kurrajong, New South Wales

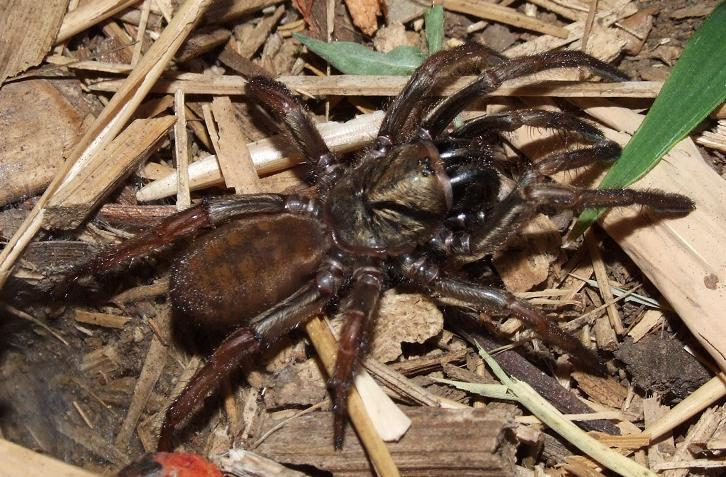
Outside its burrow in Kurrajong, New South Wales

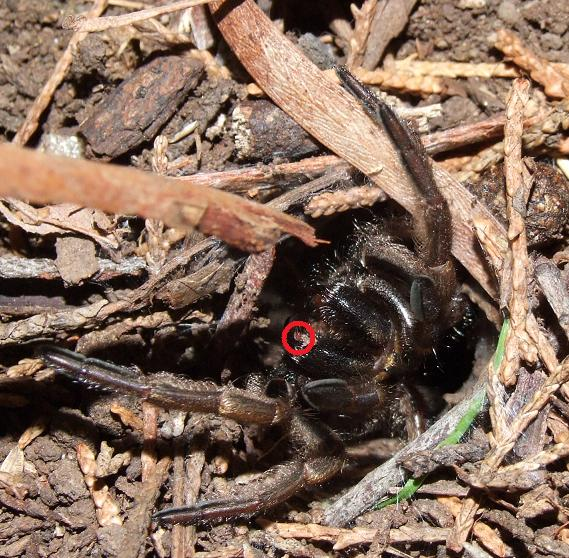
Attacking a stick and showing its fangs with a venom drop (see red circle) in Kurrajong, New South Wales

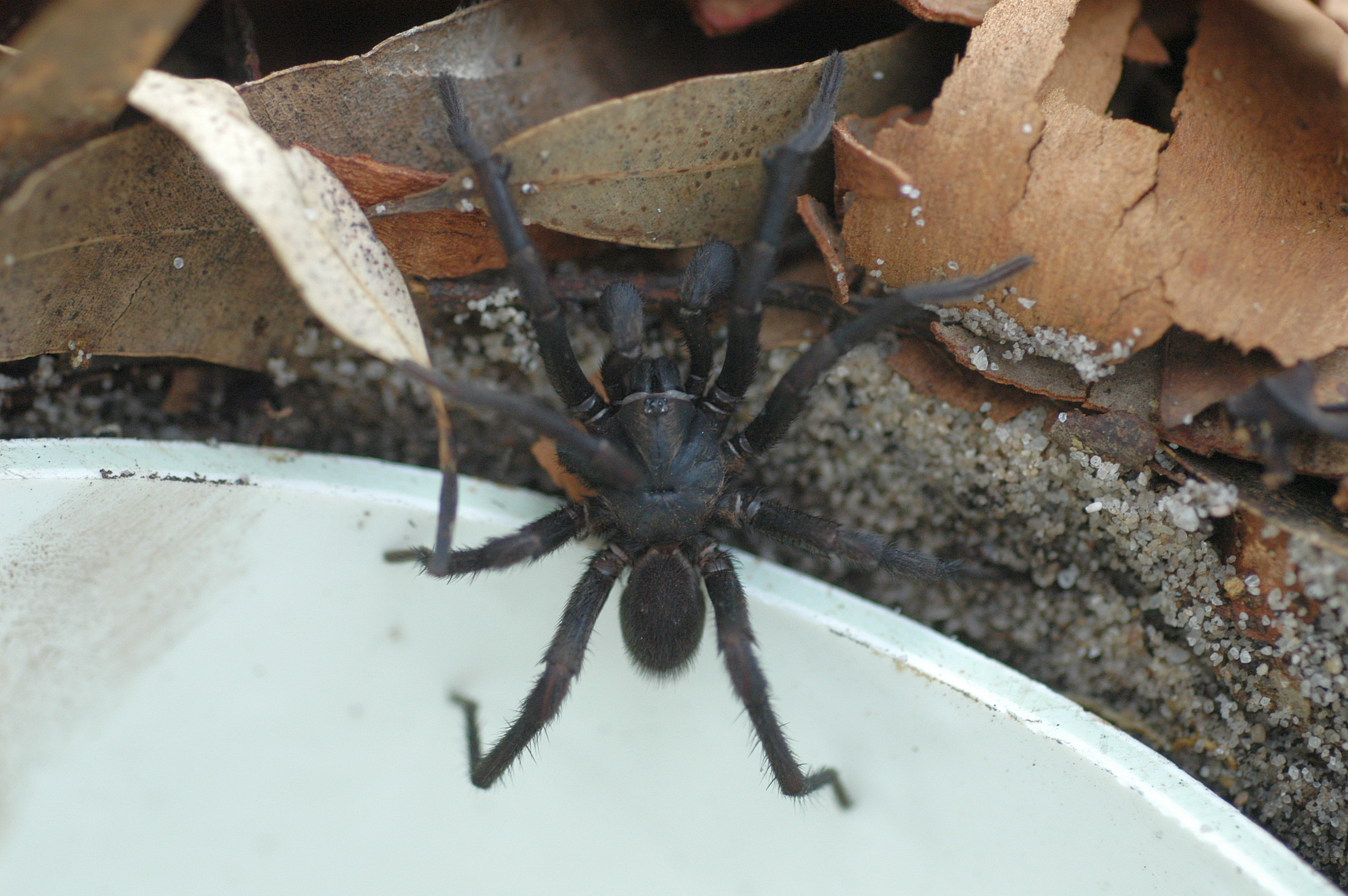
Male in MacMasters Beach, New South Wales
