= Robert Henry Pulleine =

Australian physician and naturalist

Robert Henry Pulleine (7 June 1869 – 13 June 1935) was an Australian physician and naturalist, who was known internationally for his studies of Australian trapdoor spiders.

Pulleine was born in Picton, New Zealand and spent much of his childhood in Fiji. In 1881 his family moved to Adelaide in South Australia. He studied medicine in Adelaide, Sydney and, later, in Germany and Britain, eventually becoming an eye, ear, nose and throat specialist, setting up as a consultant in Adelaide. He married Ethel Constance Louise Cunningham Williams in 1899, with whom he had a son and four daughters.

Pulleine had a deep interest in natural history as well as in anthropology. He belonged to 18 learned societies and published numerous articles and scientific papers on medical, zoological, botanical and other topics. With arachnologist William Joseph Rainbow, he described several species of trapdoor spiders.
