= William Joseph Rainbow =

British/Australian entomologist and arachnologist

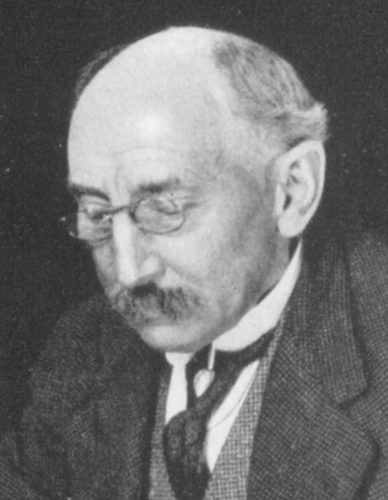
William Joseph Rainbow

William Joseph Rainbow (1856–1919) was an entomologist and arachnologist whose work includes the first catalogue of Australian spiders.

== Life ==
Rainbow was born in 1856 in Yorkshire, England. His father was a Warrant Officer in the Royal Marines, so his education was in a number of port towns and in Edinburgh. He emigrated to New Zealand in 1873, where he wrote for John Ballance's Wanganui Herald. Rainbow's early interest in natural history was assisted by Ballance, who prompted him to build a career in the field.

In 1883 he moved to Sydney, Australia and married Arriette Dainty. He continued to contribute to newspapers and journals, including The Sydney Morning Herald, Daily Telegraph, and Evening News, then worked for the Government Printing Office until 1895; in this year he took up a position at the Australian Museum as an entomologist.

Rainbow was a founder of the Naturalists' Society of New South Wales, serving as its president. He was a member of the Linnean Society of New South Wales and Council of the Royal Zoological Society of New South Wales. He was made a fellow of the Entomological Society of London and Linnean Society of London, and a member of the Société Entomologique de France.

He died in Sydney on 21 November 1919, having suffered several tragic losses. His second son, Sergeant Oscar A. Rainbow, was killed in World War I, an event that seems to have precipitated the death of Arriette in 1917. His eldest son was William A. Rainbow, a librarian at the Australian Museum. Rainbow's death was a few days before his youngest, Eric, also a Sergeant, returned from active service.

== Works ==
During the period from 1893 until his death, he described around 200 species of spiders, and wrote 71 papers, around 50 of these on the subject of arachnology. His catalogue of Australian orb-weaver spiders, A Census of Australian Araneidae, listing 1102 species, was produced in 1911; it is noted as a significant advancement in the much ignored spiders of Australia. His works included papers on the spiders found in all the Australian states and the Pacific region. He also wrote two guide books, A guide to the study of Australian butterflies (T.C. Lothian, Melbourne, 1907) and Mosquitoes; their Habits and Distribution.

He left an incomplete manuscript, "Spiders from Molangul, S.E. Queensland" that was accompanied by his sketches.

His collection of specimens is maintained by the Australian Museum; this includes a collection of Australian Acari, mites and ticks, whose study was begun by Rainbow.

The species Trittame rainbowi commemorates this author's contribution to the field of Australian arachnids. The author citation Rainbow refers to this entomologist and arachnologist when citing a biological classification.
