= E. inornatus =

E. inornatus may refer to:

- Epicrates inornatus, a snake species
- Erigeron inornatus, a plant species
- Euoplos inornatus, a spider species in the genus Euoplos

== See also ==
- Inornatus
