= Cryptoforis fallax =

Scientific classification
- Kingdom: Animalia
- Phylum: Arthropoda
- Subphylum: Chelicerata
- Class: Arachnida
- Order: Araneae
- Infraorder: Mygalomorphae
- Family: Idiopidae
- Genus: Cryptoforis
- Species: C. fallax

Binomial name
- Cryptoforis fallax Wilson, Raven, & Rix, 2021

Species of spider

Cryptoforis fallax is a species of mygalomorph spider in the Idiopidae family. It is endemic to Australia. It was described in 2021 by Australian arachnologists Jeremy Wilson, Robert Raven and Michael Rix. The specific epithet fallax (Latin for 'deceitful' or 'false') refers to the species’ convergently deceptive similarity, in both female morphology and burrow entrance structure, to some species of Euoplos.

== Distribution and habitat ==
The species occurs in north-eastern New South Wales in habitat dominated by tall open eucalypt forest, with patches of riparian rainforest and vine-scrub. The type locality is Sherwood Creek Road in the Conglomerate State Forest, in the Northern Rivers region.
