= Cryptoforis woondum =

Scientific classification
- Kingdom: Animalia
- Phylum: Arthropoda
- Subphylum: Chelicerata
- Class: Arachnida
- Order: Araneae
- Infraorder: Mygalomorphae
- Family: Idiopidae
- Genus: Cryptoforis
- Species: C. woondum

Binomial name
- Cryptoforis woondum Wilson, Raven, & Rix, 2021

Species of spider

Cryptoforis woondum is a species of mygalomorph spider in the Idiopidae family. It is endemic to Australia. It was described in 2021 by Australian arachnologists Jeremy Wilson, Robert Raven and Michael Rix. The specific epithet woondum refers to the type locality.

== Distribution and habitat ==
The species occurs in south-eastern Queensland in habitat which is mainly open eucalypt forest with patches of subtropical rainforest and vine-scrub. The type locality is Woondum National Park in the Gympie Region.
