= Cryptoforis grayi =

Scientific classification
- Kingdom: Animalia
- Phylum: Arthropoda
- Subphylum: Chelicerata
- Class: Arachnida
- Order: Araneae
- Infraorder: Mygalomorphae
- Family: Idiopidae
- Genus: Cryptoforis
- Species: C. grayi

Binomial name
- Cryptoforis grayi Wilson, Raven, & Rix, 2021

Species of spider

Cryptoforis grayi is a species of mygalomorph spider in the Idiopidae family. It is endemic to Australia. It was described in 2021 by Australian arachnologists Jeremy Wilson, Robert Raven and Michael Rix. The specific epithet grayi honours Mike Gray for his contributions to arachnology, especially his taxonomic work on the Atracidae.

== Distribution and habitat ==
The species occurs in north-eastern New South Wales in habitat dominated by tall open eucalypt forest and subtropical rainforest, with cool-temperate cloud forest at higher elevations. The type locality is Werrikimbe National Park.
