= Bungulla inermis =

Scientific classification
- Kingdom: Animalia
- Phylum: Arthropoda
- Subphylum: Chelicerata
- Class: Arachnida
- Order: Araneae
- Infraorder: Mygalomorphae
- Family: Idiopidae
- Genus: Bungulla
- Species: B. inermis

Binomial name
- Bungulla inermis Rix, Raven & Harvey, 2018

Species of spider

Bungulla inermis is a species of mygalomorph spider in the Idiopidae family. It is endemic to Australia. It was described in 2018 by Australian arachnologists Michael Rix, Robert Raven and Mark Harvey. The specific epithet inermis comes from the Latin for “defenceless” or “toothless”, with reference to the morphology of the male palpal tibia, which lacks spinules.

== Distribution and habitat ==
The species occurs in south-west Western Australia in the north-eastern Avon Wheatbelt bioregion, from Mount Gibson southwards to Merredin. The type locality is 2 km north of Bunce Bin, near Beacon.
