= Cryptoforis cassisi =

Scientific classification
- Kingdom: Animalia
- Phylum: Arthropoda
- Subphylum: Chelicerata
- Class: Arachnida
- Order: Araneae
- Infraorder: Mygalomorphae
- Family: Idiopidae
- Genus: Cryptoforis
- Species: C. cassisi

Binomial name
- Cryptoforis cassisi Wilson, Raven, & Rix, 2021

Species of spider

Cryptoforis cassisi is a species of mygalomorph spider in the Idiopidae family. It is endemic to Australia. It was described in 2021 by Australian arachnologists Jeremy Wilson, Robert Raven and Michael Rix. The specific epithet cassisi honours entomologist Gerry Cassis, who was involved in sampling Cryptoforis species from New South Wales.

== Distribution and habitat ==
The species occurs in north-eastern New South Wales. The type locality is tall open eucalypt forest with patches of cool-temperate rainforest, at elevations above 690 m, in Tapin Tops National Park in the Mid North Coast region.
