= Cryptoforis monteithi =

Scientific classification
- Kingdom: Animalia
- Phylum: Arthropoda
- Subphylum: Chelicerata
- Class: Arachnida
- Order: Araneae
- Infraorder: Mygalomorphae
- Family: Idiopidae
- Genus: Cryptoforis
- Species: C. monteithi

Binomial name
- Cryptoforis monteithi Wilson, Raven, & Rix, 2021

Species of spider

Cryptoforis monteithi is a species of mygalomorph spider in the Idiopidae family. It is endemic to Australia. It was described in 2021 by Australian arachnologists Jeremy Wilson, Robert Raven and Michael Rix. The specific epithet monteithi honours Geoff Monteith, who has contributed numerous specimens to the Queensland Museum.

== Distribution and habitat ==
The species occurs in the Wet Tropics of north-eastern Queensland. The type locality is warm-temperate rainforest at an elevation of 1,000 m, at Upper Boulder Creek in Japoon National Park, near Tully.
