= Cryptoforis montana =

Scientific classification
- Kingdom: Animalia
- Phylum: Arthropoda
- Subphylum: Chelicerata
- Class: Arachnida
- Order: Araneae
- Infraorder: Mygalomorphae
- Family: Idiopidae
- Genus: Cryptoforis
- Species: C. montana

Binomial name
- Cryptoforis montana Wilson, Raven, & Rix, 2021

Species of spider

Cryptoforis montana is a species of mygalomorph spider in the Idiopidae family. It is endemic to Australia. It was described in 2021 by Australian arachnologists Jeremy Wilson, Robert Raven and Michael Rix. The specific epithet montana, from the Latin montanus (‘of mountains’), refers to the topography of the species’ range.

== Distribution and habitat ==
The species occurs in south-eastern Queensland, in the cool-temperate cloud forests on the highest peaks of the McPherson Range. The type locality is Echo Point in Lamington National Park.
