= Bungulla harrisonae =

Scientific classification
- Kingdom: Animalia
- Phylum: Arthropoda
- Subphylum: Chelicerata
- Class: Arachnida
- Order: Araneae
- Infraorder: Mygalomorphae
- Family: Idiopidae
- Genus: Bungulla
- Species: B. harrisonae

Binomial name
- Bungulla harrisonae Rix, Raven & Harvey, 2018

Species of spider

Bungulla harrisonae is a species of mygalomorph spider in the Idiopidae family. It is endemic to Australia. It was described in 2018 by Australian arachnologists Michael Rix, Robert Raven and Mark Harvey. The specific epithet harrisonae honours arachnologist Sophie Harrison for her contributions to idiopid systematics, especially the taxonomy of Blakistonia.

== Distribution and habitat ==
The species occurs in south-west Western Australia in the Jarrah Forest bioregion. The type locality is in jarrah forest in the John Forrest National Park, on the Darling Scarp, some 24 km east of Perth.
