= Cryptoforis cooloola =

Scientific classification
- Kingdom: Animalia
- Phylum: Arthropoda
- Subphylum: Chelicerata
- Class: Arachnida
- Order: Araneae
- Infraorder: Mygalomorphae
- Family: Idiopidae
- Genus: Cryptoforis
- Species: C. cooloola

Binomial name
- Cryptoforis cooloola Wilson, Raven, & Rix, 2021

Species of spider

Cryptoforis cooloola is a species of mygalomorph spider in the Idiopidae family. It is endemic to Australia. It was described in 2021 by Australian arachnologists Jeremy Wilson, Robert Raven and Michael Rix. The specific epithet cooloola refers to the type locality.

== Distribution and habitat ==
The species occurs in south-eastern Queensland. The type locality is Cooloola, in the Great Sandy National Park, in open eucalypt forest and littoral rainforest on sand.
