= Bungulla ferraria =

Scientific classification
- Kingdom: Animalia
- Phylum: Arthropoda
- Subphylum: Chelicerata
- Class: Arachnida
- Order: Araneae
- Infraorder: Mygalomorphae
- Family: Idiopidae
- Genus: Bungulla
- Species: B. ferraria

Binomial name
- Bungulla ferraria Rix, Raven & Harvey, 2018

Species of spider

Bungulla ferraria is a species of mygalomorph spider in the Idiopidae family. It is endemic to Australia. It was described in 2018 by Australian arachnologists Michael Rix, Robert Raven and Mark Harvey. The specific epithet ferraria comes from the Latin for “pertaining to iron”, with reference to the type locality.

== Distribution and habitat ==
The species occurs in the Mid West region of Western Australia in the Avon Wheatbelt and Geraldton Sandplains bioregions. The type locality is Mount Gibson iron ore mine.
