= Cryptoforis hickmani =

Scientific classification
- Kingdom: Animalia
- Phylum: Arthropoda
- Subphylum: Chelicerata
- Class: Arachnida
- Order: Araneae
- Infraorder: Mygalomorphae
- Family: Idiopidae
- Genus: Cryptoforis
- Species: C. hickmani

Binomial name
- Cryptoforis hickmani Wilson, Raven, & Rix, 2021

Species of spider

Cryptoforis hickmani is a species of mygalomorph spider in the Idiopidae family. It is endemic to Australia. It was described in 2021 by Australian arachnologists Jeremy Wilson, Robert Raven and Michael Rix. The specific epithet hickmani honours arachnologist Vernon Victor Hickman (1894–1984) for his contributions to arachnology and for describing many Tasmanian spider species.

== Distribution and habitat ==
The species occurs in north-eastern Tasmania in the Ben Lomond and Furneaux bioregions. The habitat is mainly open eucalypt forest, interspersed with regions of tall open eucalypt (wet sclerophyll) forest. The type locality is Spurrs Rivulet, near Mother Logans Creek.
