= Cryptoforis absona =

Scientific classification
- Kingdom: Animalia
- Phylum: Arthropoda
- Subphylum: Chelicerata
- Class: Arachnida
- Order: Araneae
- Infraorder: Mygalomorphae
- Family: Idiopidae
- Genus: Cryptoforis
- Species: C. absona

Binomial name
- Cryptoforis absona Wilson, Raven, & Rix, 2021

Species of spider

Cryptoforis absona is a species of mygalomorph spider in the Idiopidae family. It is endemic to Australia. It was described in 2021 by Australian arachnologists Jeremy Wilson, Robert Raven and Michael Rix. The specific epithet absona comes from the Latin absonus ('discordant' or 'different'), with reference to the unique lack of the bifurcate clasping spur on the male tibia, compared with known congeners.

== Distribution and habitat ==
The species occurs in north-eastern New South Wales. The type locality is tall open eucalypt forest above 900 m elevation, in Spirabo State Forest in the Northern Tablelands.
