= Cryptoforis arenaria =

Scientific classification
- Kingdom: Animalia
- Phylum: Arthropoda
- Subphylum: Chelicerata
- Class: Arachnida
- Order: Araneae
- Infraorder: Mygalomorphae
- Family: Idiopidae
- Genus: Cryptoforis
- Species: C. arenaria

Binomial name
- Cryptoforis arenaria Wilson, Raven, & Rix, 2021

Species of spider

Cryptoforis arenaria is a species of mygalomorph spider in the Idiopidae family. It is endemic to Australia. It was described in 2021 by Australian arachnologists Jeremy Wilson, Robert Raven and Michael Rix. The specific epithet arenaria, from the Latin arenarius (‘of sand’), alludes to the type locality of Fraser Island – the largest sand island in the world.

== Distribution and habitat ==
The species occurs in south-eastern Queensland. The type locality is satinay and brushbox forest at Central Station on Fraser Island.
