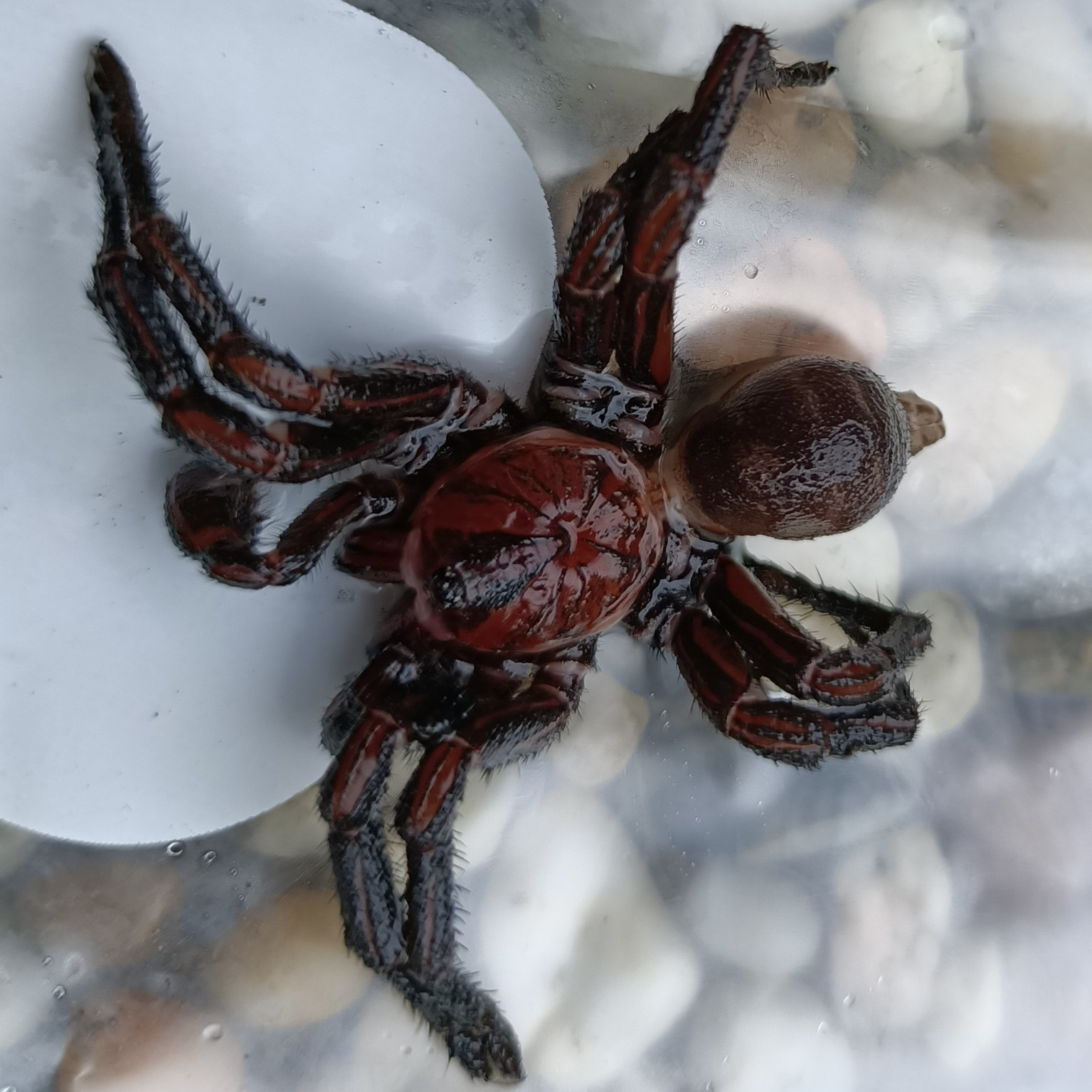

Scientific classification
- Kingdom: Animalia
- Phylum: Arthropoda
- Subphylum: Chelicerata
- Class: Arachnida
- Order: Araneae
- Infraorder: Mygalomorphae
- Family: Idiopidae
- Genus: Cryptoforis
- Species: C. hughesae

Binomial name
- Cryptoforis hughesae Wilson, Rix & Raven, 2020

= Cryptoforis hughesae =

Species of spider

Cryptoforis hughesae is a species of mygalomorph spider in the family Idiopidae. It is endemic to Australia and was first described in 2020 by Australian arachnologists Jeremy Wilson, Michael Rix and Robert Raven. The specific epithet hughesae honours evolutionary biologist Jane Hughes.

== Distribution and habitat ==
The species occurs in south-eastern Queensland throughout the open eucalypt forests of the Brisbane valley. The type locality is Toohey Forest, near Moorooka, a southern suburb of Brisbane.
