= Cryptoforis =

Scientific classification
- Kingdom: Animalia
- Phylum: Arthropoda
- Subphylum: Chelicerata
- Class: Arachnida
- Order: Araneae
- Infraorder: Mygalomorphae
- Family: Idiopidae
- Genus: Cryptoforis; Wilson, Rix & Raven, 2020

Type species
- C. hughesae Wilson, Rix & Raven, 2020

Species
- 18, see text

Genus of spiders

Cryptoforis is a genus of armoured trapdoor spiders. It is endemic to Australia. It was first described by Jeremy Wilson, Michael Rix and Robert Raven in 2020.

== Species ==
As of December 2021 the genus contained eighteen species from New South Wales (NSW), Queensland (QLD), Tasmania (TAS) or Victoria (VIC):

- C. absona Wilson, Raven & Rix, 2021 – NSW
- C. arenaria Wilson, Raven & Rix, 2021 – QLD
- C. cairncross Wilson, Raven & Rix, 2021 – QLD
- C. cassisi Wilson, Raven & Rix, 2021 – NSW
- C. celata Wilson, Raven & Rix, 2021 – NSW
- C. cooloola Wilson, Raven & Rix, 2021 – QLD
- C. fallax Wilson, Raven & Rix, 2021 – NSW
- C. grayi Wilson, Raven & Rix, 2021 – NSW
- C. hickmani Wilson, Raven & Rix, 2021 – TAS
- C. hughesae Wilson, Rix & Raven, 2020 (type) – QLD
- C. mainae Wilson, Raven & Rix, 2021 – NSW, QLD
- C. montana Wilson, Raven & Rix, 2021 – QLD
- C. monteithi Wilson, Raven & Rix, 2021 – QLD
- C. tasmanica (Hickman, 1928) – TAS
- C. victoriensis (Main, 1995) – VIC
- C. woondum Wilson, Raven & Rix, 2021 – QLD
- C. xenophila Wilson, Raven & Rix, 2021 – TAS
- C. zophera Wilson, Raven & Rix, 2021 – VIC

== See also ==
- Arbanitis
- Euoplos
