= Cryptoforis zophera =

Scientific classification
- Kingdom: Animalia
- Phylum: Arthropoda
- Subphylum: Chelicerata
- Class: Arachnida
- Order: Araneae
- Infraorder: Mygalomorphae
- Family: Idiopidae
- Genus: Cryptoforis
- Species: C. zophera

Binomial name
- Cryptoforis zophera Wilson, Raven, & Rix, 2021

Species of spider

Cryptoforis zophera is a species of mygalomorph spider in the Idiopidae family. It is endemic to Australia. It was described in 2021 by Australian arachnologists Jeremy Wilson, Robert Raven and Michael Rix. The specific epithet zophera (‘dusky’ or ‘gloomy’) refers to the gloomy, cool, temperate forests of the species’ range.

== Distribution and habitat ==
The species occurs in Victoria, in the Central Highlands region, in tall open eucalypt forest habitats. The type locality is Woodend in the Macedon Ranges.
