= Wodjil =

Wodjil or wodgil is a common name applied to a suite of Acacia species and, by extension, to the shrubland communities on acidic soils characterised by such species, found in the Wheatbelt and adjacent regions of south-west Western Australia. Wodjil species include:

- Acacia assimilis – fine-leaf wodjil
- Acacia neurophylla – broad-leaf wodjil
- Acacia resinimarginea – old-man wodjil
- Acacia stereophylla – stiff-leaf wodjil
- Acacia yorkrakinensis – soft-leaf wodjil
