= Cryptoforis cairncross =

Scientific classification
- Kingdom: Animalia
- Phylum: Arthropoda
- Subphylum: Chelicerata
- Class: Arachnida
- Order: Araneae
- Infraorder: Mygalomorphae
- Family: Idiopidae
- Genus: Cryptoforis
- Species: C. cairncross

Binomial name
- Cryptoforis cairncross Wilson, Raven, & Rix, 2021

Species of spider

Cryptoforis cairncross is a species of mygalomorph spider in the Idiopidae family. It is endemic to Australia. It was described in 2021 by Australian arachnologists Jeremy Wilson, Robert Raven and Michael Rix. The specific epithet cairncross refers to the type locality.

== Distribution and habitat ==
The species occurs in south-eastern Queensland. The type locality is rainforest in the Mary Cairncross Reserve, near Maleny in the Blackall Range.
