= Cryptoforis xenophila =

Scientific classification
- Kingdom: Animalia
- Phylum: Arthropoda
- Subphylum: Chelicerata
- Class: Arachnida
- Order: Araneae
- Infraorder: Mygalomorphae
- Family: Idiopidae
- Genus: Cryptoforis
- Species: C. xenophila

Binomial name
- Cryptoforis xenophila Wilson, Raven, & Rix, 2021

Species of spider

Cryptoforis xenophila is a species of mygalomorph spider in the Idiopidae family. It is endemic to Australia. It was described in 2021 by Australian arachnologists Jeremy Wilson, Robert Raven and Michael Rix. The specific epithet xenophila (‘stranger-lover’) alludes to the presence of the species in and around the city of Launceston.

== Distribution and habitat ==
The species occurs in north-eastern Tasmania, in the Northern Midlands region, in open eucalypt forest and tall open eucalypt (wet sclerophyll) forest habitats. The type locality is Launceston.
