= B. aurea =

B. aurea may refer to:

- Bartonia aurea, an ornamental plant species
- Bellastraea aurea, a sea snail species
- Blakistonia aurea, a spider species in the genus Blakistonia found in South Australia
- Brugmansia aurea, a plant species endemic to Ecuador

== Synonyms ==
- Bambusa aurea, a synonym for Phyllostachys aurea, a bamboo species

== See also ==
- Aurea (disambiguation)
