= Cryptoforis mainae =

Scientific classification
- Kingdom: Animalia
- Phylum: Arthropoda
- Subphylum: Chelicerata
- Class: Arachnida
- Order: Araneae
- Infraorder: Mygalomorphae
- Family: Idiopidae
- Genus: Cryptoforis
- Species: C. mainae

Binomial name
- Cryptoforis mainae Wilson, Raven, & Rix, 2021

Species of spider

Cryptoforis mainae is a species of mygalomorph spider in the Idiopidae family. It is endemic to Australia. It was described in 2021 by Australian arachnologists Jeremy Wilson, Robert Raven and Michael Rix. The specific epithet mainae honours Australian arachnologist Barbara York Main for her contributions to Australian arachnology, especially the study of mygalomorph spiders.

== Distribution and habitat ==
The species occurs in the rainforests and tall eucalypt forests of the Scenic Rim of south-eastern Queensland and north-eastern New South Wales. The type locality is Tamborine Mountain.
