= Cryptoforis celata =

Scientific classification
- Kingdom: Animalia
- Phylum: Arthropoda
- Subphylum: Chelicerata
- Class: Arachnida
- Order: Araneae
- Infraorder: Mygalomorphae
- Family: Idiopidae
- Genus: Cryptoforis
- Species: C. celata

Binomial name
- Cryptoforis celata Wilson, Raven, & Rix, 2021

Species of spider

Cryptoforis celata is a species of mygalomorph spider in the Idiopidae family. It is endemic to Australia. It was described in 2021 by Australian arachnologists Jeremy Wilson, Robert Raven and Michael Rix. The specific epithet celata comes from the Latin celatus ('concealed' or 'hidden'), with reference to the species’ highly camouflaged burrow entrance.

== Distribution and habitat ==
The species occurs in north-eastern New South Wales where the habitat is dominated by open eucalypt forest, with patches of rainforest and vine-scrub. The type locality is Madmans Creek Flora Reserve, near Woolgoolga in the Mid North Coast region.
