= Erigeron angustatus =

Scientific classification
- Kingdom: Plantae
- Clade: Tracheophytes
- Clade: Angiosperms
- Clade: Eudicots
- Clade: Asterids
- Order: Asterales
- Family: Asteraceae
- Genus: Erigeron
- Species: E. angustatus

Binomial name
- Erigeron angustatus (A.Gray) Greene

Synonyms
- Erigeron greenei G.L.Nesom, nom. superfl.; Erigeron inornatus var. angustatus A.Gray; Erigeron reductus var. angustatus (A.Gray) G.L.Nesom

Species of flowering plant

Erigeron angustatus, synonym Erigeron greenei, is a North American species of flowering plant in the family Asteraceae. Based on the superfluous synonym E. greenei, it is known by the common name Greene's narrow-leaved daisy.

== Description ==
Erigeron angustatus is a perennial herb up to 90 cm (3 feet) tall, producing a large taproot. Its leaves are narrow, up to 60 mm (2.4 inches) long but less than 2 mm (0.08 inches) across. The plant sometimes produces only one flower head per stem, sometimes groups of as many as five. Each head contains as many yellow disc florets but no ray florets. The species grows in open coniferous woodlands, frequently in serpentine soil.

== Taxonomy ==
The species was first described by Asa Gray in 1884 as a variety of Erigeron inornatus, E. inornatus var. angustatus. In 1885, Edward Lee Greene raised the variety to the full species Erigeron angustatus. In 1992, Guy L. Nesom made it a variety of Erigeron reductus, E. reductus var. angustatus. Then in 2004, Nesom published the replacement name Erigeron greenei, in the belief that Erigeron angustatus had already been published before Greene's use. As of January 2026, the International Plant Names Index regarded Nesom's species name as superfluous. Plants of the World Online agreed, regarding Erigeron greenei as a superfluous synonym of Erigeron angustatus.

== Distribution ==
Erigeron angustatus is an uncommon species with a restricted range. It has been found only in California in the region north of San Francisco Bay, from Sonoma and Napa Counties north as far as Siskiyou County.
