= Bungulla bertmaini =

Scientific classification
- Kingdom: Animalia
- Phylum: Arthropoda
- Subphylum: Chelicerata
- Class: Arachnida
- Order: Araneae
- Infraorder: Mygalomorphae
- Family: Idiopidae
- Genus: Bungulla
- Species: B. bertmaini

Binomial name
- Bungulla bertmaini Rix, Main, Raven & Harvey, 2017

Species of spider

Bungulla bertmaini is a species of mygalomorph spider in the Idiopidae family. It is endemic to Australia. It was described in 2017 by Australian arachnologists Michael Rix, Barbara York Main, Robert Raven and Mark Harvey.

== Distribution and habitat ==
The species is broadly distributed in Western Australia, with its range extending southwards from the arid Pilbara shrublands, through the Carnarvon, Yalgoo, Murchison and Gascoyne bioregions, to the northern Avon Wheatbelt and Coolgardie bioregions. The type locality is Deception Hill, 100 km north of Koolyanobbing.
