= Blakistonia newtoni =

Scientific classification
- Kingdom: Animalia
- Phylum: Arthropoda
- Subphylum: Chelicerata
- Class: Arachnida
- Order: Araneae
- Infraorder: Mygalomorphae
- Family: Idiopidae
- Genus: Blakistonia
- Species: B. newtoni

Binomial name
- Blakistonia newtoni Harrison, Rix, Harvey & Austin, 2018

Species of spider

Blakistonia newtoni is a species of mygalomorph spider in the Idiopidae family. It is endemic to Australia. It was described in 2018 by Australian arachnologists Sophie Harrison, Michael Rix, Mark Harvey and Andrew Austin. The specific epithet newtoni honours Mark Newton for promoting South Australia's invertebrate fauna to the general public and for the supply of specimens and images.

== Distribution and habitat ==
The species occurs in the Gawler Ranges of south-western South Australia. The type locality is a rocky hill slope with Triodia vegetation, in the Hiltaba Nature Reserve, adjoining the Gawler Ranges National Park.
