= Bungulla fusca =

Scientific classification
- Kingdom: Animalia
- Phylum: Arthropoda
- Subphylum: Chelicerata
- Class: Arachnida
- Order: Araneae
- Infraorder: Mygalomorphae
- Family: Idiopidae
- Genus: Bungulla
- Species: B. fusca

Binomial name
- Bungulla fusca Rix, Raven & Harvey, 2018

Species of spider

Bungulla fusca is a species of mygalomorph spider in the Idiopidae family. It is endemic to Australia. It was described in 2018 by Australian arachnologists Michael Rix, Robert Raven and Mark Harvey. The specific epithet fusca comes from the Latin for “dark“ or “dusky“, with reference to the spiders’ dark brown body colouration.

== Distribution and habitat ==
The species occurs on the south coast of Western Australia in the Esperance Plains and south-eastern Mallee bioregions, from near Munglinup eastwards to Coolinup NatureReserve. The type locality is the junction of Neds Corner and Yerritup Roads.
