= Blakistonia parva =

Scientific classification
- Kingdom: Animalia
- Phylum: Arthropoda
- Subphylum: Chelicerata
- Class: Arachnida
- Order: Araneae
- Infraorder: Mygalomorphae
- Family: Idiopidae
- Genus: Blakistonia
- Species: B. parva

Binomial name
- Blakistonia parva Harrison, Rix, Harvey & Austin, 2018

Species of spider

Blakistonia parva is a species of mygalomorph spider in the Idiopidae family. It is endemic to Australia. It was described in 2018 by Australian arachnologists Sophie Harrison, Michael Rix, Mark Harvey and Andrew Austin. The specific epithet parva comes from the Latin for "small’, with reference to its size relative to other Blakistonia species.

== Distribution and habitat ==
The species occurs in northern South Australia. The type locality is Beresford Railway Station, a now derelict station on the former Central Australia Railway, south-west of Lake Eyre and 140 km north of Andamooka.
