= Blakistonia hortoni =

Scientific classification
- Kingdom: Animalia
- Phylum: Arthropoda
- Subphylum: Chelicerata
- Class: Arachnida
- Order: Araneae
- Infraorder: Mygalomorphae
- Family: Idiopidae
- Genus: Blakistonia
- Species: B. hortoni

Binomial name
- Blakistonia hortoni Harrison, Rix, Harvey & Austin, 2018

Species of spider

Blakistonia hortoni is a species of mygalomorph spider in the Idiopidae family. It is endemic to Australia and was described in 2018 by Australian arachnologists Sophie Harrison, Michael Rix, Mark Harvey and Andrew Austin. The specific epithet hortoni commemorates Benjamin Horton for his dedication to wildlife education and conservation and for rescuing animals during the 2015 Sampson Flat bushfires.

== Distribution and habitat ==
The species is found in south-eastern South Australia. The type locality is Mount Crawford Forest Reserve in the Mount Lofty Ranges.
