= Euoplos kalbarri =

Scientific classification
- Kingdom: Animalia
- Phylum: Arthropoda
- Subphylum: Chelicerata
- Class: Arachnida
- Order: Araneae
- Infraorder: Mygalomorphae
- Family: Idiopidae
- Genus: Euoplos
- Species: E. kalbarri

Binomial name
- Euoplos kalbarri Rix, Wilson & Harvey, 2019

Species of spider

Euoplos kalbarri is a species of mygalomorph spider in the Idiopidae family. It is endemic to Australia. It was described in 2019 by Australian arachnologists Michael Rix, Jeremy Wilson and Mark Harvey. The specific epithet kalbarri refers to the type locality.

== Distribution and habitat ==
The species occurs in south-west Western Australia in the north-western Geraldton Sandplains bioregion. The type locality is Kalbarri, some 590 km north of Perth.
