= Bungulla keirani =

Scientific classification
- Kingdom: Animalia
- Phylum: Arthropoda
- Subphylum: Chelicerata
- Class: Arachnida
- Order: Araneae
- Infraorder: Mygalomorphae
- Family: Idiopidae
- Genus: Bungulla
- Species: B. keirani

Binomial name
- Bungulla keirani Rix, Raven & Harvey, 2018

Species of spider

Bungulla keirani is a species of mygalomorph spider in the Idiopidae family. It is endemic to Australia. It was described in 2018 by Australian arachnologists Michael Rix, Robert Raven and Mark Harvey. The specific epithet keirani honours Keiran McNamara (1954–2013) for his efforts in securing funding for the Southern Carnarvon Basin Survey.

== Distribution and habitat ==
The species occurs in Western Australia in the southern Carnarvon, north-western Yalgoo and northern Geraldton Sandplains bioregions, from the Peron Peninsula to Zuytdorp. The type locality is Nanga Station, near Shark Bay.
