= Bungulla bidgemia =

Scientific classification
- Kingdom: Animalia
- Phylum: Arthropoda
- Subphylum: Chelicerata
- Class: Arachnida
- Order: Araneae
- Infraorder: Mygalomorphae
- Family: Idiopidae
- Genus: Bungulla
- Species: B. bidgemia

Binomial name
- Bungulla bidgemia Rix, Raven & Harvey, 2018

Species of spider

Bungulla bidgemia is a species of mygalomorph spider in the Idiopidae family. It is endemic to Australia. It was described in 2018 by Australian arachnologists Michael Rix, Robert Raven and Mark Harvey. The specific epithet bidgemia refers to the type locality.

== Distribution and habitat ==
The species occurs in the far eastern Carnarvon xeric shrublands bioregion of Western Australia. The type locality is Bidgemia Station, near Gascoyne Junction.
