= Bungulla hamelinensis =

Scientific classification
- Kingdom: Animalia
- Phylum: Arthropoda
- Subphylum: Chelicerata
- Class: Arachnida
- Order: Araneae
- Infraorder: Mygalomorphae
- Family: Idiopidae
- Genus: Bungulla
- Species: B. hamelinensis

Binomial name
- Bungulla hamelinensis Rix, Raven & Harvey, 2018

Species of spider

Bungulla hamelinensis is a species of mygalomorph spider in the Idiopidae family. It is endemic to Australia. It was described in 2018 by Australian arachnologists Michael Rix, Robert Raven and Mark Harvey. The specific epithet hamelinensis refers to the type locality.

== Distribution and habitat ==
The species occurs in Western Australia in the Carnarvon bioregion. The type locality is Nanga Station, near Hamelin Pool.
