= Blakistonia bassi =

Scientific classification
- Kingdom: Animalia
- Phylum: Arthropoda
- Subphylum: Chelicerata
- Class: Arachnida
- Order: Araneae
- Infraorder: Mygalomorphae
- Family: Idiopidae
- Genus: Blakistonia
- Species: B. bassi

Binomial name
- Blakistonia bassi Harrison, Rix, Harvey & Austin, 2018

Species of spider

Blakistonia bassi is a species of mygalomorph spider in the Idiopidae family. It is endemic to Australia. It was described in 2018 by Australian arachnologists Sophie Harrison, Michael Rix, Mark Harvey and Andrew Austin. The specific epithet bassi honours Daniel Bass for his research support.

== Distribution and habitat ==
The species occurs in south-eastern South Australia. The type locality is Ashton in the Mount Lofty Ranges.
