= Euoplos grandis =

Scientific classification
- Kingdom: Animalia
- Phylum: Arthropoda
- Subphylum: Chelicerata
- Class: Arachnida
- Order: Araneae
- Infraorder: Mygalomorphae
- Family: Idiopidae
- Genus: Euoplos
- Species: E. grandis

Binomial name
- Euoplos grandis Wilson & Rix, 2019

Species of spider

Euoplos grandis, also known as the Toowoomba trapdoor spider, is a species of mygalomorph spider in the Idiopidae family. It is endemic to Australia. It was described in 2019 by Australian arachnologists Jeremy Wilson, and Michael Rix.

== Distribution and habitat ==
The species occurs in south-east Queensland in the Darling Downs region. The type locality is west of Dalby in the Western Downs.
