= Bungulla parva =

Scientific classification
- Kingdom: Animalia
- Phylum: Arthropoda
- Subphylum: Chelicerata
- Class: Arachnida
- Order: Araneae
- Infraorder: Mygalomorphae
- Family: Idiopidae
- Genus: Bungulla
- Species: B. parva

Binomial name
- Bungulla parva Rix, Raven & Harvey, 2018

Species of spider

Bungulla parva is a species of mygalomorph spider in the Idiopidae family. It is endemic to Australia. It was described in 2018 by Australian arachnologists Michael Rix, Robert Raven and Mark Harvey. The specific epithet parva comes from the Latin for “little”, with reference to the relatively small size of the spiders.

== Distribution and habitat ==
The species occurs in south-west Western Australia in the northern Jarrah Forest bioregion. The type locality is Mount Cooke, on the Darling Scarp, near Jarrahdale.
