= Bungulla sampeyae =

Scientific classification
- Kingdom: Animalia
- Phylum: Arthropoda
- Subphylum: Chelicerata
- Class: Arachnida
- Order: Araneae
- Infraorder: Mygalomorphae
- Family: Idiopidae
- Genus: Bungulla
- Species: B. sampeyae

Binomial name
- Bungulla sampeyae Rix, Raven & Harvey, 2018

Species of spider

Bungulla sampeyae is a species of mygalomorph spider in the Idiopidae family. It is endemic to Australia. It was described in 2018 by Australian arachnologists Michael Rix, Robert Raven and Mark Harvey. The specific epithet sampeyae honours Alison Sampey for her efforts during the fieldwork of the Southern Carnarvon Survey, and for her assistance in the analysis and publication of the data.

== Distribution and habitat ==
The species occurs in Western Australia in the north-western Yalgoo and northern Geraldton Sandplains bioregions, in the vicinity of Shark Bay, from the Carrarang Peninsula southwards to Zuytdorp. The type locality is Zuytdorp.
