= Bungulla bella =

Scientific classification
- Kingdom: Animalia
- Phylum: Arthropoda
- Subphylum: Chelicerata
- Class: Arachnida
- Order: Araneae
- Infraorder: Mygalomorphae
- Family: Idiopidae
- Genus: Bungulla
- Species: B. bella

Binomial name
- Bungulla bella Rix, Raven & Harvey, 2018

Species of spider

Bungulla bella is a species of mygalomorph spider in the Idiopidae family. It is endemic to Australia. It was described in 2018 by Australian arachnologists Michael Rix, Robert Raven and Mark Harvey. The specific epithet bella comes from the Latin for "pretty" or "lovely", with reference to the attractive colouration – beige, with dark purple-brown markings – of the abdomen of the female holotype.

== Distribution and habitat ==
The species occurs in the south-central Murchison bioregion of Western Australia. The type locality is Mount Richardson, 226 km south-east of Mount Magnet.
