= Bungulla banksia =

Scientific classification
- Kingdom: Animalia
- Phylum: Arthropoda
- Subphylum: Chelicerata
- Class: Arachnida
- Order: Araneae
- Infraorder: Mygalomorphae
- Family: Idiopidae
- Genus: Bungulla
- Species: B. banksia

Binomial name
- Bungulla banksia Rix, Raven & Harvey, 2018

Species of spider

Bungulla banksia is a species of mygalomorph spider in the Idiopidae family. It is endemic to Australia. It was described in 2018 by Australian arachnologists Michael Rix, Robert Raven and Mark Harvey. The specific epithet banksia refers to the species’ preferred habitat of kwongan Banksia heathland on sandplains.

== Distribution and habitat ==
The species occurs in the Geraldton Sandplains bioregion of south-west Western Australia. The type locality is on the Cooljarloo mining lease, in low Banksia woodland.
