= Acacia karina =

Scientific classification
- Kingdom: Plantae
- Clade: Embryophytes
- Clade: Tracheophytes
- Clade: Spermatophytes
- Clade: Angiosperms
- Clade: Eudicots
- Clade: Rosids
- Order: Fabales
- Family: Fabaceae
- Subfamily: Caesalpinioideae
- Clade: Mimosoid clade
- Genus: Acacia
- Species: A. karina

Binomial name
- Acacia karina Maslin & Buscumb
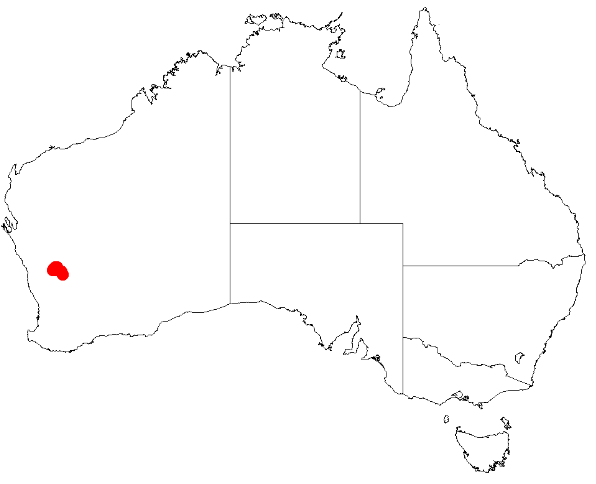
- Occurrence data from AVH

Species of legume

Acacia karina, commonly known as Karina's wattle, is a species of flowering plant in the family Fabaceae and is endemic to a small area in the south-west of Western Australia. It is an openly branched shrub with thread-like, terete phyllodes that are continuous with the branchlets, spikes of light golden yellow flowers and thinly leathery to firmly papery pods appearing somewhat like a string of beads.

== Description ==
Acacia karina is an openly branched shrub that typically grows to a height of 1–3 m (3 ft 3 in – 9 ft 10 in) and has smooth, grey bark. The branchlets are light brown or reddish brown and sometimes have hairs pressed against the surface. The phyllodes are ascending to erect, thread-like, terete, mostly 100–280 mm (3.9–11.0 in) long, 0.6–1 mm (0.024–0.039 in) wide, straight to slightly curved and continuous with the branches. The phyllodes are more or less glabrous and green with eight longitudinal veins separated by a distinct furrow. The flowers are borne in spikes 15–60 mm (0.59–2.36 in) long, 3.5–5 mm (0.14–0.20 in) wide on peduncles 3–7.5 mm (0.12–0.30 in) long. Flowering occurs between May and July, and the pods are thinly leathery to firmly papery, more or less straight to slightly curved, 40–200 mm (1.6–7.9 in) long, 4–5 mm (0.16–0.20 in) wide and light brown, appearing somewhat like a string of beads. The seeds are oblong, to elliptic or slightly egg-shaped, 3.0–3.5 mm (0.12–0.14 in) long and centrally pitted, with a conspicuous, creamy white to brown aril.

== Taxonomy ==
Acacia karina was first formally described in 2007 by Bruce Maslin and Carrie Buscumb in the journal Nuytsia from specimens collected east of Morawa by Maslin in 2006. The specific epithet (karina) honours Karina Knight, who held a thirty-year career as manager of the Western Australian Herbarium and contributed to the systematics of the genus Acacia.

== Distribution and habitat ==
Karina's wattle grows in soils over banded ironstone, sometimes over granite, in shrubland and is only known from the Blue Hills Range and nearby areas east of Morawa and in the Mount Gibson area in the south-west of Western Australia.

The Western Australian Herbarium does not recognise this species.

== See also ==
- List of Acacia species
