= Euoplos cornishi =

Scientific classification
- Kingdom: Animalia
- Phylum: Arthropoda
- Subphylum: Chelicerata
- Class: Arachnida
- Order: Araneae
- Infraorder: Mygalomorphae
- Family: Idiopidae
- Genus: Euoplos
- Species: E. cornishi

Binomial name
- Euoplos cornishi Rix, Wilson & Harvey, 2019

Species of spider

Euoplos cornishi is a species of mygalomorph spider in the Idiopidae family. It is endemic to Australia. It was described in 2019 by Australian arachnologists Michael Rix, Jeremy Wilson and Mark Harvey. The specific epithet cornishi honours John Cornish who collected the type specimen in 2011.

== Distribution and habitat ==
The species occurs in south-west Western Australia in the Avon Wheatbelt bioregion. The type locality is Grass Valley, near Northam.
