= Blakistonia mainae =

Scientific classification
- Kingdom: Animalia
- Phylum: Arthropoda
- Subphylum: Chelicerata
- Class: Arachnida
- Order: Araneae
- Infraorder: Mygalomorphae
- Family: Idiopidae
- Genus: Blakistonia
- Species: B. mainae

Binomial name
- Blakistonia mainae Harrison, Rix, Harvey & Austin, 2018

Species of spider

Blakistonia mainae is a species of mygalomorph spider in the Idiopidae family. It is endemic to Australia. It was described in 2018 by Australian arachnologists Sophie Harrison, Michael Rix, Mark Harvey and Andrew Austin. The specific epithet mainae honours arachnologist Barbara York Main, who first collected Blakistonia specimens at the type locality in 1986, for her lifelong commitment to the study of Australian trapdoor spiders.

== Distribution and habitat ==
The species occurs on the south coast of Western Australia. The type locality is Mount Ragged in the Cape Arid National Park.
