= Blakistonia nullarborensis =

Scientific classification
- Kingdom: Animalia
- Phylum: Arthropoda
- Subphylum: Chelicerata
- Class: Arachnida
- Order: Araneae
- Infraorder: Mygalomorphae
- Family: Idiopidae
- Genus: Blakistonia
- Species: B. nullarborensis

Binomial name
- Blakistonia nullarborensis Harrison, Rix, Harvey & Austin, 2018

Species of spider

Blakistonia nullarborensis is a species of mygalomorph spider in the Idiopidae family. It is endemic to Australia. It was described in 2018 by Australian arachnologists Sophie Harrison, Michael Rix, Mark Harvey and Andrew Austin. The specific epithet nullarborensis refers to the type locality.

== Distribution and habitat ==
The species occurs on the south coast of Western Australia. The type locality is east of Madura on the Nullarbor Plain.
