= Euoplos raveni =

Scientific classification
- Kingdom: Animalia
- Phylum: Arthropoda
- Subphylum: Chelicerata
- Class: Arachnida
- Order: Araneae
- Infraorder: Mygalomorphae
- Family: Idiopidae
- Genus: Euoplos
- Species: E. raveni

Binomial name
- Euoplos raveni Wilson & Rix, 2021

Species of spider

Euoplos raveni is a species of mygalomorph spider in the Idiopidae family. It is endemic to Australia. It was described in 2021 by Australian arachnologists Jeremy Wilson and Michael Rix. The specific epithet raveni honours Australian arachnologist Robert Raven.

== Distribution and habitat ==
The species occurs in south-east Queensland in the greater Brisbane area, south of the Brisbane River. The type locality is riparian wet sclerophyll forest in Burbank.
