= Blakistonia carnarvon =

Scientific classification
- Kingdom: Animalia
- Phylum: Arthropoda
- Subphylum: Chelicerata
- Class: Arachnida
- Order: Araneae
- Infraorder: Mygalomorphae
- Family: Idiopidae
- Genus: Blakistonia
- Species: B. carnarvon

Binomial name
- Blakistonia carnarvon Harrison, Rix, Harvey & Austin, 2018

Species of spider

Blakistonia carnarvon is a species of mygalomorph spider in the Idiopidae family. It is endemic to Australia. It was described in 2018 by Australian arachnologists Sophie Harrison, Michael Rix, Mark Harvey and Andrew Austin. The specific epithet carnarvon refers to the type locality.

== Distribution and habitat ==
The species occurs in Central Queensland in brigalow woodland. The type locality is Carnarvon Station Reserve.
