= Cryptoforis tasmanica =

Scientific classification
- Kingdom: Animalia
- Phylum: Arthropoda
- Subphylum: Chelicerata
- Class: Arachnida
- Order: Araneae
- Infraorder: Mygalomorphae
- Family: Idiopidae
- Genus: Cryptoforis
- Species: C. tasmanica

Binomial name
- Cryptoforis tasmanica (Hickman, 1928)

Synonyms
- Aganippe tasmanica Hickman, 1928; Euoplos tasmanica (Hickman, 1928)

Species of spider

Cryptoforis tasmanica is a species of mygalomorph spider in the Idiopidae family. It is endemic to Australia. It was described in 1928 by Australian arachnologist Vernon Victor Hickman. The specific epithet tasmanica refers to the species’ range.

== Distribution and habitat ==
The species occurs in south-eastern Tasmania in open eucalypt forest and supralittoral habitats. Most specimens have been collected from the foothills of Mount Wellington, in the south-western suburbs of Hobart, as well as from the banks of the Derwent River. The type locality is Prince of Wales Bay, Derwent Park.

== Behaviour ==
The spiders are fossorial, terrestrial predators. They construct burrows with trapdoors in banks above high tide level.
