= Bungulla kendricki =

Scientific classification
- Kingdom: Animalia
- Phylum: Arthropoda
- Subphylum: Chelicerata
- Class: Arachnida
- Order: Araneae
- Infraorder: Mygalomorphae
- Family: Idiopidae
- Genus: Bungulla
- Species: B. kendricki

Binomial name
- Bungulla kendricki Rix, Raven & Harvey, 2018

Species of spider

Bungulla kendricki is a species of mygalomorph spider in the Idiopidae family. It is endemic to Australia. It was described in 2018 by Australian arachnologists Michael Rix, Robert Raven and Mark Harvey. The specific epithet kendricki honours George Kendrick (1929–2014) for collecting paratype specimens, and for his contributions to the study of fossil invertebrates.

== Distribution and habitat ==
The species occurs in Western Australia in the north-west Gascoyne bioregion. The type locality is the Barlee Range Nature Reserve.
