= Bungulla weld =

Scientific classification
- Kingdom: Animalia
- Phylum: Arthropoda
- Subphylum: Chelicerata
- Class: Arachnida
- Order: Araneae
- Infraorder: Mygalomorphae
- Family: Idiopidae
- Genus: Bungulla
- Species: B. weld

Binomial name
- Bungulla weld Rix, Raven & Harvey, 2018

Species of spider

Bungulla weld is a species of mygalomorph spider in the Idiopidae family. It is endemic to Australia. It was described in 2018 by Australian arachnologists Michael Rix, Robert Raven and Mark Harvey. The specific epithet weld refers to the type locality.

== Distribution and habitat ==
The species occurs in the Weld Range of Western Australia, in the western Murchison bioregion. The type locality is the Weld Range North mine lease, 64 km south-west of Meekatharra.
