= Blakistonia gemmelli =

Scientific classification
- Kingdom: Animalia
- Phylum: Arthropoda
- Subphylum: Chelicerata
- Class: Arachnida
- Order: Araneae
- Infraorder: Mygalomorphae
- Family: Idiopidae
- Genus: Blakistonia
- Species: B. gemmelli

Binomial name
- Blakistonia gemmelli Harrison, Rix, Harvey & Austin, 2018

Species of spider

Blakistonia gemmelli is a species of mygalomorph spider in the Idiopidae family. It is endemic to Australia. It was described in 2018 by Australian arachnologists Sophie Harrison, Michael Rix, Mark Harvey and Andrew Austin. The specific epithet gemmelli honours Mike Gemmell for his long-term interest in trapdoor spiders.

== Distribution and habitat ==
The species occurs in the Flinders Ranges of South Australia. The type locality is Weetootla Well in the Vulkathunha-Gammon Ranges National Park.
