= Blakistonia birksi =

Scientific classification
- Kingdom: Animalia
- Phylum: Arthropoda
- Subphylum: Chelicerata
- Class: Arachnida
- Order: Araneae
- Infraorder: Mygalomorphae
- Family: Idiopidae
- Genus: Blakistonia
- Species: B. birksi

Binomial name
- Blakistonia birksi Harrison, Rix, Harvey & Austin, 2018

Species of spider

Blakistonia birksi is a species of mygalomorph spider in the Idiopidae family. It is endemic to Australia. It was described in 2018 by Australian arachnologists Sophie Harrison, Michael Rix, Mark Harvey and Andrew Austin. The specific epithet birksi honours Nicholas Birks for his assistance in collecting and photographing specimens.

== Distribution and habitat ==
The species occurs in south-eastern South Australia and western Victoria, in habitats ranging from sandy mallee-heath to sclerophyll forest. The type locality is Ngarkat Conservation Park. It has also been recorded from the Mount Lofty Ranges and the Grampians National Park.
