= Blakistonia wingellina =

Scientific classification
- Kingdom: Animalia
- Phylum: Arthropoda
- Subphylum: Chelicerata
- Class: Arachnida
- Order: Araneae
- Infraorder: Mygalomorphae
- Family: Idiopidae
- Genus: Blakistonia
- Species: B. wingellina

Binomial name
- Blakistonia wingellina Harrison, Rix, Harvey & Austin, 2018

Species of spider

Blakistonia wingellina is a species of mygalomorph spider in the Idiopidae family. It is endemic to Australia. It was described in 2018 by Australian arachnologists Sophie Harrison, Michael Rix, Mark Harvey and Andrew Austin. The specific epithet wingellina refers to the type locality.

== Distribution and habitat ==
The species occurs in the Goldfields–Esperance region of Western Australia. The type locality is the Wingellina Aboriginal community, near the state border with north-western South Australia.
