= Euoplos regalis =

Scientific classification
- Kingdom: Animalia
- Phylum: Arthropoda
- Subphylum: Chelicerata
- Class: Arachnida
- Order: Araneae
- Infraorder: Mygalomorphae
- Family: Idiopidae
- Genus: Euoplos
- Species: E. regalis

Binomial name
- Euoplos regalis Wilson & Rix, 2021

Species of spider

Euoplos regalis, also known as the regal trapdoor spider or the regal golden trapdoor spider, is a species of mygalomorph spider in the Idiopidae family. It is endemic to Australia. It was described in 2021 by Australian arachnologists Jeremy Wilson and Michael Rix.

== Distribution and habitat ==
The species occurs in south-east Queensland in the greater Brisbane area, in wet sclerophyll and rainforest habitats. Type localities include Mount Glorious and Mount Nebo in the City of Moreton Bay.
