= Blakistonia raveni =

Scientific classification
- Kingdom: Animalia
- Phylum: Arthropoda
- Subphylum: Chelicerata
- Class: Arachnida
- Order: Araneae
- Infraorder: Mygalomorphae
- Family: Idiopidae
- Genus: Blakistonia
- Species: B. raveni

Binomial name
- Blakistonia raveni Harrison, Rix, Harvey & Austin, 2018

Species of spider

Blakistonia raveni is a species of mygalomorph spider in the Idiopidae family. It is endemic to Australia. It was described in 2018 by Australian arachnologists Sophie Harrison, Michael Rix, Mark Harvey and Andrew Austin. The specific epithet raveni honours arachnologist Robert Raven for his contributions to arachnid taxonomy.

== Distribution and habitat ==
The species occurs in Central West Queensland in open forest habitats. The type locality is the summit of the Drummond Ranges, near Alpha, about 400 km west of Rockhampton.
