= Bungulla iota =

Scientific classification
- Kingdom: Animalia
- Phylum: Arthropoda
- Subphylum: Chelicerata
- Class: Arachnida
- Order: Araneae
- Infraorder: Mygalomorphae
- Family: Idiopidae
- Genus: Bungulla
- Species: B. iota

Binomial name
- Bungulla iota Rix, Raven & Harvey, 2018

Species of spider

Bungulla iota is a species of mygalomorph spider in the Idiopidae family. It is endemic to Australia. It was described in 2018 by Australian arachnologists Michael Rix, Robert Raven and Mark Harvey. The specific epithet iota comes from the Greek for “anything very small”, with reference to the relatively small size of the spiders.

== Distribution and habitat ==
The species occurs in Western Australia in the southern Carnarvon bioregion. The type locality is Woodleigh Station.
