= Euoplos ballidu =

Scientific classification
- Kingdom: Animalia
- Phylum: Arthropoda
- Subphylum: Chelicerata
- Class: Arachnida
- Order: Araneae
- Infraorder: Mygalomorphae
- Family: Idiopidae
- Genus: Euoplos
- Species: E. ballidu

Binomial name
- Euoplos ballidu (Main, 2000)

Synonyms
- Arbanitis ballidu Main, 2000

Species of spider

Euoplos ballidu is a species of mygalomorph spider in the Idiopidae family. It is endemic to Australia. It was described in 2000 by Australian arachnologist Barbara York Main. The specific epithet ballidu refers to the type locality.

== Distribution and habitat ==
The species occurs in south-west Western Australia in the Avon Wheatbelt bioregion. The type locality is Ballidu, 217 km north of Perth, where the habitat is mixed open wodjil heath on yellow sand.
