= Bungulla keigheryi =

Scientific classification
- Kingdom: Animalia
- Phylum: Arthropoda
- Subphylum: Chelicerata
- Class: Arachnida
- Order: Araneae
- Infraorder: Mygalomorphae
- Family: Idiopidae
- Genus: Bungulla
- Species: B. keigheryi

Binomial name
- Bungulla keigheryi Rix, Raven & Harvey, 2018

Species of spider

Bungulla keigheryi is a species of mygalomorph spider in the Idiopidae family. It is endemic to Australia. It was described in 2018 by Australian arachnologists Michael Rix, Robert Raven and Mark Harvey. The specific epithet keigheryi honours Greg Keighery for his support of the Southern Carnarvon Basin Survey and the study of Australian biodiversity.

== Distribution and habitat ==
The species occurs in Western Australia in the far eastern Carnarvon bioregion. The type locality is Bidgemia Station, just south of the Gascoyne River.
