= Blakistonia tunstilli =

Scientific classification
- Kingdom: Animalia
- Phylum: Arthropoda
- Subphylum: Chelicerata
- Class: Arachnida
- Order: Araneae
- Infraorder: Mygalomorphae
- Family: Idiopidae
- Genus: Blakistonia
- Species: B. tunstilli

Binomial name
- Blakistonia tunstilli Harrison, Rix, Harvey & Austin, 2018

Species of spider

Blakistonia tunstilli is a species of mygalomorph spider in the Idiopidae family. It is endemic to Australia. It was described in 2018 by Australian arachnologists Sophie Harrison, Michael Rix, Mark Harvey and Andrew Austin. The specific epithet tunstilli honours Guy Tunstill for his dedication to teaching and preserving indigenous languages and for his knowledge of Australian wildlife.

== Distribution and habitat ==
The species occurs in central South Australia. The type locality is Relief Bore, Tallaringa Conservation Park, on the eastern fringe of the Great Victoria Desert.
