= Cryptoforis victoriensis =

Scientific classification
- Kingdom: Animalia
- Phylum: Arthropoda
- Subphylum: Chelicerata
- Class: Arachnida
- Order: Araneae
- Infraorder: Mygalomorphae
- Family: Idiopidae
- Genus: Cryptoforis
- Species: C. victoriensis

Binomial name
- Cryptoforis victoriensis (Main, 1995)

Synonyms
- Arbanitis victoriensis Main, 1995; Euoplos victoriensis (Main, 1995)

Species of spider

Cryptoforis victoriensis is a species of mygalomorph spider in the Idiopidae family. It is endemic to Australia. It was described in 1995 by Australian arachnologist Barbara York Main. The specific epithet victoriensis refers to the species’ range.

== Distribution and habitat ==
The species occurs in Victoria, in the Alpine region, where the habitat is mainly tall open eucalypt forest. The type locality is the Buffalo River Dam.
