= Bungulla laevigata =

Scientific classification
- Kingdom: Animalia
- Phylum: Arthropoda
- Subphylum: Chelicerata
- Class: Arachnida
- Order: Araneae
- Infraorder: Mygalomorphae
- Family: Idiopidae
- Genus: Bungulla
- Species: B. laevigata

Binomial name
- Bungulla laevigata Rix, Raven & Harvey, 2018

Species of spider

Bungulla laevigata is a species of mygalomorph spider in the Idiopidae family. It is endemic to Australia. It was described in 2018 by Australian arachnologists Michael Rix, Robert Raven and Mark Harvey. The specific epithet laevigata comes from the Latin for “smooth”, with reference to the smoothness of the carapace.

== Distribution and habitat ==
The species occurs in Western Australia in the far southern Carnarvon bioregion. The type locality is Nanga Station, 13 km south-west of Hamelin Pool.
