= Blakistonia plata =

Scientific classification
- Kingdom: Animalia
- Phylum: Arthropoda
- Subphylum: Chelicerata
- Class: Arachnida
- Order: Araneae
- Infraorder: Mygalomorphae
- Family: Idiopidae
- Genus: Blakistonia
- Species: B. plata

Binomial name
- Blakistonia plata Harrison, Rix, Harvey & Austin, 2018

Species of spider

Blakistonia plata is a species of mygalomorph spider in the Idiopidae family. It is endemic to Australia. It was described in 2018 by Australian arachnologists Sophie Harrison, Michael Rix, Mark Harvey and Andrew Austin. The specific epithet plata, Latin for "silver’’, alludes to the type locality by reference to the local silver mining industry.

== Distribution and habitat ==
The species occurs in south-east Queensland. The type locality is Texas, near Goondiwindi in the Darling Downs region, where the holotype was found in a tree clearing.
