= Bungulla westi =

Scientific classification
- Kingdom: Animalia
- Phylum: Arthropoda
- Subphylum: Chelicerata
- Class: Arachnida
- Order: Araneae
- Infraorder: Mygalomorphae
- Family: Idiopidae
- Genus: Bungulla
- Species: B. westi

Binomial name
- Bungulla westi Rix, Raven & Harvey, 2018

Species of spider

Bungulla westi is a species of mygalomorph spider in the Idiopidae family. It is endemic to Australia. It was described in 2018 by Australian arachnologists Michael Rix, Robert Raven and Mark Harvey. The specific epithet westi honours Paul West for his efforts during the fieldwork for the South Carnarvon Survey and for his assistance in the analysis and publication of the resulting data.

== Distribution and habitat ==
The species occurs in Western Australia, in the southern Carnarvon, Yalgoo and Geraldton Sandplains bioregions, from Meedo Station southwards to Zuytdorp. The type locality is Zuytdorp.
