= Mount Gibson =

Mount Gibson may refer to:

- Mount Gibson, Western Australia, located in the mid-west region of Western Australia
  - Mount Gibson Sanctuary, a large nature reserve in Western Australia
- Mount Gibson, Antarctica, in the Prince Charles Mountains of Antarctica
- Mount Gibson Iron, mining company operating the mine on Koolan Island, WA
