= Blakistonia pidax =

Scientific classification
- Kingdom: Animalia
- Phylum: Arthropoda
- Subphylum: Chelicerata
- Class: Arachnida
- Order: Araneae
- Infraorder: Mygalomorphae
- Family: Idiopidae
- Genus: Blakistonia
- Species: B. pidax

Binomial name
- Blakistonia pidax Harrison, Rix, Harvey & Austin, 2018

Species of spider

Blakistonia pidax is a species of mygalomorph spider in the Idiopidae family. It is endemic to Australia. It was described in 2018 by Australian arachnologists Sophie Harrison, Michael Rix, Mark Harvey and Andrew Austin. The specific epithet pidax, from the Greek for "spring", refers to the type locality.

== Distribution and habitat ==
The species occurs in northern South Australia. The type locality is Strangways Springs, south-west of Lake Eyre.
