= Blakistonia tariae =

Scientific classification
- Kingdom: Animalia
- Phylum: Arthropoda
- Subphylum: Chelicerata
- Class: Arachnida
- Order: Araneae
- Infraorder: Mygalomorphae
- Family: Idiopidae
- Genus: Blakistonia
- Species: B. tariae

Binomial name
- Blakistonia tariae Harrison, Rix, Harvey & Austin, 2018

Species of spider

Blakistonia tariae is a species of mygalomorph spider in the Idiopidae family. It is endemic to Australia. It was described in 2018 by Australian arachnologists Sophie Harrison, Michael Rix, Mark Harvey and Andrew Austin. The specific epithet tariae honours Tari Pawlyk for her environmental work in the Western Australian Goldfields and her love of the Esperance beaches.

== Distribution and habitat ==
The species occurs in south-west Western Australia. The type locality is Coolinup Nature Reserve, near Condingup. It has also been recorded from the Durokoppin Nature Reserve in the Wheatbelt.
