= Bungulla (spider) =

Scientific classification
- Kingdom: Animalia
- Phylum: Arthropoda
- Subphylum: Chelicerata
- Class: Arachnida
- Order: Araneae
- Infraorder: Mygalomorphae
- Family: Idiopidae
- Genus: Bungulla; Rix, Main, Raven & Harvey, 2017

Type species
- B. bertmaini Rix, Main, Raven & Harvey, 2017

Species
- 33, see text

Genus of spiders

Bungulla is a genus of Australian armoured trapdoor spiders first described by Michael Gordon Rix, Robert John Raven, Barbara York Main and Mark Stephen Harvey in 2017.

== Species ==
As of October 2025, this genus includes 33 species, all from Western Australia:

- Bungulla ajana Rix, Raven & Harvey, 2018
- Bungulla aplini Rix, Raven & Harvey, 2018
- Bungulla banksia Rix, Raven & Harvey, 2018
- Bungulla bella Rix, Raven & Harvey, 2018
- Bungulla bertmaini Rix, Main, Raven & Harvey, 2017
- Bungulla bidgemia Rix, Raven & Harvey, 2018
- Bungulla biota Rix, Raven & Harvey, 2018
- Bungulla bringo Rix, Raven & Harvey, 2018
- Bungulla burbidgei Rix, Raven & Harvey, 2018
- Bungulla dipsodes Rix, Raven & Harvey, 2018
- Bungulla disrupta Rix, Raven & Harvey, 2018
- Bungulla ferraria Rix, Raven & Harvey, 2018
- Bungulla fusca Rix, Raven & Harvey, 2018
- Bungulla gibba Rix, Raven & Harvey, 2018
- Bungulla hamelinensis Rix, Raven & Harvey, 2018
- Bungulla harrisonae Rix, Raven & Harvey, 2018
- Bungulla hillyerae Rix, Raven & Harvey, 2018
- Bungulla inermis Rix, Raven & Harvey, 2018
- Bungulla iota Rix, Raven & Harvey, 2018
- Bungulla keigheryi Rix, Raven & Harvey, 2018
- Bungulla keirani Rix, Raven & Harvey, 2018
- Bungulla kendricki Rix, Raven & Harvey, 2018
- Bungulla laevigata Rix, Raven & Harvey, 2018
- Bungulla mckenziei Rix, Raven & Harvey, 2018
- Bungulla oraria Rix, Raven & Harvey, 2018
- Bungulla parva Rix, Raven & Harvey, 2018
- Bungulla pipilata Rix, Harvey & Wilson, 2025
- Bungulla quobba Rix, Raven & Harvey, 2018
- Bungulla riparia (Main, 1957)
- Bungulla sampeyae Rix, Raven & Harvey, 2018
- Bungulla weld Rix, Raven & Harvey, 2018
- Bungulla westi Rix, Raven & Harvey, 2018
- Bungulla yeni Rix, Raven & Harvey, 2018
