= Bungulla gibba =

Scientific classification
- Kingdom: Animalia
- Phylum: Arthropoda
- Subphylum: Chelicerata
- Class: Arachnida
- Order: Araneae
- Infraorder: Mygalomorphae
- Family: Idiopidae
- Genus: Bungulla
- Species: B. gibba

Binomial name
- Bungulla gibba Rix, Raven & Harvey, 2018

Species of spider

Bungulla gibba is a species of mygalomorph spider in the Idiopidae family. It is endemic to Australia. It was described in 2018 by Australian arachnologists Michael Rix, Robert Raven and Mark Harvey. The specific epithet gibba comes from the Latin for “humped“ or “protuberant“, with reference to the morphology of the fovea.

== Distribution and habitat ==
The species occurs in south-west Western Australia in the Esperance Plains and Jarrah Forest bioregions. The type locality is Two Peoples Bay Nature Reserve.
