= Bancroftiana =

Bancroftiana may refer to:

- Bancroftiana, a newsletter of the Bancroft Library of the University of California, Berkeley
- Bancroftiana, a synonym for Euoplos, a spider genus found in Australia
