= Bungulla yeni =

Scientific classification
- Kingdom: Animalia
- Phylum: Arthropoda
- Subphylum: Chelicerata
- Class: Arachnida
- Order: Araneae
- Infraorder: Mygalomorphae
- Family: Idiopidae
- Genus: Bungulla
- Species: B. yeni

Binomial name
- Bungulla yeni Rix, Raven & Harvey, 2018

Species of spider

Bungulla yeni is a species of mygalomorph spider in the Idiopidae family. It is endemic to Australia. It was described in 2018 by Australian arachnologists Michael Rix, Robert Raven and Mark Harvey. The specific epithet yeni honours AlanYen (1950–2017) for his contributions to systematics and invertebrate conservation in Australia.

== Distribution and habitat ==
The species occurs in Western Australia in the central Murchison bioregion. The type locality is Albion Downs Station, 84 km north-north-west of Leinster.
