= Euoplos crenatus =

Scientific classification
- Kingdom: Animalia
- Phylum: Arthropoda
- Subphylum: Chelicerata
- Class: Arachnida
- Order: Araneae
- Infraorder: Mygalomorphae
- Family: Idiopidae
- Genus: Euoplos
- Species: E. crenatus

Binomial name
- Euoplos crenatus Wilson, Rix & Raven, 2019

Species of spider

Euoplos crenatus is a species of mygalomorph spider in the Idiopidae family. It is endemic to Australia. It was described in 2019 by Australian arachnologists Jeremy Wilson, Michael Rix and Robert Raven.

== Distribution and habitat ==
The species occurs in south-east Queensland in the Gympie Region. The type locality is Gympie National Park.
