= Bungulla biota =

Scientific classification
- Kingdom: Animalia
- Phylum: Arthropoda
- Subphylum: Chelicerata
- Class: Arachnida
- Order: Araneae
- Infraorder: Mygalomorphae
- Family: Idiopidae
- Genus: Bungulla
- Species: B. biota

Binomial name
- Bungulla biota Rix, Raven & Harvey, 2018

Species of spider

Bungulla biota is a species of mygalomorph spider in the Idiopidae family. It is endemic to Australia. It was described in 2018 by Australian arachnologists Michael Rix, Robert Raven and Mark Harvey. The specific epithet biota honours the Biota Environmental Sciences consultancy for their support of the Australian Research Council and for providing sequenceable specimens.

== Distribution and habitat ==
The species occurs in the central Murchison bioregion of Western Australia. The type locality is Mount Richardson, 222 km south-east of Mount Magnet.
