= Bungulla hillyerae =

Scientific classification
- Kingdom: Animalia
- Phylum: Arthropoda
- Subphylum: Chelicerata
- Class: Arachnida
- Order: Araneae
- Infraorder: Mygalomorphae
- Family: Idiopidae
- Genus: Bungulla
- Species: B. hillyerae

Binomial name
- Bungulla hillyerae Rix, Raven & Harvey, 2018

Species of spider

Bungulla hillyerae is a species of mygalomorph spider in the Idiopidae family. It is endemic to Australia. It was described in 2018 by Australian arachnologists Michael Rix, Robert Raven and Mark Harvey. The specific epithet hillyerae honours Mia Hillyer for her contributions to molecular systematics, and for finding the holotype specimen.

== Distribution and habitat ==
The species occurs in south-east Western Australia in the Hampton bioregion. The type locality is the Madura Caravan Park, on the Roe Plains, some 1,250 km east of Perth. It has also been recorded from Eucla, close to the state border with South Australia.
