= Blakistonia emmottorum =

Scientific classification
- Kingdom: Animalia
- Phylum: Arthropoda
- Subphylum: Chelicerata
- Class: Arachnida
- Order: Araneae
- Infraorder: Mygalomorphae
- Family: Idiopidae
- Genus: Blakistonia
- Species: B. emmottorum

Binomial name
- Blakistonia emmottorum Harrison, Rix, Harvey & Austin, 2018

Species of spider

Blakistonia emmottorum is a species of mygalomorph spider in the Idiopidae family. It is endemic to Australia. It was described in 2018 by Australian arachnologists Sophie Harrison, Michael Rix, Mark Harvey and Andrew Austin. The specific epithet emmottorum honours Angus and Karen Emmott, owners of Noonbah Station, who collected the holotype specimen.

== Distribution and habitat ==
The species occurs in Central West Queensland. The type locality is Noonbah Station, north of Jundah.
