= Bungulla ajana =

Scientific classification
- Kingdom: Animalia
- Phylum: Arthropoda
- Subphylum: Chelicerata
- Class: Arachnida
- Order: Araneae
- Infraorder: Mygalomorphae
- Family: Idiopidae
- Genus: Bungulla
- Species: B. ajana

Binomial name
- Bungulla ajana Rix, Raven & Harvey, 2018

Species of spider

Bungulla ajana is a species of mygalomorph spider in the Idiopidae family. It is endemic to Australia. It was described in 2018 by Australian arachnologists Michael Rix, Robert Raven and Mark Harvey. The specific epithet ajana refers to the type locality.

== Distribution and habitat ==
The species occurs in the Geraldton Sandplains bioregion of Western Australia. The type locality is Ogilvie Road, west, about 40 km south-west of Ajana, near Kalbarri National Park.
