= Blakistonia maryae =

Scientific classification
- Kingdom: Animalia
- Phylum: Arthropoda
- Subphylum: Chelicerata
- Class: Arachnida
- Order: Araneae
- Infraorder: Mygalomorphae
- Family: Idiopidae
- Genus: Blakistonia
- Species: B. maryae

Binomial name
- Blakistonia maryae Harrison, Rix, Harvey & Austin, 2018

Species of spider

Blakistonia maryae is a species of mygalomorph spider in the Idiopidae family. It is endemic to Australia. It was described in 2018 by Australian arachnologists Sophie Harrison, Michael Rix, Mark Harvey and Andrew Austin. The specific epithet maryae honours Mary Harrison, the senior author's mother, for assistance on collecting trips.

== Distribution and habitat ==
The species occurs in South Australia. The type locality is the South Middleback Ranges in the eastern Eyre Peninsula.
