= Euoplos jayneae =

Scientific classification
- Kingdom: Animalia
- Phylum: Arthropoda
- Subphylum: Chelicerata
- Class: Arachnida
- Order: Araneae
- Infraorder: Mygalomorphae
- Family: Idiopidae
- Genus: Euoplos
- Species: E. jayneae

Binomial name
- Euoplos jayneae Wilson & Rix, 2021

Species of spider

Euoplos jayneae is a species of mygalomorph spider in the Idiopidae family. It is endemic to Australia. It was described in 2021 by Australian arachnologists Jeremy Wilson and Michael Rix.

== Distribution and habitat ==
The species occurs in south-east Queensland in the Sunshine Coast hinterland. The type locality is Kowald Road in Landsborough, just north of the Glass House Mountains and some 80 km north of Brisbane.
