= Bungulla aplini =

Scientific classification
- Kingdom: Animalia
- Phylum: Arthropoda
- Subphylum: Chelicerata
- Class: Arachnida
- Order: Araneae
- Infraorder: Mygalomorphae
- Family: Idiopidae
- Genus: Bungulla
- Species: B. aplini

Binomial name
- Bungulla aplini Rix, Raven & Harvey, 2018

Species of spider

Bungulla aplini is a species of mygalomorph spider in the Idiopidae family. It is endemic to Australia. It was described in 2018 by Australian arachnologists Michael Rix, Robert Raven and Mark Harvey. The specific epithet aplini honours Ken Aplin, for his contributions to the Southern Carnarvon Basin Survey and the study of Australasian biodiversity.

== Distribution and habitat ==
The species occurs in the north-western Yalgoo bioregion of Western Australia. The type locality is Nerren Nerren Station, near Shark Bay.
