= Bungulla oraria =

Scientific classification
- Kingdom: Animalia
- Phylum: Arthropoda
- Subphylum: Chelicerata
- Class: Arachnida
- Order: Araneae
- Infraorder: Mygalomorphae
- Family: Idiopidae
- Genus: Bungulla
- Species: B. oraria

Binomial name
- Bungulla oraria Rix, Raven & Harvey, 2018

Species of spider

Bungulla oraria is a species of mygalomorph spider in the Idiopidae family. It is endemic to Australia. It was described in 2018 by Australian arachnologists Michael Rix, Robert Raven and Mark Harvey. The specific epithet oraria comes from the Latin for “coastal”, with reference to the type locality.

== Distribution and habitat ==
The species occurs in south-west Western Australia in the southern Jarrah Forest bioregion. The type locality is Torndirrup National Park, on the Torndirrup Peninsula, some 10 km south of Albany.
