= Hibbertia cockertoniana =

Conservation status
- Priority Three — Poorly Known Taxa (DEC)

Scientific classification
- Kingdom: Plantae
- Clade: Tracheophytes
- Clade: Angiosperms
- Clade: Eudicots
- Order: Dilleniales
- Family: Dilleniaceae
- Genus: Hibbertia
- Species: H. cockertoniana

Binomial name
- Hibbertia cockertoniana K.R.Thiele

Species of flowering plant

Hibbertia cockertoniana is a species of flowering plant in the family Dilleniaceae and is endemic to the south-west of Western Australia. It is an erect shrub with scattered linear leaves and yellow flowers arranged singly in leaf axils usually with ten stamens all on one side of the two carpels.

== Description ==
Hibbertia cockertoniana is an erect shrub that typically grows to a height of 0.4–1.0 m (1 ft 4 in – 3 ft 3 in), its young branchlets reddish with a few star-shaped hairs. The leaves are linear and scattered, mostly 12–18 mm (0.47–0.71 in) long and 0.8–1.2 mm (0.031–0.047 in) wide with the edges rolled under. The flowers are arranged singly in leaf axils on pedicels 7–22 mm (0.28–0.87 in) long with linear bracts 2.5–4.2 mm (0.098–0.165 in) long. The five sepals are broadly egg-shaped to almost round, 5.2–6.5 mm (0.20–0.26 in) long. The five petals are yellow, 8–14 mm (0.31–0.55 in) long and egg-shaped with the narrower end towards the base. The ten stamens are all on one side of the two carpels, and fourteen to twenty-eight staminodes are in bundles near the stamens. The carpels are densely hairy and there are two ovules per carpel. Flowering has been recorded from July to September.

== Taxonomy ==
Hibbertia cockertoniana was first formally described in 2015 by Kevin Thiele in the journal Nuytsia from specimens collected on the Mount Gibson Range by Geoff Cockerton in 2015. The specific epithet (cockertoniana) honours the collector of the type specimens.

== Distribution and habitat ==
This species is only known from three disjunct areas in the Geraldton Sandplains and Yalgoo biogeographic regions in the south-west of Western Australia, where it grows in shrubland on ironstone, granite outcrops and sand.

== Conservation status ==
Hibbertia cockertoniana is classified as "Priority Three" by the Government of Western Australia Department of Parks and Wildlife meaning that it is poorly known and known from only a few locations but is not under imminent threat.

== See also ==
- List of Hibbertia species
