= Blakistonia olea =

Scientific classification
- Kingdom: Animalia
- Phylum: Arthropoda
- Subphylum: Chelicerata
- Class: Arachnida
- Order: Araneae
- Infraorder: Mygalomorphae
- Family: Idiopidae
- Genus: Blakistonia
- Species: B. olea

Binomial name
- Blakistonia olea Harrison, Rix, Harvey & Austin, 2018

Species of spider

Blakistonia olea is a species of mygalomorph spider in the Idiopidae family. It is endemic to Australia. It was described in 2018 by Australian arachnologists Sophie Harrison, Michael Rix, Mark Harvey and Andrew Austin. The specific epithet olea comes from the Latin for "olive’’, referring to the olive-green colour of the spiders.

== Distribution and habitat ==
The species occurs in southern Western Australia. The type locality is Peak Charles National Park in the Eastern Mallee bioregion, with the holotype found in Allocasuarina woodland.
