= Bungulla dipsodes =

Scientific classification
- Kingdom: Animalia
- Phylum: Arthropoda
- Subphylum: Chelicerata
- Class: Arachnida
- Order: Araneae
- Infraorder: Mygalomorphae
- Family: Idiopidae
- Genus: Bungulla
- Species: B. dipsodes

Binomial name
- Bungulla dipsodes Rix, Raven & Harvey, 2018

Species of spider

Bungulla dipsodes is a species of mygalomorph spider in the Idiopidae family. It is endemic to Australia. It was described in 2018 by Australian arachnologists Michael Rix, Robert Raven and Mark Harvey. The specific epithet dipsodes comes from the Greek for "thirsty", with reference to the arid landscape of the spiders’ range.

== Distribution and habitat ==
The species occurs in the Murchison region of Western Australia, north of the Robinson Ranges in the southern Gascoyne bioregion. The type locality is Meekatharra.
