= Blakistonia bella =

Scientific classification
- Kingdom: Animalia
- Phylum: Arthropoda
- Subphylum: Chelicerata
- Class: Arachnida
- Order: Araneae
- Infraorder: Mygalomorphae
- Family: Idiopidae
- Genus: Blakistonia
- Species: B. bella

Binomial name
- Blakistonia bella Harrison, Rix, Harvey & Austin, 2018

Species of spider

Blakistonia bella is a species of mygalomorph spider in the Idiopidae family. It is endemic to Australia. It was described in 2018 by Australian arachnologists Sophie Harrison, Michael Rix, Mark Harvey and Andrew Austin. The specific epithet bella is from the Latin for "beautiful", with reference to the distinctively patterned abdomen.

== Distribution and habitat ==
The species occurs in northern South Australia. The type locality is Johnson's Bore, south-west of Lake Eyre. It has also been recorded from Strangways Springs on Stuart Creek Station.
