= Acacia cerastes =

Conservation status
- Priority Three — Poorly Known Taxa (DEC)

Scientific classification
- Kingdom: Plantae
- Clade: Tracheophytes
- Clade: Angiosperms
- Clade: Eudicots
- Clade: Rosids
- Order: Fabales
- Family: Fabaceae
- Subfamily: Caesalpinioideae
- Clade: Mimosoid clade
- Genus: Acacia
- Species: A. cerastes

Binomial name
- Acacia cerastes Maslin
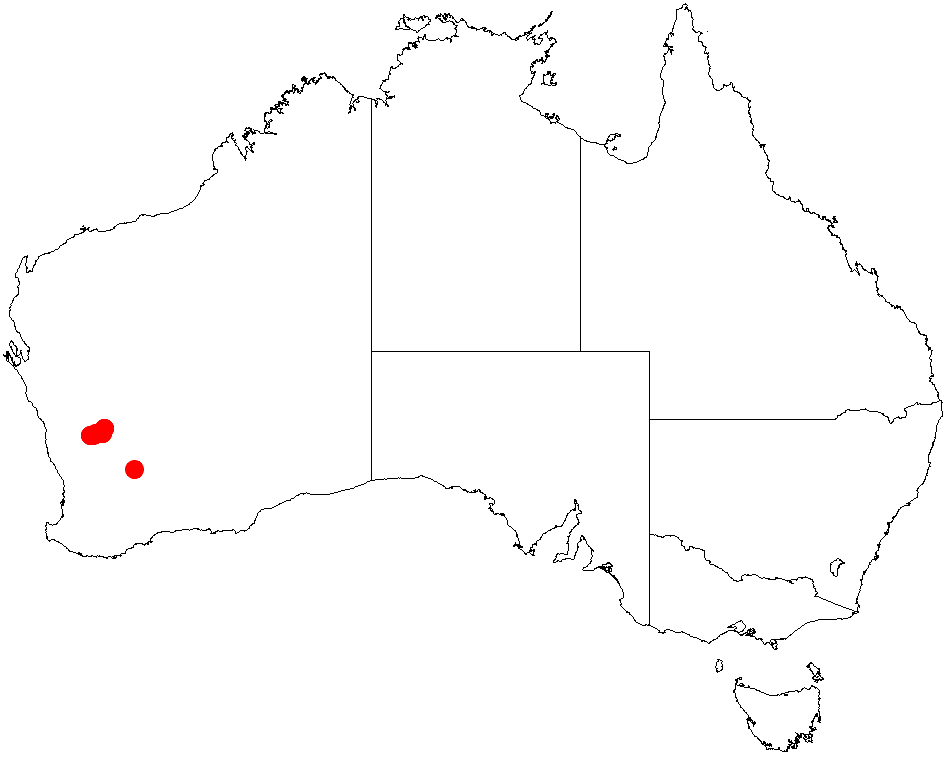
- Occurrence data from AVH

Synonyms
- Racosperma cerastes (Maslin) Pedley

Species of legume

Acacia cerastes is a species of flowering plant in the family Fabaceae and is endemic to the south-west of Western Australia. It is an erect, intricately-branched, glabrous shrub with winding, striated branchlets, its phyllodes reduced to tiny horn-like projections, spherical heads of golden yellow flowers, and linear, thinly leathery pods.

== Description ==
Acacia cerastes is an erect, intricately-branched shrub that typically grows up to a height of 1.5 m (4 ft 11 in). Its branchlets are winding, striated, green or brown and terete. The phyllodes are reduced to tiny, horn-like projections up to 1 mm (0.039 in) long and usually curved downwards and rigid, but not sharply pointed. The flowers are borne a spherical head in axils on a peduncle 1–4 mm (0.039–0.157 in) long, each head with about thirty golden yellow flowers. Flowering has been recorded in July, August and November, and the pods are linear, thinly leathery, more or less constricted between the seeds and obviously rounded over them, up to 45 mm (1.8 in) long and 3–4 mm (0.12–0.16 in) wide.

== Taxonomy ==
Acacia cerastes was first formally described in 1995 by the botanist Bruce Maslin in the journal Nuytsia from specimens collected on Mount Gibson station by Charles Austin Gardner, between Wubin and Paynes Find in 1976. The specific epithet means 'a horned serpent', referring to the snake-like branchlets with "extremely reduced phyllodes".

== Distribution and habitat ==
This species of wattle is only known from Mount Gibson and Ninghan Station stations in the Avon Wheatbelt and Yalgoo bioregions of south-western Western Australia, where it grows on rocky hills.

== Conservation status ==
Acacia cerastes is listed as "Priority Three" by the Government of Western Australia Department of Biodiversity, Conservation and Attractions meaning that it is poorly known and known from only a few locations but is not under imminent threat.

== See also ==
- List of Acacia species
