= Bungulla mckenziei =

Scientific classification
- Kingdom: Animalia
- Phylum: Arthropoda
- Subphylum: Chelicerata
- Class: Arachnida
- Order: Araneae
- Infraorder: Mygalomorphae
- Family: Idiopidae
- Genus: Bungulla
- Species: B. mckenziei

Binomial name
- Bungulla mckenziei Rix, Raven & Harvey, 2018

Species of spider

Bungulla mckenziei is a species of mygalomorph spider in the Idiopidae family. It is endemic to Australia. It was described in 2018 by Australian arachnologists Michael Rix, Robert Raven and Mark Harvey. The specific epithet mckenziei honours Norm McKenzie for his contributions to the Southern Carnarvon Basin Survey and to the study of Australian biodiversity.

== Distribution and habitat ==
The species occurs in Western Australia in the southern Carnarvon, Yalgoo and northern Geraldton Sandplains bioregions, its range extending from the Peron Peninsula southwards to Zuytdorp. The type locality is Zuytdorp.
