= Euoplos goomboorian =

Scientific classification
- Kingdom: Animalia
- Phylum: Arthropoda
- Subphylum: Chelicerata
- Class: Arachnida
- Order: Araneae
- Infraorder: Mygalomorphae
- Family: Idiopidae
- Genus: Euoplos
- Species: E. goomboorian

Binomial name
- Euoplos goomboorian Wilson, Rix & Raven, 2019

Species of spider

Euoplos goomboorian is a species of mygalomorph spider in the Idiopidae family. It is endemic to Australia. It was described in 2019 by Australian arachnologists Jeremy Wilson, Michael Rix and Robert Raven. The specific epithet refers to the type locality.

== Distribution and habitat ==
The species occurs in south-east Queensland in the Gympie Region. The type locality is Goomboorian National Park.
