= Euoplos schmidti =

Scientific classification
- Kingdom: Animalia
- Phylum: Arthropoda
- Subphylum: Chelicerata
- Class: Arachnida
- Order: Araneae
- Infraorder: Mygalomorphae
- Family: Idiopidae
- Genus: Euoplos
- Species: E. schmidti

Binomial name
- Euoplos schmidti Wilson & Rix, 2021

Species of spider

Euoplos schmidti is a species of mygalomorph spider in the Idiopidae family. It is endemic to Australia. It was described in 2021 by Australian arachnologists Jeremy Wilson and Michael Rix.

== Distribution and habitat ==
The species occurs in south-east Queensland in the greater Brisbane area, south of the Brisbane River. The type locality is a riparian embankment in wet sclerophyll forest in Whites Hill Reserve.
