= Bungulla burbidgei =

Scientific classification
- Kingdom: Animalia
- Phylum: Arthropoda
- Subphylum: Chelicerata
- Class: Arachnida
- Order: Araneae
- Infraorder: Mygalomorphae
- Family: Idiopidae
- Genus: Bungulla
- Species: B. burbidgei

Binomial name
- Bungulla burbidgei Rix, Raven & Harvey, 2018

Species of spider

Bungulla burbidgei is a species of mygalomorph spider in the Idiopidae family. It is endemic to Australia. It was described in 2018 by Australian arachnologists Michael Rix, Robert Raven and Mark Harvey. The specific epithet burbidgei honours Allan Burbidge for his contributions to the Southern Carnarvon Basin Survey and to the study of Australian biodiversity.

== Distribution and habitat ==
The species occurs in the Mid West region of Western Australia, in the Geraldton Sandplains bioregion. The type locality is Zuytdorp, between Shark Bay and Kalbarri National Park.
