= Xanthoparmelia cranfieldii =

Scientific classification
- Kingdom: Fungi
- Division: Ascomycota
- Class: Lecanoromycetes
- Order: Lecanorales
- Family: Parmeliaceae
- Genus: Xanthoparmelia
- Species: X. cranfieldii

Binomial name
- Xanthoparmelia cranfieldii Elix (2003)

Species of foliose lichen

Xanthoparmelia cranfieldii is a species of foliose lichen in the family Parmeliaceae, first described by John Elix in 2003. It is known only from its type locality in Western Australia.

== Taxonomy ==
Xanthoparmelia cranfieldii is a member of the genus Xanthoparmelia, which is characterised by its foliose, or leaf-like, thalli that adhere closely to the substrates on which they grow. This species is named in honour of Ray Cranfield, an Australian botanist who collected the type specimen.

== Description ==
The thallus of Xanthoparmelia cranfieldii is closely appressed to the substrate, typically measuring 2–3 cm in width. The lobes of the thallus are flat, ranging from 0.6 to 1.2 mm wide, with subirregular to sublinear shapes that may branch more or less dichotomously. The upper surface of the thallus is yellow-green, becoming darker with age, and features a shiny texture near the lobe tips. The surface becomes rugose, cracked, and areolate as it ages, adorned with white spots. Notably, the lichen develops distinctive isidia—small outgrowths that can disperse the lichen's algae—which are roughly cylindrical to somewhat cylindrical and can become sorediate, meaning they crumble into powdery granules for reproduction.

The lower surface is ivory to pale brown, with rhizines (root-like structures) that are sparse to moderately dense and brown in colour. The lichen does not produce apothecia (fruiting bodies) or pycnidia (structures containing asexual spores).

== Chemistry ==
Xanthoparmelia cranfieldii contains several unique secondary metabolites. The cortex reacts with a pale yellow colour when exposed to potassium hydroxide solution (K+), while the medulla shows no reaction to the same test. Its chemical profile includes usnic acid as a major component and atranorin, elatinic acid, myelochroic acid, and isomyelochroic acid as minor components. This combination of chemicals is unique within Xanthoparmelia.

== Habitat and distribution ==
At the time of its original publication, Xanthoparmelia cranfieldii was known only from the area where it was first found: 20.5 km (12.7 mi) south-southwest of Mount Gibson in Western Australia, situated at an elevation of approximately 800 m (2,600 ft). The lichen was found on an old tea cup found in open shrubland

== See also ==
- List of Xanthoparmelia species
