= Euoplos saplan =

Scientific classification
- Kingdom: Animalia
- Phylum: Arthropoda
- Subphylum: Chelicerata
- Class: Arachnida
- Order: Araneae
- Infraorder: Mygalomorphae
- Family: Idiopidae
- Genus: Euoplos
- Species: E. saplan

Binomial name
- Euoplos saplan Rix, Wilson & Harvey, 2019

Species of spider

Euoplos saplan is a species of mygalomorph spider in the Idiopidae family. It is endemic to Australia. It was described in 2019 by Australian arachnologists Michael Rix, Jeremy Wilson and Mark Harvey. The specific epithet saplan is an acronym for the “Salinity Action Plan” environmental survey of the Wheatbelt, by the Western Australian Museum and the Department of Conservation and Land Management, which resulted in the collection of many specimens, including this species.

== Distribution and habitat ==
The species occurs in south-west Western Australia in the northern Avon Wheatbelt bioregion. The type locality is Buntine Rocks Nature Reserve.
