= Bungulla disrupta =

Scientific classification
- Kingdom: Animalia
- Phylum: Arthropoda
- Subphylum: Chelicerata
- Class: Arachnida
- Order: Araneae
- Infraorder: Mygalomorphae
- Family: Idiopidae
- Genus: Bungulla
- Species: B. disrupta

Binomial name
- Bungulla disrupta Rix, Raven & Harvey, 2018

Species of spider

Bungulla disrupta is a species of mygalomorph spider in the Idiopidae family. It is endemic to Australia. It was described in 2018 by Australian arachnologists Michael Rix, Robert Raven and Mark Harvey. The specific epithet disrupta comes from the Latin for "broken up" or "separated", with reference to its highly fragmented distribution in the aftermath of land clearing.

== Distribution and habitat ==
The species occurs in south-west Western Australia in the Avon Wheatbelt, eastern Jarrah Forest and western Mallee bioregions. The type locality is Lake Magenta Nature Reserve, 55 km north-east of Jerramungup.
