= Bungulla bringo =

Scientific classification
- Kingdom: Animalia
- Phylum: Arthropoda
- Subphylum: Chelicerata
- Class: Arachnida
- Order: Araneae
- Infraorder: Mygalomorphae
- Family: Idiopidae
- Genus: Bungulla
- Species: B. bringo

Binomial name
- Bungulla bringo Rix, Raven & Harvey, 2018

Species of spider

Bungulla bringo is a species of mygalomorph spider in the Idiopidae family. It is endemic to Australia. It was described in 2018 by Australian arachnologists Michael Rix, Robert Raven and Mark Harvey. The specific epithet bringo refers to the type locality.

== Distribution and habitat ==
The species occurs in the Mid West region of Western Australia, in the Geraldton Sandplains and Avon Wheatbelt bioregions. The type locality is a gully with York Gum woodland, 1 km south-east of Bringo railway cutting, 20 km east of Geraldton.
