= Euoplos eungellaensis =

Scientific classification
- Kingdom: Animalia
- Phylum: Arthropoda
- Subphylum: Chelicerata
- Class: Arachnida
- Order: Araneae
- Infraorder: Mygalomorphae
- Family: Idiopidae
- Genus: Euoplos
- Species: E. eungellaensis

Binomial name
- Euoplos eungellaensis Wilson, Harvey & Rix, 2022

Species of spider

Euoplos eungellaensis is a species of mygalomorph spider in the Idiopidae family. It is endemic to Australia. It was described in 2022 by Australian arachnologists Jeremy Wilson, Mark Harvey and Michael Rix. The specific epithet eungellaensis refers to the type locality.

== Distribution and habitat ==
The species occurs in North Queensland, in high elevation subtropical rainforest in the Clarke Range, west of Mackay. The type locality is the Eungella National Park.
