= Bungulla riparia =

Scientific classification
- Kingdom: Animalia
- Phylum: Arthropoda
- Subphylum: Chelicerata
- Class: Arachnida
- Order: Araneae
- Infraorder: Mygalomorphae
- Family: Idiopidae
- Genus: Bungulla
- Species: B. riparia

Binomial name
- Bungulla riparia (Main, 1957)

Synonyms
- Eucyrtops riparia Main, 1957

Species of spider

Bungulla riparia is a species of mygalomorph spider in the Idiopidae family. It is endemic to Australia. It was described in 1957 by Australian arachnologist Barbara York Main.

== Distribution and habitat ==
The species occurs in Western Australia in the Geraldton Sandplains bioregion, from Lesueur National Park southwards to Mount Misery, in woodland habitats and on creek banks on friable sedimentary soils. The type locality is a mile south of Mount Misery, west of Moora in the Wheatbelt.

== Behaviour ==
The spiders are fossorial, terrestrial predators which construct burrows with stiff, flaplike trapdoors.
