= Euoplos mcmillani =

Scientific classification
- Kingdom: Animalia
- Phylum: Arthropoda
- Subphylum: Chelicerata
- Class: Arachnida
- Order: Araneae
- Infraorder: Mygalomorphae
- Family: Idiopidae
- Genus: Euoplos
- Species: E. mcmillani

Binomial name
- Euoplos mcmillani (Main, 2000)

Synonyms
- Arbanitis mcmillani Main, 2000

Species of spider

Euoplos mcmillani is a species of mygalomorph spider in the Idiopidae family. It is endemic to Australia. It was described in 2000 by Australian arachnologist Barbara York Main.

== Distribution and habitat ==
The species occurs in south-west Western Australia in the Geraldton Sandplains and Swan Coastal Plain bioregions in kwongan heathland habitats. The type locality is a sand mine rehabilitation site at Eneabba, 278 km north of Perth.
