= Euoplos festivus =

Scientific classification
- Domain: Eukaryota
- Kingdom: Animalia
- Phylum: Arthropoda
- Subphylum: Chelicerata
- Class: Arachnida
- Order: Araneae
- Infraorder: Mygalomorphae
- Family: Idiopidae
- Genus: Euoplos
- Species: E. festivus

Binomial name
- Euoplos festivus (Rainbow & Pulleine, 1918)

Synonyms
- Arbanitis festivus Rainbow & Pulleine, 1918

Species of spider

Euoplos festivus is a species of armoured trapdoor spider in the family Idiopidae. It is found in Western Australia.
