= Euoplos bairnsdale =

Scientific classification
- Kingdom: Animalia
- Phylum: Arthropoda
- Subphylum: Chelicerata
- Class: Arachnida
- Order: Araneae
- Infraorder: Mygalomorphae
- Family: Idiopidae
- Genus: Euoplos
- Species: E. bairnsdale

Binomial name
- Euoplos bairnsdale (Main, 1995)

Synonyms
- Arbanitis bairnsdale Main, 1995

Species of spider

Euoplos bairnsdale is a species of mygalomorph spider in the Idiopidae family. It is endemic to Australia. It was described in 1995 by Australian arachnologist Barbara York Main. The specific epithet refers to the type locality.

== Distribution and habitat ==
The species occurs in Victoria. The type locality is Bairnsdale.
