= Euoplos variabilis =

Scientific classification
- Kingdom: Animalia
- Phylum: Arthropoda
- Subphylum: Chelicerata
- Class: Arachnida
- Order: Araneae
- Infraorder: Mygalomorphae
- Family: Idiopidae
- Genus: Euoplos
- Species: E. variabilis

Binomial name
- Euoplos variabilis (Rainbow & Pulleine, 1918)

Synonyms
- Tambouriniana variabilis Rainbow & Pulleine, 1918; Tambouriniana variabilis flavomaculata Rainbow & Pulleine, 1918; Albaniana villosa Rainbow & Pulleine, 1918

Species of spider

Euoplos variabilis, also known as the Mount Tamborine trapdoor spider, is a species of mygalomorph spider in the Idiopidae family. It is endemic to Australia. It was described in 1918 by Australian arachnologists William Joseph Rainbow and Robert Henry Pulleine.

== Distribution and habitat ==
The species occurs in the mountainous Scenic Rim region of south-eastern Queensland and northern New South Wales, in tall open forest and closed forest habitats. The type locality is Tamborine Mountain.

== Behaviour ==
The spiders are fossorial, terrestrial predators. They construct burrows with thick, plug-like trapdoors in bare soil patches on the forest floor, especially on banks and slopes.
