= Euoplos spinnipes =

Scientific classification
- Domain: Eukaryota
- Kingdom: Animalia
- Phylum: Arthropoda
- Subphylum: Chelicerata
- Class: Arachnida
- Order: Araneae
- Infraorder: Mygalomorphae
- Family: Idiopidae
- Genus: Euoplos
- Species: E. spinnipes

Binomial name
- Euoplos spinnipes (Rainbow, 1914)

Species of spider

Euoplos spinnipes is a species of armoured trapdoor spider in the family Idiopidae. It is found in Queensland, Australia.
