= Euoplos dignitas =

Scientific classification
- Kingdom: Animalia
- Phylum: Arthropoda
- Subphylum: Chelicerata
- Class: Arachnida
- Order: Araneae
- Infraorder: Mygalomorphae
- Family: Idiopidae
- Genus: Euoplos
- Species: E. dignitas

Binomial name
- Euoplos dignitas (Wilson, Rix & Oliver, 2023)

Species of spider found in Queensland, Australia

Euoplos dignitas is a species of armoured golden trapdoor spider in the family Idiopidae. It is found in Queensland, Australia.

== Taxonomy and naming ==
Specimens of Euoplos dignitas were first scientifically described in 2023, though other specimens have been noted as far back as the 1960s, and the species was first discovered in the early 20th century. It was not named and scientifically described until 2023 due to no research being done in it. The first male specimen was collected in 2021, which allowed researchers to determine that it was a new species.

Its name is derived from the Latin word for "dignity" or "greatness", as well as paying homage to Project DIG (one of the sponsors of the research that found and catalogued the species).

== Description and behaviour ==
The adult female can grow up to 5 centimetres (2.0 in) in body length and has a red-brown armoured carapace. It spends most of its life underground in its burrow. The adult male can grow up to 3 centimetres (1.2 in) in body length and has a honey-red outer layer and a grey-brown abdomen. The male tends to live in its burrow for 5-7 years before sexually maturing and venturing out in search of a mate.

Though males do not live long after reaching sexual maturity, females may live more than 20 years in the wild.

== Distribution and habitat ==
E. dignitas can be found in the open woodland areas around Eidsvold and Monto in the Brigalow Belt region of Central Queensland in Australia. It creates trapdoor burrows in the rich black soil there. It is likely to be named an endangered species due to loss of habitat, but further study is needed to determine where on the endangered scale it will be placed. Much of its habitat has been cleared and divided for agricultural use.

== Bites to humans ==
There are no known incidents of bites to humans. As with other trapdoor spiders, the bite is likely painful, but the venom is not dangerous to humans.
