= Euoplos hoggi =

Scientific classification
- Kingdom: Animalia
- Phylum: Arthropoda
- Subphylum: Chelicerata
- Class: Arachnida
- Order: Araneae
- Infraorder: Mygalomorphae
- Family: Idiopidae
- Genus: Euoplos
- Species: E. hoggi

Binomial name
- Euoplos hoggi (Simon, 1908)

Synonyms
- Cantuaria hoggi Simon, 1908

Species of spider

Euoplos hoggi is a species of mygalomorph spider in the Idiopidae family. It is endemic to Australia. It was described in 1908 by French arachnologist Eugène Simon.

== Distribution and habitat ==
The species occurs in Western Australia in woodland habitats. The type locality is Eradu, 34 km east of Geraldton, in the Mid West region.

== Behaviour ==
The spiders are fossorial, terrestrial predators. They construct burrows, with thick, plug-like doors, in creek banks and the flood flats of salt lakes.
