= Euoplos ornatus =

Scientific classification
- Kingdom: Animalia
- Phylum: Arthropoda
- Subphylum: Chelicerata
- Class: Arachnida
- Order: Araneae
- Infraorder: Mygalomorphae
- Family: Idiopidae
- Genus: Euoplos
- Species: E. ornatus

Binomial name
- Euoplos ornatus (Rainbow & Pulleine, 1918)

Synonyms
- Albaniana ornata Rainbow & Pulleine, 1918; Bancroftiana speciosa Rainbow & Pulleine, 1918; Armadalia ornata Rainbow & Pulleine, 1918

Species of spider

Euoplos ornatus is a species of mygalomorph spider in the Idiopidae family. It is endemic to Australia. It was described in 1918 by Australian arachnologists William Joseph Rainbow and Robert Henry Pulleine.

== Distribution and habitat ==
The species occurs in eastern Queensland in open brigalow woodland and dry vine forest habitats with gilgais. The type locality is Eidsvold, in the North Burnett Region, some 430 km north of Brisbane.

== Behaviour ==
The spiders are fossorial, terrestrial predators. They construct burrows with trapdoors.
