= Acacia assimilis =

- In Wongan Hills

Scientific classification
- Kingdom: Plantae
- Clade: Tracheophytes
- Clade: Angiosperms
- Clade: Eudicots
- Clade: Rosids
- Order: Fabales
- Family: Fabaceae
- Subfamily: Caesalpinioideae
- Clade: Mimosoid clade
- Genus: Acacia
- Species: A. assimilis

Binomial name
- Acacia assimilis S.Moore
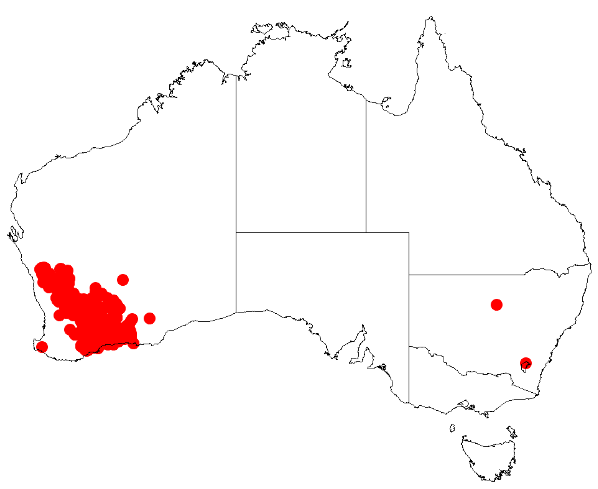
- Acacia assimilis occurrence data from Australasian Virtual Herbarium

Synonyms
- Racosperma assimile (S.Moore) Pedley

Species of legume

Habit in the Wongan Hills Wildflower Walk

Acacia assimilis is a species of flowering plant in the family Fabaceae and is endemic to the south-west of Western Australia. It is a dense, spreading, rounded shrub or tree with thread-like, glabrous, green phyllodes, spherical to elliptic or oblong heads of golden or lemon-yellow flowers, and linear pods up to 85 mm (3.3 in) long.

== Description ==
Acacia assimilis is dense, rounded, spreading shrub or tree that typically grows to a height of 1–3 m (3 ft 3 in – 9 ft 10 in) and has glabrous branchlets that are round in cross section. New shoots are densely covered with yellow hairs pressed against the surface. Its phyllodes are light or bright green and thread-like, mostly 50–140 mm (2.0–5.5 in) long, 0.8–1.3 mm (0.031–0.051 in) wide and round in cross-section with many fine, closely parallel veins. The flowers are borne in spherical to elliptic or oblong heads 4–6 mm (0.16–0.24 in) diameter, mostly with 30 to 70 golden- or lemon-yellow flowers in each head. Flowering time varies with subspecies and the pods are linear, straight, 30–85 mm (1.2–3.3 in) long and 3–4 mm (0.12–0.16 in) wide containing elliptic to egg-shaped or oblong, dark brown to black seeds 2.5–3.0 mm (0.098–0.118 in) long.

== Taxonomy ==
Acacia assimilis was first formally described in 1920 by Spencer Le Marchant Moore in the Journal of the Linnean Society, Botany from specimens collected near Bruce Rock.

In 1995, Richard Sumner Cowan and Bruce Maslin described A. assimilis subspecies atroviridis, in the journal Nuytsia and that name, and that of the autonym are accepted by the Australian Plant Census:

- Acacia assimilis subsp. assimilis (the autonym) commonly has light green phyllodes, mostly 50–95 mm (2.0–3.7 in) long and heads with 30 to 40 flowers. Flowering occurs from July to October.
- Acacia assimilis subsp. atroviridis has dark green phyllodes, mostly 80–140 mm (3.1–5.5 in) long and heads with 50 to 70 flowers. Flowering occurs throughout the year.

== Distribution and habitat ==
Acacia assimilis is common from Mullewa to Boxwood Hill and east to the Norseman-Scaddan area in the Avon Wheatbelt, Coolgardie, Esperance Plains, Geraldton Sandplains, Mallee, Swan Coastal Plain and Yalgoo bioregions of south-western Western Australia where it is grows on sandplains, in low-lying areas, among granite outcrops and on rocky hills. The southern part of the range is occupied by subsp. atroviridis and the two subspecies overlap in a narrow range, with some collections suggesting that hybridisation is possible.

== Conservation status ==
Both subspecies of Acacia assimilis are listed as 'Not threatened' by the Government of Western Australia Department of Biodiversity, Conservation and Attractions.

== See also ==
- List of Acacia species
