= Acacia resinimarginea =

Scientific classification
- Kingdom: Plantae
- Clade: Tracheophytes
- Clade: Angiosperms
- Clade: Eudicots
- Clade: Rosids
- Order: Fabales
- Family: Fabaceae
- Subfamily: Caesalpinioideae
- Clade: Mimosoid clade
- Genus: Acacia
- Species: A. resinimarginea

Binomial name
- Acacia resinimarginea W.Fitzg.
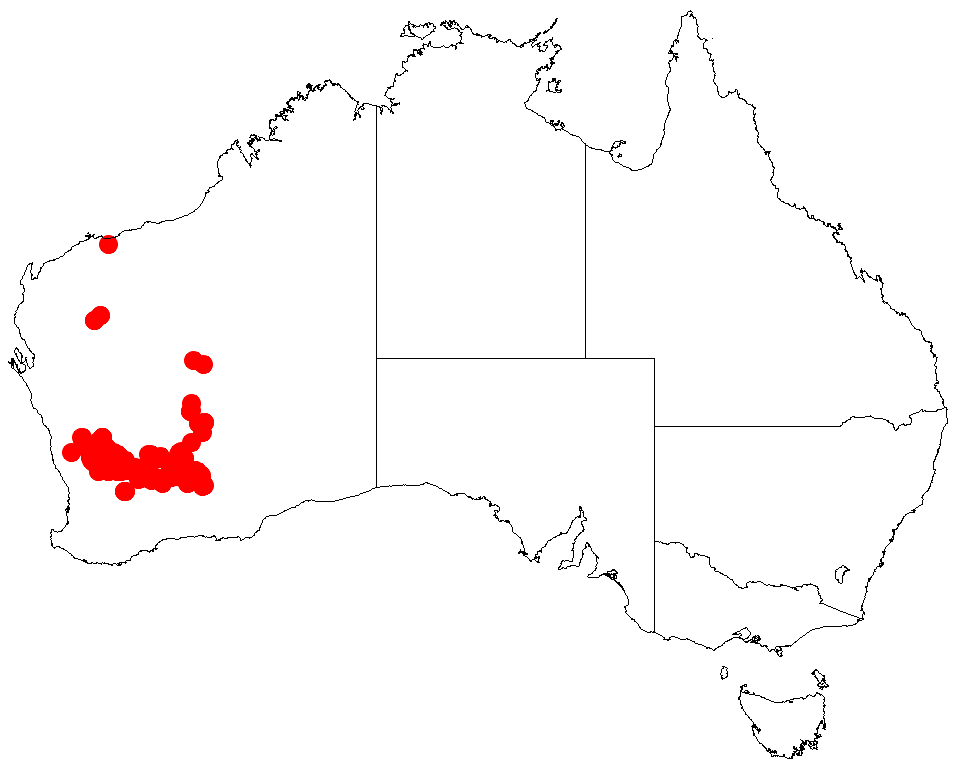
- Occurrence data from AVH

Species of legume

Acacia resinimarginea, also known as old-man wodjil, is a tree or shrub belonging to the genus Acacia and the subgenus Juliflorae that is endemic to western Australia.

== Description ==
The tree or shrub typically grows to a height of 1.5 to 7 metres (5 to 23 ft) with an erect habit and with straight trunks. It has glabrous and terete branchlets and resinous ribs when still immature. Like most species of Acacia, it has phyllodes rather than true leaves. The ascending to erect phyllodes have a linear shape and are quite straight and have a mostly rhombic cross-section with a length of 8 to 18 cm (3.1 to 7.1 in) and a width of 1 to 1.5 mm (0.039 to 0.059 in). The glabrous phyllodes have a slightly recurved tapered point and resinous nerve at the apex of each of the four angles. It blooms from August to October producing yellow flowers. The simple inflorescences are found on stalks that are 2.5 to 6 mm (0.098 to 0.236 in) in length. The obloid to short-cylindrical flower-heads are 6 to 15 mm (0.24 to 0.59 in) in length and packed with golden flowers. The glabrous and chartaceous seed pods that form after flowering have a straight shape and are constricted between and raised over each of the seeds and have a length of up to 6 cm (2.4 in) and a wisth of around 2 mm (0.079 in). The mottled brown seeds inside are arranged longitudinally. The seeds have an elliptic-oblong shape with a length of 2.5 to 3.5 mm (0.098 to 0.138 in) with a crested apical aril.

== Distribution ==
Acacia resinimarginea is native to a large area in the Mid West and Wheatbelt region of Western Australia where it is often situated on undulating plains growing mostly in sandy but sometimes in loamy soils, often as pure stands. It is found from around Perenjori in the west to around Kambalda in the south east and up to around Leonora in the north.

== See also ==
- List of Acacia species
