= Blakistonia =

Scientific classification
- Kingdom: Animalia
- Phylum: Arthropoda
- Subphylum: Chelicerata
- Class: Arachnida
- Order: Araneae
- Infraorder: Mygalomorphae
- Family: Idiopidae
- Genus: Blakistonia; Hogg, 1902

Type species
- B. aurea Hogg, 1902

Species
- 20, see text

Synonyms
- Cantuarides Strand, 1907

Genus of spiders

Blakistonia is a genus of Australian armoured trapdoor spiders that was first described by Henry Roughton Hogg in 1902.

== Species ==
As of May 2019 the genus contained twenty species from the states of New South Wales (NSW), Queensland (QLD), South Australia (SA), Victoria (VIC) or Western Australia (WA):

- B. aurea Hogg, 1902 (type) – NSW, SA, VIC
- B. bassi Harrison, Rix, Harvey & Austin, 2018 – SA
- B. bella Harrison, Rix, Harvey & Austin, 2018 – SA
- B. birksi Harrison, Rix, Harvey & Austin, 2018 – SA, VIC
- B. carnarvon Harrison, Rix, Harvey & Austin, 2018 – QLD
- B. emmottorum Harrison, Rix, Harvey & Austin, 2018 – QLD
- B. gemmelli Harrison, Rix, Harvey & Austin, 2018 – SA
- B. hortoni Harrison, Rix, Harvey & Austin, 2018 – SA
- B. mainae Harrison, Rix, Harvey & Austin, 2018 – WA
- B. maryae Harrison, Rix, Harvey & Austin, 2018 – SA
- B. newtoni Harrison, Rix, Harvey & Austin, 2018 – SA
- B. nullarborensis Harrison, Rix, Harvey & Austin, 2018 – WA
- B. olea Harrison, Rix, Harvey & Austin, 2018 – WA
- B. parva Harrison, Rix, Harvey & Austin, 2018 – SA
- B. pidax Harrison, Rix, Harvey & Austin, 2018 – SA
- B. plata Harrison, Rix, Harvey & Austin, 2018 – QLD
- B. raveni Harrison, Rix, Harvey & Austin, 2018 – QLD
- B. tariae Harrison, Rix, Harvey & Austin, 2018 – WA
- B. tunstilli Harrison, Rix, Harvey & Austin, 2018 – SA
- B. wingellina Harrison, Rix, Harvey & Austin, 2018 – WA
