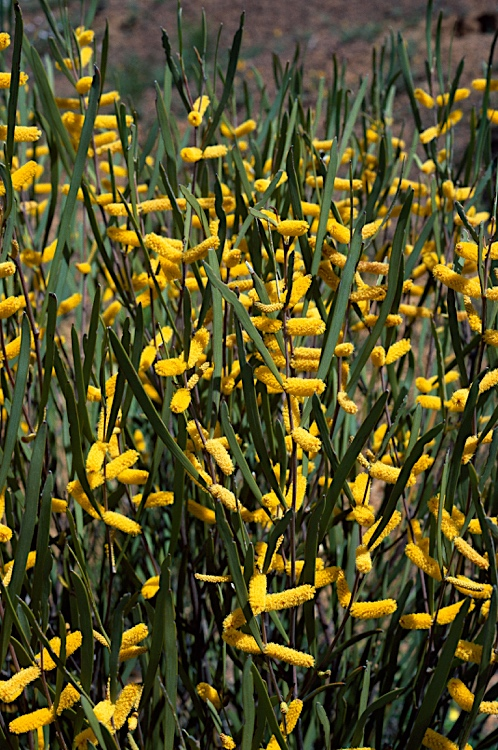
- var. stereophylla

Scientific classification
- Kingdom: Plantae
- Clade: Embryophytes
- Clade: Tracheophytes
- Clade: Spermatophytes
- Clade: Angiosperms
- Clade: Eudicots
- Clade: Rosids
- Order: Fabales
- Family: Fabaceae
- Subfamily: Caesalpinioideae
- Clade: Mimosoid clade
- Genus: Acacia
- Species: A. stereophylla

Binomial name
- Acacia stereophylla Meisn.
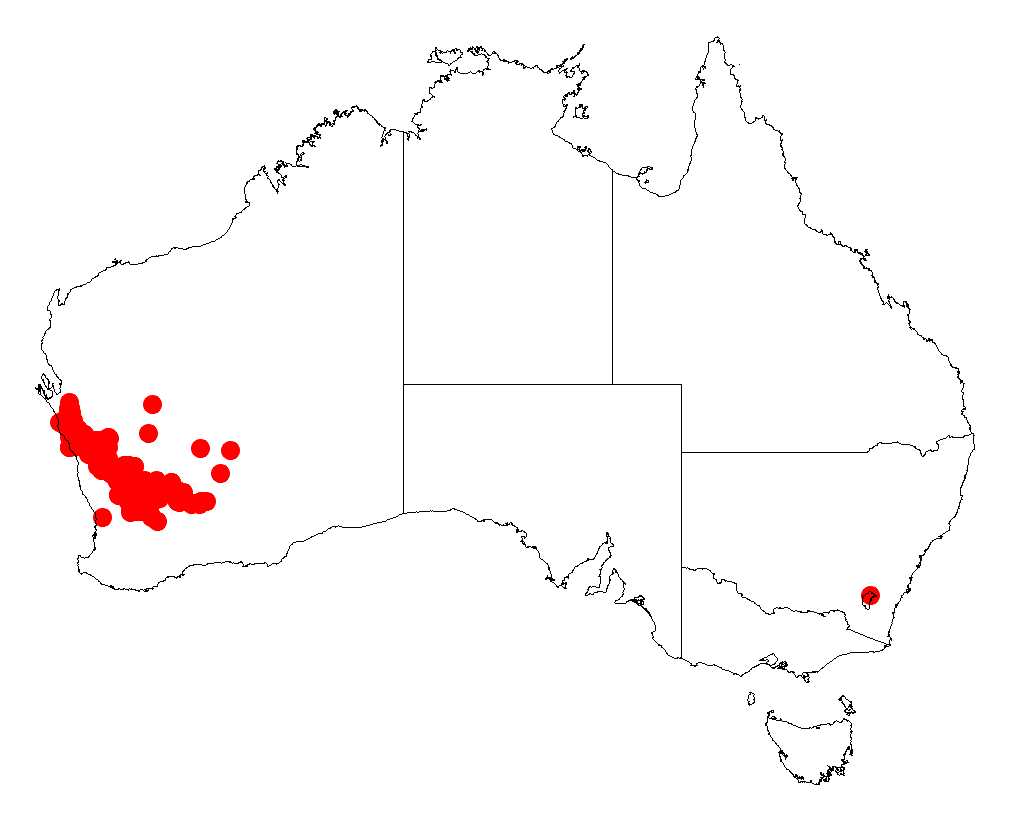
- Occurrence data from AVH

= Acacia stereophylla =

Species of legume

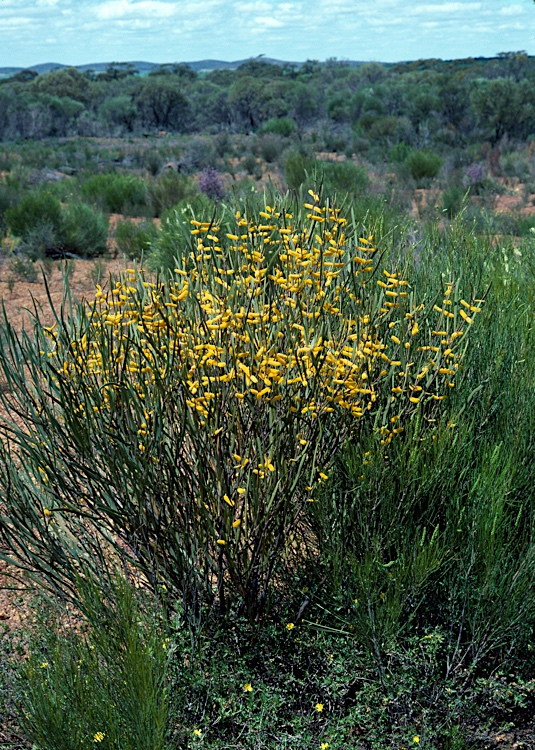
Habit (var. stereophylla) near Mullewa

Acacia stereophylla, also known as stiff-leaf wodjil, is a tree or shrub belonging to the genus Acacia and the subgenus Juliflorae that is endemic to south western Australia.

== Description ==
The tree or shrub typically grows to a height of 1 to 6 metres (3 to 20 ft). It has glabrous branchlets that are hairy in the axils. Like most species of Acacia it has phyllodes rather than true leaves. The evergreen phyllodes are ascending to erect with a straight to shallowly incurved shape. They have a length of 10 to 18 cm (3.9 to 7.1 in) and a width of 1.3 to 6.5 mm (0.051 to 0.256 in) and have many closely parallel fine nerves. It blooms from June or August to October producing yellow flowers.

== Taxonomy ==
There are two varieties:

- Acacia stereophylla var. cylindrata
- Acacia stereophylla var. stereophylla

== Distribution ==
It is native to a large area in the Mid West and Wheatbelt region of Western Australia. The bulk of the population of found from around Kalbarri National Park in the north west down to around Tammin in the south east and to around Boorabbin in the east.

== See also ==
- List of Acacia species
