= Euoplos inornatus =

Scientific classification
- Kingdom: Animalia
- Phylum: Arthropoda
- Subphylum: Chelicerata
- Class: Arachnida
- Order: Araneae
- Infraorder: Mygalomorphae
- Family: Idiopidae
- Genus: Euoplos
- Species: E. inornatus

Binomial name
- Euoplos inornatus (Rainbow & Pulleine, 1918)

Synonyms
- Albaniana inornata Rainbow & Pulleine, 1918; Albaniana flavomaculata Rainbow & Pulleine, 1918; Armadalia setosa Rainbow & Pulleine, 1918

Species of spider

Euoplos inornatus is a species of mygalomorph spider in the Idiopidae family. It is endemic to Australia. It was described in 1918 by Australian arachnologists William Joseph Rainbow and Robert Henry Pulleine.

== Distribution and habitat ==
The species occurs in south-west Western Australia in open jarrah and marri forest habitats. The type locality is Armadale, now a suburb of Perth.

== Behaviour ==
The spiders are fossorial, terrestrial predators. They construct burrows with thick, plug-like trapdoors.
