= Blakistonia aurea =

Scientific classification
- Kingdom: Animalia
- Phylum: Arthropoda
- Subphylum: Chelicerata
- Class: Arachnida
- Order: Araneae
- Infraorder: Mygalomorphae
- Family: Idiopidae
- Genus: Blakistonia
- Species: B. aurea

Binomial name
- Blakistonia aurea Hogg, 1902

Species of spider

Blakistonia aurea, also known as the Adelaide trapdoor spider or the yellow trapdoor spider, is a species of mygalomorph spider in the Idiopidae family. It is endemic to Australia. It was described in 1902 by British arachnologist Henry Roughton Hogg.

== Distribution and habitat ==
The species occurs in South Australia in the southern gulfs region, including the northern Eyre Peninsula, Mount Lofty and Flinders Ranges, extending into western New South Wales and north-western Victoria, in open forest and woodland habitats. Type localities are Adelaide, Blakiston and the Mount Lofty Ranges.

== Behaviour ==
The spiders are fossorial, terrestrial predators. The burrows have thick soil trapdoors and are constructed in heavy clay soils, such as those in creek banks and clay-pans.
