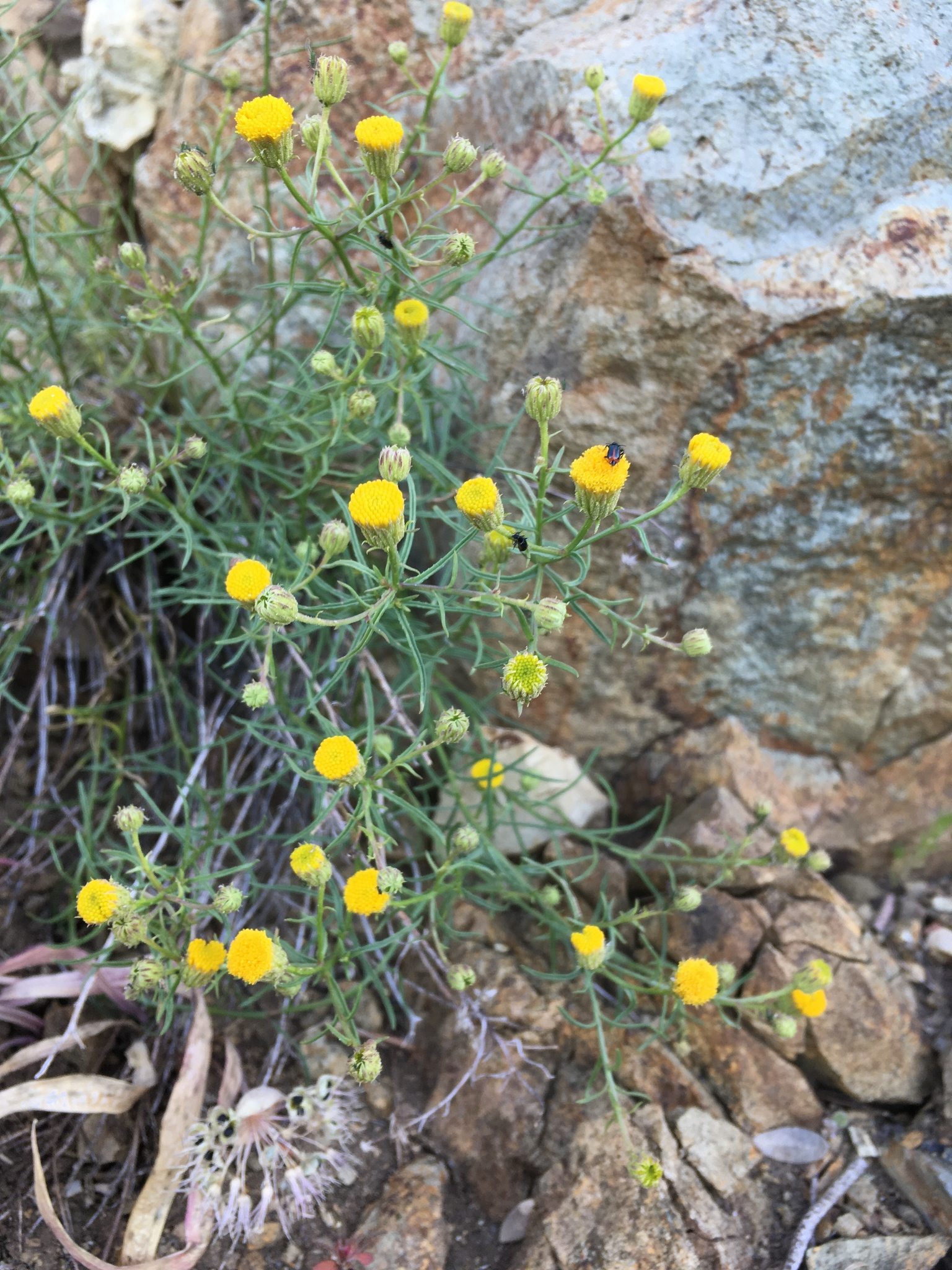
- Erigeron reductus var. reductus

Scientific classification
- Kingdom: Plantae
- Clade: Tracheophytes
- Clade: Angiosperms
- Clade: Eudicots
- Clade: Asterids
- Order: Asterales
- Family: Asteraceae
- Genus: Erigeron
- Species: E. reductus

Binomial name
- Erigeron reductus (Cronquist) G.L.Nesom

Synonyms
- Erigeron inornatus var. reductus Cronquist; Erigeron inornatus var. angustatus A.Gray

= Erigeron reductus =

Species of flowering plant

Erigeron reductus is a species of flowering plant in the family Asteraceae known by the common name lesser California rayless fleabane. It is endemic to California, from Trinity County south as far as Alameda County and El Dorado County.

Erigeron reductus grows in rocky habitats in several mountain ranges in the northern part of the state. It is a perennial herb producing several spreading to erect stems up to 30 centimeters (12 inches) long from a woody caudex and root system. Each stem is lined evenly with small, thready leaves and topped with an inflorescence of one or more flower heads. Each glandular flower head is up to a centimeter (0.4 inches) wide and contains many yellow disc florets but no ray florets. The fruit is an achene with a pappus of bristles.

Varieties

- Erigeron reductus var. angustatus (A.Gray) G.L.Nesom - Coast Ranges from Trinity County to Alameda County
- Erigeron reductus var. reductus - Trinity Mountains and Sierra Nevada from Trinity County to El Dorado County

The two varieties do intergrade in their region of overlap (Trinity County).
