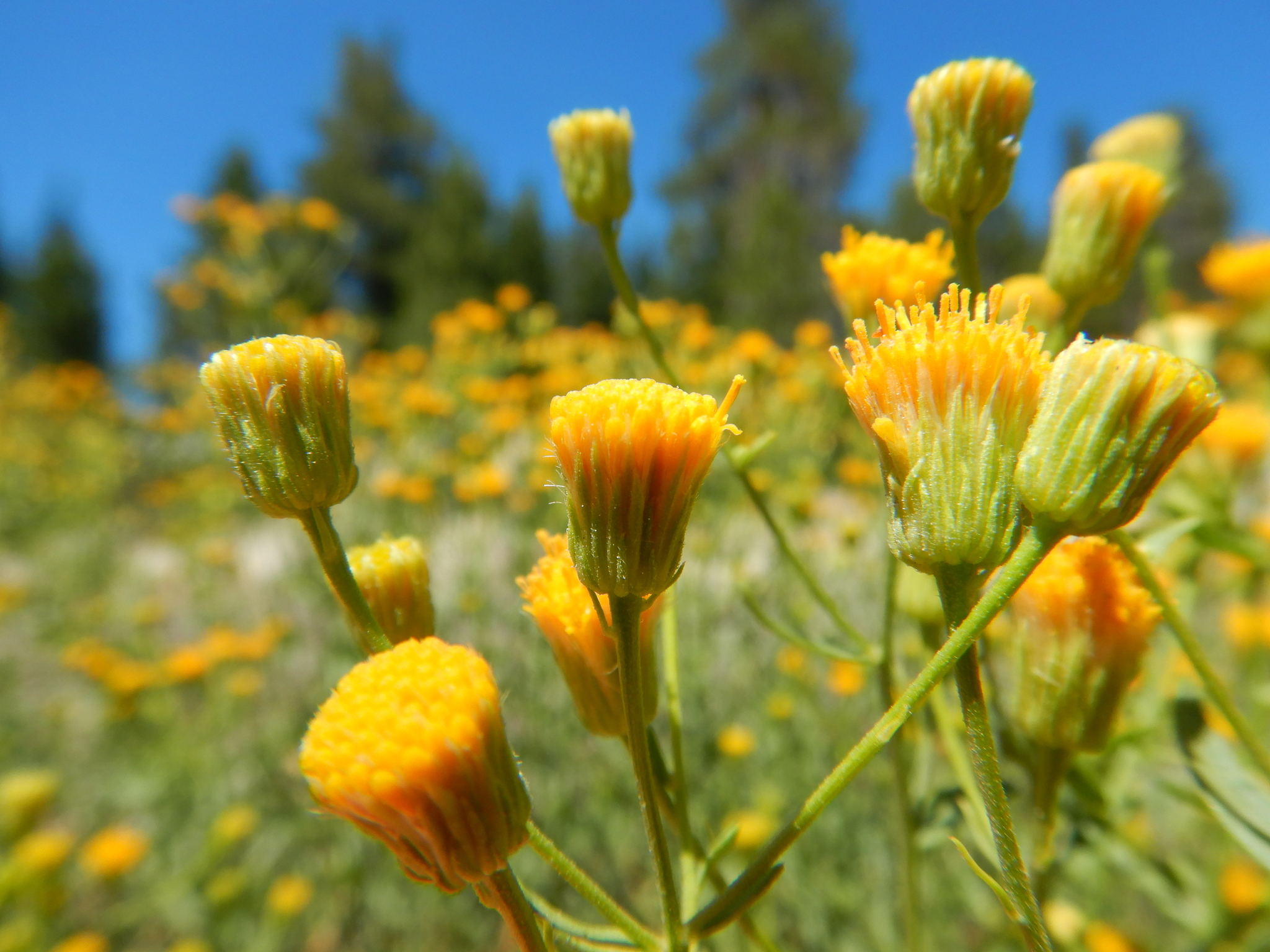

Scientific classification
- Kingdom: Plantae
- Clade: Tracheophytes
- Clade: Angiosperms
- Clade: Eudicots
- Clade: Asterids
- Order: Asterales
- Family: Asteraceae
- Genus: Erigeron
- Species: E. inornatus

Binomial name
- Erigeron inornatus (A.Gray) A.Gray

Synonyms
- Erigeron foliosus var. inornatus A.Gray; Erigeron foliosum var. inornatum A.Gray

= Erigeron inornatus =

Species of flowering plant

Erigeron inornatus is a North American species of flowering plant in the family Asteraceae known by the common name California rayless daisy, California rayless fleabane, rayless fleabane, Lava rayless fleabane

Erigeron inornatus is native to the western United States, primarily in the mountains of Oregon and California but with additional populations in Washington, Idaho, and Nevada.

Erigeron inornatus is a perennial herb variable in appearance, up to 90 cm (3 feet) tall, with hairy or hairless foliage. The leaves extend all the way up the stem and are narrow and several centimeters long. Atop each branch of the stem is an inflorescence of 1-15 flower heads, each about a centimeter (0.4 inches) wide and flat-topped. Each head contains numerous golden yellow to wispy white disc florets but no ray florets.

Varieties

- Erigeron inornatus var. inornatus - California, Nevada, Oregon, Idaho, Washington
- Erigeron inornatus var. calidipetris G.Nesom - California from Siskiyou Co to Plumas Co
- Erigeron inornatus var. keilii G.Nesom - California in Fresno Co + Tulare Co
