= Euoplos =

Scientific classification
- Kingdom: Animalia
- Phylum: Arthropoda
- Subphylum: Chelicerata
- Class: Arachnida
- Order: Araneae
- Infraorder: Mygalomorphae
- Family: Idiopidae
- Genus: Euoplos; Rainbow, 1914

Type species
- E. spinnipes Rainbow, 1914

Species
- 24, see text

Synonyms
- Albaniana Rainbow & Pulleine, 1918; Armadalia Rainbow & Pulleine, 1918; Bancroftiana Rainbow & Pulleine, 1918; Tambouriniana Rainbow & Pulleine, 1918

Genus of spiders

Euoplos is a genus of armoured trapdoor spiders that is endemic to Australia. It was first described by William Joseph Rainbow in 1914.

== Species ==
As of March 2023 the genus contained 25 species found in the states of New South Wales (NSW), Queensland (QLD), South Australia (SA), Victoria (VIC) or Western Australia (WA):

- Euoplos bairnsdale (Main, 1995) – VIC
- Euoplos ballidu (Main, 2000) – WA
- Euoplos booloumba Wilson & Rix, 2021 – QLD
- Euoplos cornishi Rix, Wilson & Harvey, 2019 – WA
- Euoplos crenatus Wilson, Rix & Raven, 2019 – QLD
- Euoplos dignitas Wilson, Rix & Oliver, 2023 – QLD
- Euoplos eungellaensis (Wilson, Harvey & Rix, 2022) – QLD
- Euoplos festivus (Rainbow & Pulleine, 1918) – WA
- Euoplos goomboorian Wilson, Rix & Raven, 2019 – QLD
- Euoplos grandis Wilson & Rix, 2019 – QLD
- Euoplos hoggi (Simon, 1908) – SA, WA
- Euoplos inornatus (Rainbow & Pulleine, 1918) – WA
- Euoplos jayneae Wilson & Rix, 2021 – QLD
- Euoplos kalbarri Rix, Wilson & Harvey, 2019 – WA
- Euoplos mcmillani (Main, 2000) – WA
- Euoplos ornatus (Rainbow & Pulleine, 1918) – QLD
- Euoplos raveni Wilson & Rix, 2021 – QLD
- Euoplos regalis Wilson & Rix, 2021 – QLD
- Euoplos saplan Rix, Wilson & Harvey, 2019 – WA
- Euoplos schmidti Wilson & Rix, 2021 – QLD
- Euoplos similaris (Rainbow & Pulleine, 1918) – QLD
- Euoplos spinnipes Rainbow, 1914 (type) – QLD
- Euoplos thynnearum Wilson, Rix & Raven, 2019 – QLD
- Euoplos turrificus Wilson, Rix & Raven, 2019 – QLD
- Euoplos variabilis (Rainbow & Pulleine, 1918) – NSW, QLD
