= Mount Gibson, Western Australia =

Locality in Western Australia

Coordinates: 29.607°S 117.411°E

Mount Gibson, Western Australia is located on the Wubin - Mount Magnet section of the Great Northern Highway in the mid-west region of Western Australia.

== Sheep and conservation ==
Mount Gibson is also the name of a pastoral lease (sheep station) and a nature conservancy project.

== Mining ==
In the early twentieth century it was a gold exploration area, and continued to be of interest for some time. Currently it is the site of an iron ore mine.

The iron ore mine and operations were suspended at various stages due to contract negotiations between the mining companies and their clients.

Iron ore is moved first by road to Perenjori where it is hauled by rail to the port of Geraldton.
