= Specific name =

In taxonomy, specific name refers either of these two meanings, each with its own set of rules:

- Specific name (botany), the two-part (binomial) name of a plant species. The species epithet refers to the second part of the name.
- Specific name (zoology), the second part (the species epithet) of the name of an animal species
