= Michael G. Rix =

Australian arachnologist

- Education: University of Western Australia
- Scientific career
- Fields: biology, zoology, arachnology
- Workplaces: Queensland Museum
- Thesis: Taxonomy and systematics of the Australian Micropholcommatidae (Arachnida: Araneae) (2009)
- Author abbrev. (zoology): Rix

Michael Gordon Rix is an Australian arachnologist, whose publications mainly concern spiders.

As of February 2020, he was Principal Curator of Arachnology and Research Fellow in the Biodiversity and Geosciences Program at the Queensland Museum. He has held numerous professional appointments including President of the Society of Australian Systematic Biologists and Associate Editor of the Journal of Arachnology. He is widely published and cited. The World Spider Catalog lists 166 species names and 22 genus names authored or co-authored by Rix, as of February 2020. Pseudoanyphaena michaelrixi, discovered in 2003, was named after him.

His interest in spiders developed as a boy. He has interest in Australian trapdoor spiders and his research into their decline over the past decade.

In early 2020 Rix expressed concern over the likely extinction of the assassin spider — Zephyrarchaea austini — also called the pelican spider, which is only known to occur in the Western River Wilderness Protection Area on Kangaroo Island, as a result of the catastrophic 2020 bush fires.
