= List of common spider species of Australia =

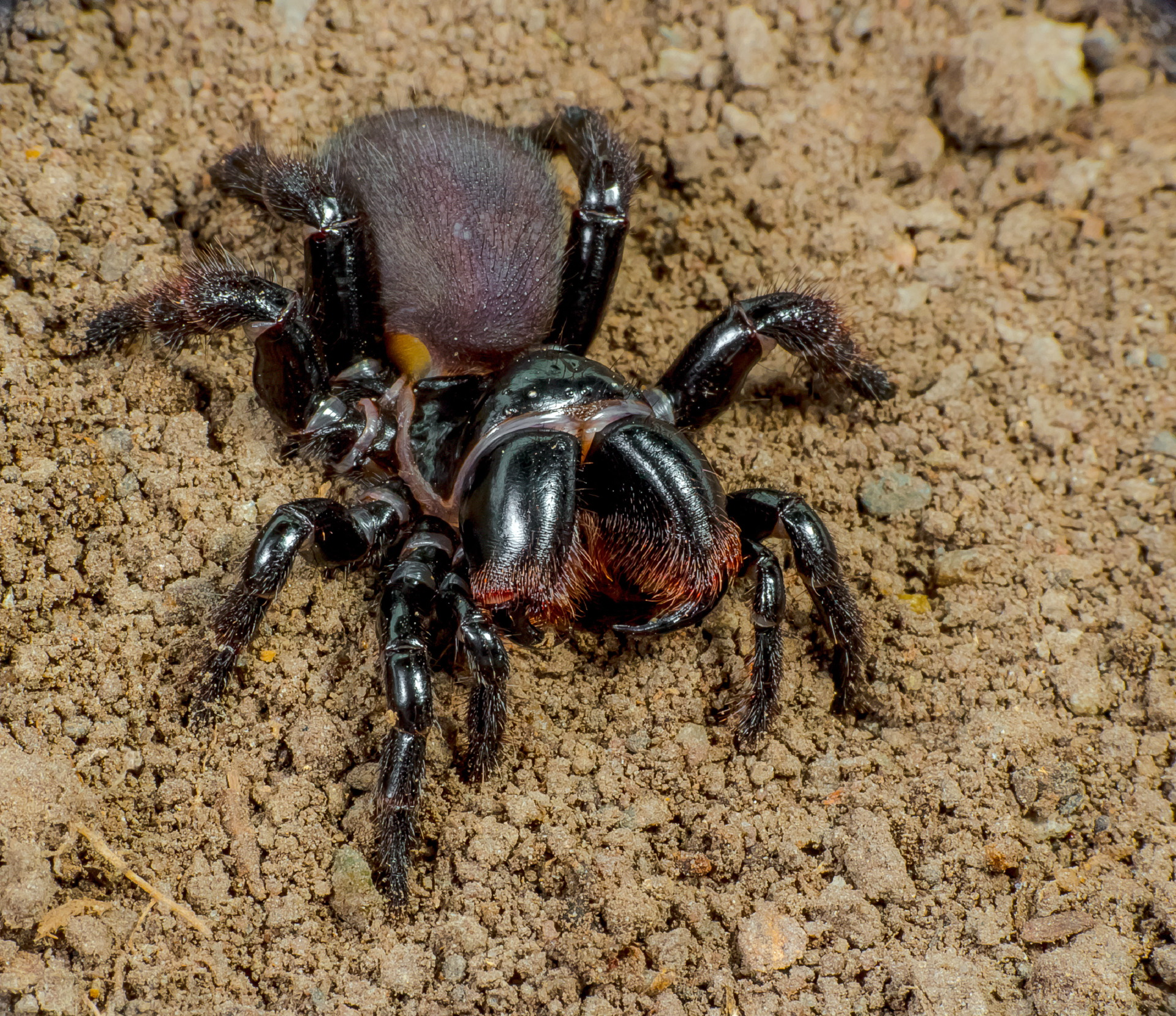
Mygalomorphae Actinopodidae Missulena bradleyi Eastern Mouse Spider The Gap Brisbane

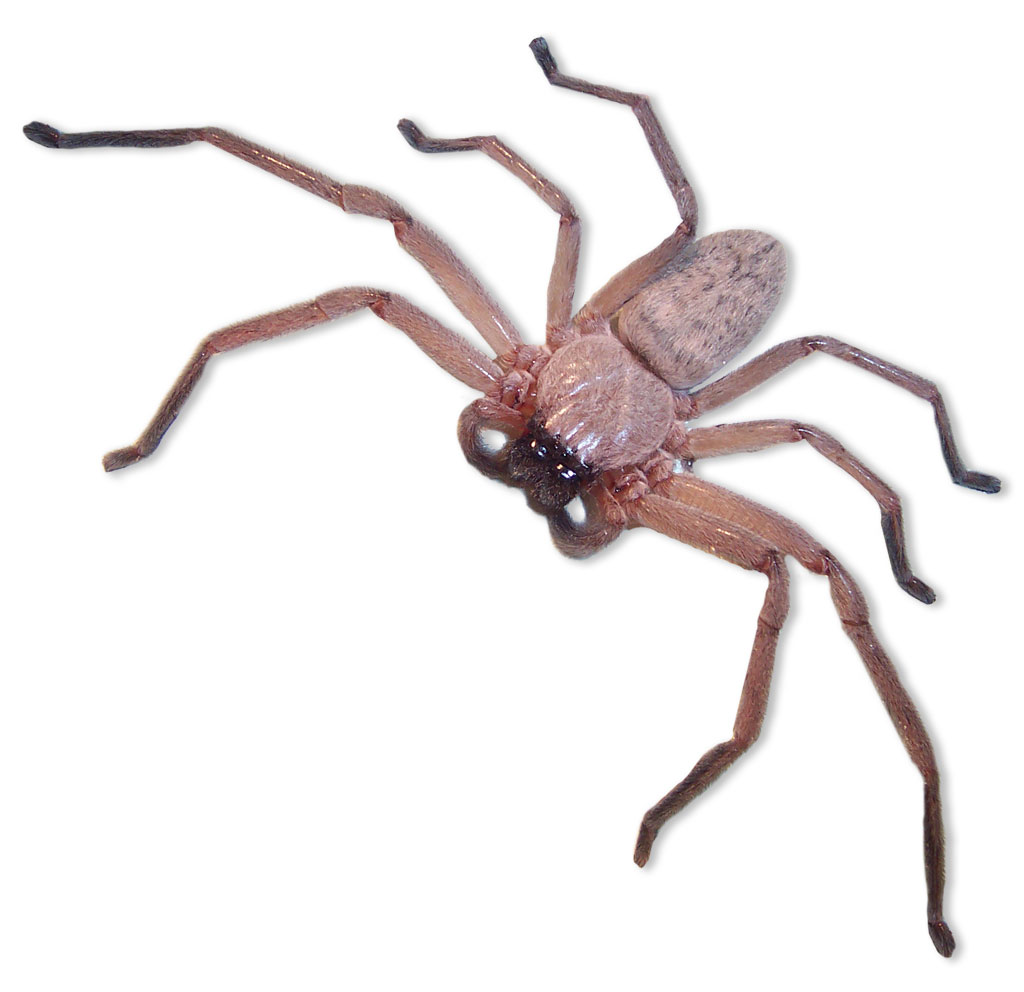
Huntsman spider

This is a partial list of Australian spiders and harvestmen (Orders Araneae and Opiliones).

== Order Araneae ==
Family Actinopodidae

Missulena spp. Mouse spiders

Family Araneidae

Arachnura higginsii, Scorpion-tailed spider
Argiope keyserlingi, St Andrew's cross spider
Argiope protensa, Teardrop spider or longtailed orb-weaving spider
Argiope trifasciata, Banded orb-weaving spider
Austracantha minax, Christmas Jewel Spider
Celaenia excavata, Bird-dropping spider
Cyrtophora spp., Tent spiders
Socca pustulosa, Garden orbweb spider
Hortophora transmarina, Wheelweaving orbweaving spider
Ordgarius magnificus, Magnificent spider
Phonognatha graeffei, Leaf curling spider
Plebs bradleyi, Enamelled spider
Poecilopachys australasia, Two-spined spider

Family Atracidae

Atrax robustus, Sydney funnel-web spider
Atrax spp. Funnel-web spiders
Hadronyche spp. Funnel-web spiders
Illawarra wisharti, Illawarra funnel-web spider

Family Gradungulidae

Hickmania troglodytes, Tasmanian cave spider

Family Barychelidae

Idioctis spp., Intertidal trapdoor spider
Idiommata spp., Brushfooted trapdoor spider
Seqocrypta jakara, Brush footed spider

Family Clubionidae

Clubiona robusta, Stout sac spider

Family Corinnidae

Poecilipta spp., Ant-mimicking spiders
Nyssus coloripes, Painted swift spider

Family Deinopidae

Asianopis subrufa, Rufous net-casting spider

Family Desidae

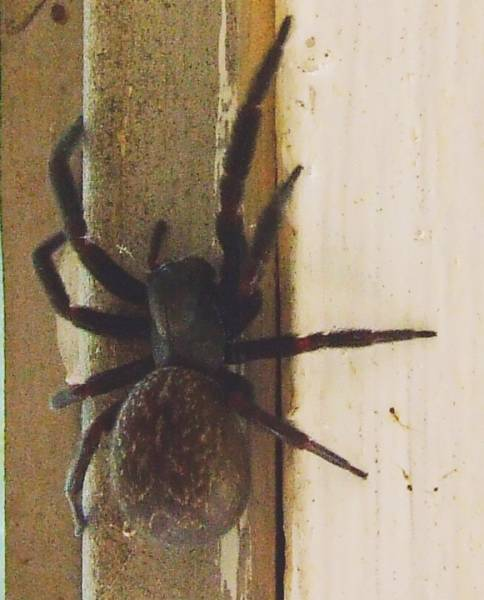
Black house spider Badumna insignis (Desidae)

Badumna insignis, Black house spider
Badumna longinqua, Brown house spider

Family Dipluridae

Troglodiplura lowryi, Nullarbor cave trapdoor spider

Family Dysderidae

Dysdera crocata, Woodlouse spider

Family Gnaphosidae

Anzacia gemmea, Silvery vagabond spider

Family Hersiliidae

Tamopsis spp., Two-tailed spiders

Family Hexathelidae

Plesiothele fentoni, Lake Fenton trapdoor spider

Family Idiopidae

Aganippe spp. Trapdoor spiders
Arbanitis spp., Golden trapdoor spider
Blakistonia aurea, Adelaide trapdoor spider
Euoplos spp., armoured trapdoor spiders
Idiosoma nigrum, Shieldbacked trapdoor spider
Misgolas rapax, Sydney brown trapdoor spider
Misgolas robertsi, Tube spider

Family Lamponidae

Lampona cylindrata, Whitetailed spider
Lampona murina, Whitetailed spider

Family Lycosidae

Venatrix furcillata, Little striped wolf spider
Tasmanicosa godeffroyi, Garden wolf spider

Family Mimetidae

Australomimetus spp., Pirate spiders

Family Miturgidae

Miturga spp., Lined spiders

Family Nemesiidae

Aname diversicolor, Black wishbone spider

Family Nicodamidae

Nicodamus spp., Red-and-black spiders

Family Oecobiidae

Oecobius navus, Wall spider

Family Pholcidae

Pholcus phalangioides, Daddy long-legs spider

Family Pycnothelidae

Stanwellia grisea, Melbourne trapdoor spider

Family Pisauridae

Megadolomedes australianus, Giant water spider

Family Salticidae

Helpis minitabunda, Bronze Aussie jumper
Maratus spp. Peacock Spiders
Mopsus mormon, Northern Green Jumping spider
Myrmarachne spp., Ant-mimicking spider
Sandalodes spp. Large Jumping Spiders

Family Scytodidae

Scytodes thoracica, Common Spitting spider

Family Sparassidae

Delena cancerides, Flat Huntsman spider, Social Huntsman Spider or Avondale spider
Holconia immanis, Sydney Huntsman spider, Large Huntsman spider, Giant Huntsman spider, Grey Huntsman Spider
Neosparassus spp., Badge Huntsman spiders and Shield Huntsman spiders
Pandercetes gracilis, Lichen huntsman

Family Stiphidiidae

Stiphidion facetum, Sombrero spider

Family Tetragnathidae

Tetragnatha spp., Four-jawed spider

Family Theraphosidae

Selenocosmia crassipes, Coastal Whistling spider
Selenocosmia stirlingi, Australian Common Whistling spider
Selenotypus plumipes, Australian Featherleg spider

Family Theridiidae

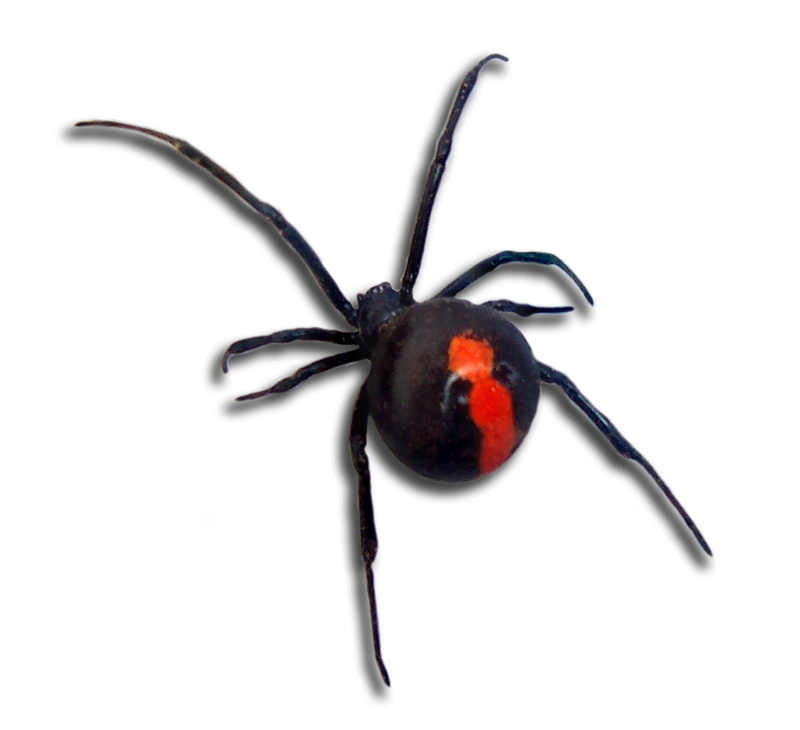
Redback Latrodectus hasselti

Ariamnes spp., Whip spiders
Latrodectus hasselti, Redback spider
Nesticodes rufipes, Red-legged House spider
Steatoda grossa, Cupboard spider
Thwaitesia argentiopunctata, Silver Dewdrop spider

Family Thomisidae

Amyciaea albomaculata, Green Tree Ant Mimicking spider
Australomisidia spp. Australian Crab Spiders
Hedana spp., Green Crab spider
Stephanopis altifrons, Knobbly Crab spider
Thomisus spectabilis, Australian Crab Spider
Zygometis xanthogaster Yellow-tailed Crab Spider

Family Trochanteriidae

Hemicloea rogenhoferi, Flattened bark spider

Family Uloboridae

Zosis geniculata, White-kneed spider

== Order Opiliones ==
Family Gagrellidae

Nelima doriae, introduced daddy-longlegs

Family Phalangiidae

Spinicrus spp., Harvestmen

Family Triaenychidae

Equitius spp., Harvestmen
Hickmanoxyomma spp., Cave harvestman
Triaenobunus spp., Harvestmen

== See also ==
- Spider attacks in Australia
