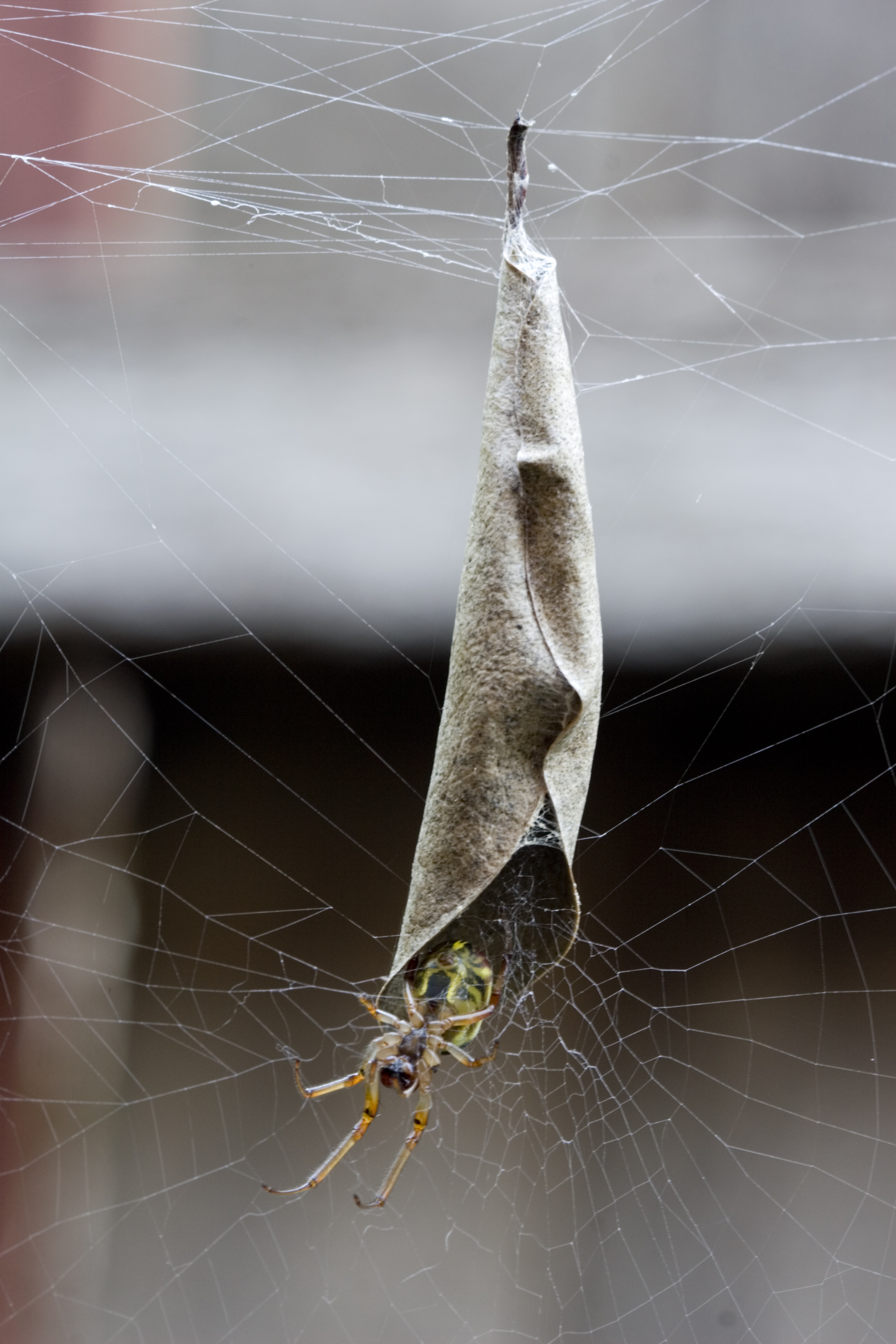
- Phonognatha graeffei

Scientific classification
- Domain: Eukaryota
- Kingdom: Animalia
- Phylum: Arthropoda
- Subphylum: Chelicerata
- Class: Arachnida
- Order: Araneae
- Infraorder: Araneomorphae
- Family: Araneidae
- Genus: Phonognatha; Simon, 1894

Type species
- P. graeffei (Keyserling, 1865)

Species
- 4, see text

Synonyms
- Singotypa Simon, 1894

= Phonognatha =

Genus of spiders

Phonognatha is a genus of South Pacific orb-weaver spiders first described by Eugène Simon in 1895. It was originally placed with the long-jawed orb weavers, and was moved to Araneidae in 2008.

The leaf curling spider (Phonognatha graeffei) is a common Australian spider found in urban areas as well as woodlands of the northeastern, eastern, and southern states. Phonognatha vicitra was formerly placed in the genus, but it has been shown to be a misidentification of Acusilas coccineus.

== Species ==
As of April 2019 it contains four species:

- Phonognatha graeffei (Keyserling, 1865) (type) – Australia
- Phonognatha melania (L. Koch, 1871) – Australia
- Phonognatha neocaledonica Berland, 1924 – New Caledonia
- Phonognatha tanyodon Kallal & Hormiga, 2018 – Australia (Queensland, New South Wales)
