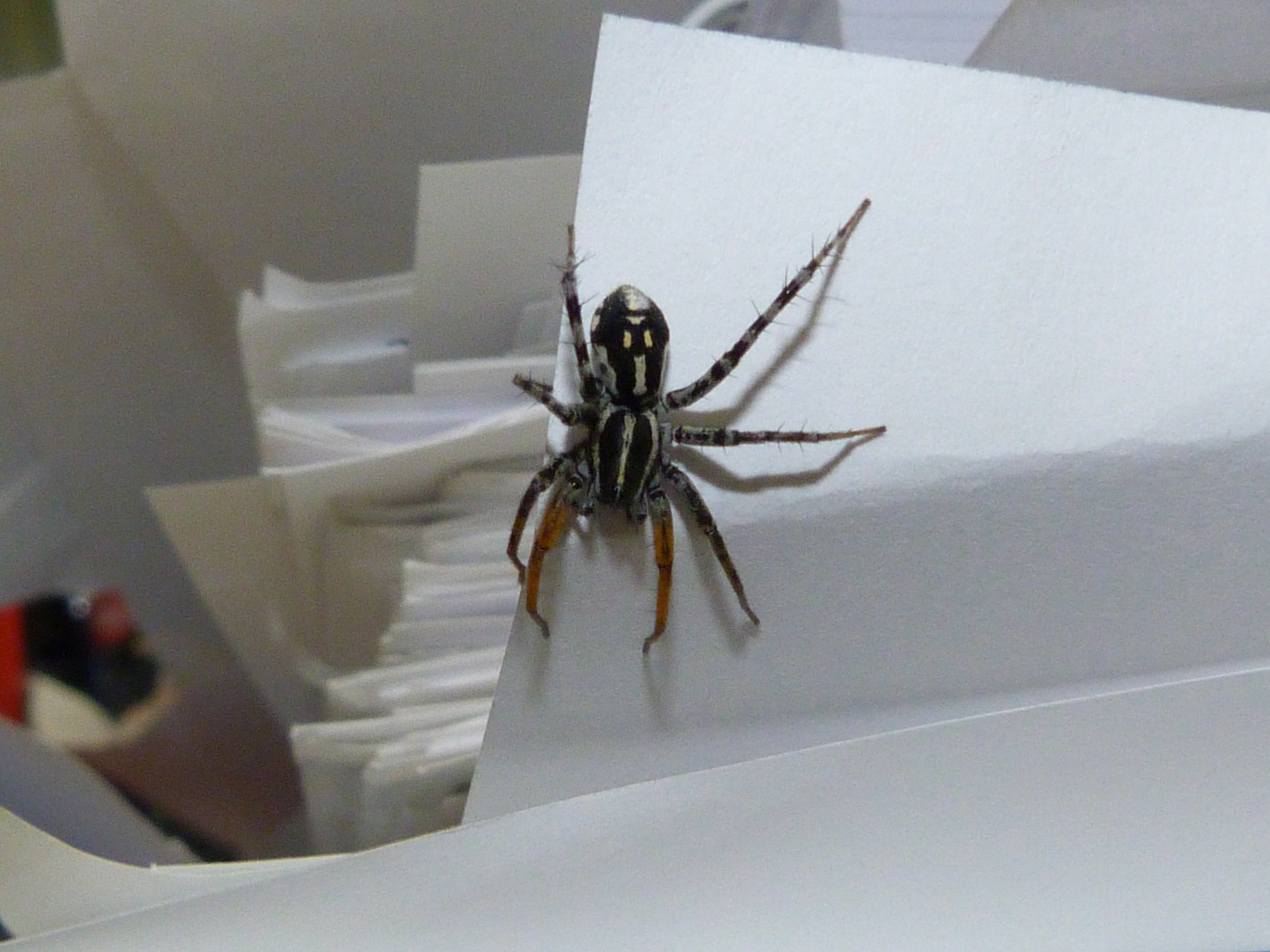
- S. picta

Scientific classification
- Domain: Eukaryota
- Kingdom: Animalia
- Phylum: Arthropoda
- Subphylum: Chelicerata
- Class: Arachnida
- Order: Araneae
- Infraorder: Araneomorphae
- Family: Corinnidae
- Genus: Nyssus; Walckenaer, 1805

Type species
- N. coloripes Walckenaer, 1805

Species
- 15, see text

Synonyms
- Anchognatha; Supunna

= Nyssus =

Genus of spiders

Nyssus is a genus of corinnid sac spiders first described by Charles Athanase Walckenaer in 1805.

== Species ==
As of March 2019 it contains fifteen species:

- Nyssus albopunctatus (Hogg, 1896) — Australia (Northern Territory, New South Wales, Tasmania), New Zealand
- Nyssus avidus (Thorell, 1881) — Australia (Queensland)
- Nyssus coloripes Walckenaer, 1805 — Australia (mainland, Tasmania). Introduced to New Zealand
- Nyssus emu Raven, 2015 — Australia (Queensland)
- Nyssus insularis (L. Koch, 1873) — Fiji, Solomon Is.
- Nyssus jaredwardeni Raven, 2015 — Australia (Queensland)
- Nyssus jonraveni Raven, 2015 — Australia (South Australia, Queensland)
- Nyssus loureedi Raven, 2015 — Australia (Lord Howe Is.)
- Nyssus luteofinis Raven, 2015 — Australia (Queensland)
- Nyssus paradoxus Raven, 2015 — Australia (Queensland)
- Nyssus pseudomaculatus Raven, 2015 — Australia (Queensland, New South Wales)
- Nyssus robertsi Raven, 2015 — Australia (Queensland)
- Nyssus semifuscus Raven, 2015 — Australia (Queensland)
- Nyssus wendyae Raven, 2015 — Australia (Queensland)
- Nyssus yuggera Raven, 2015 — Australia (Queensland, New South Wales)
