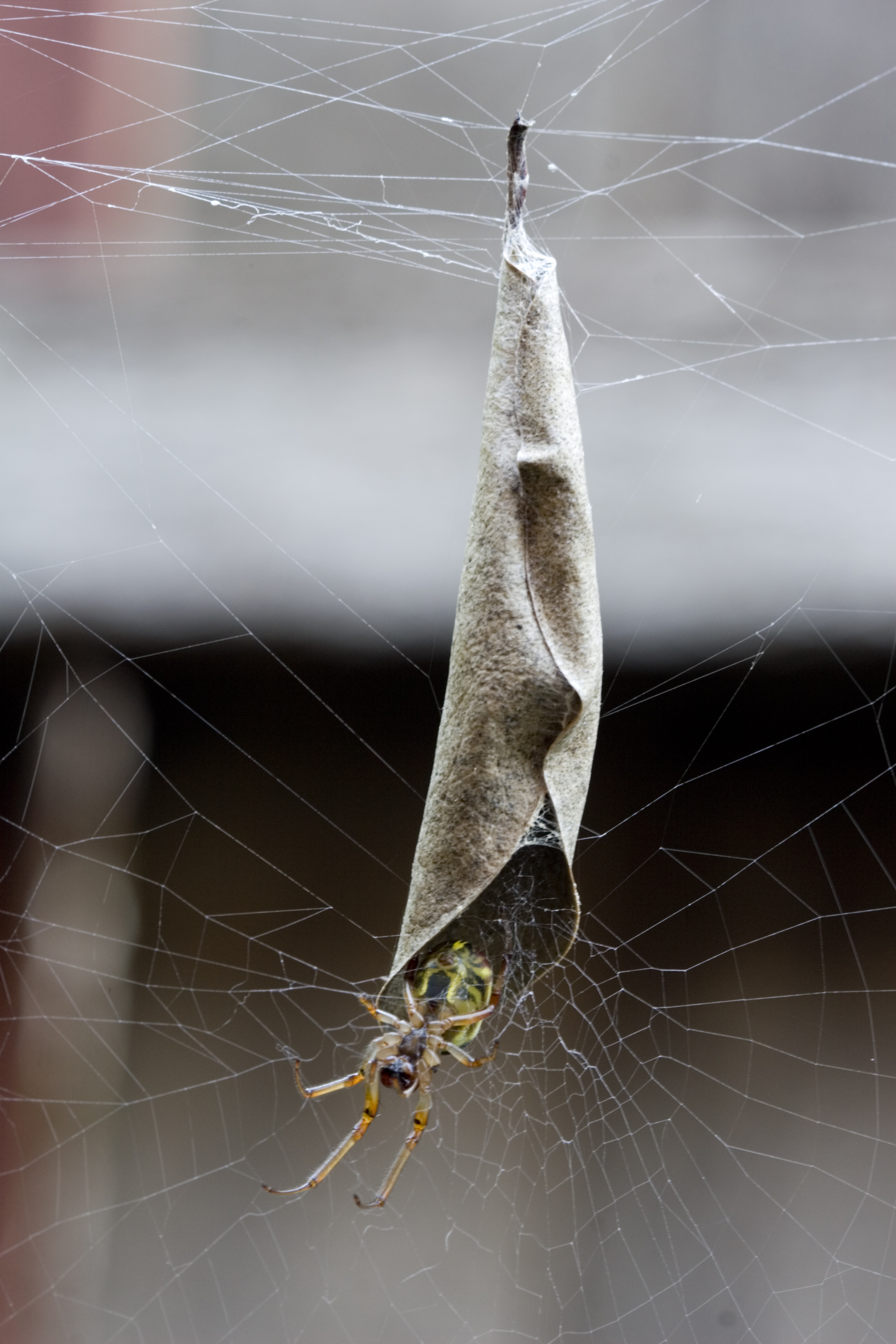

Scientific classification
- Domain: Eukaryota
- Kingdom: Animalia
- Phylum: Arthropoda
- Subphylum: Chelicerata
- Class: Arachnida
- Order: Araneae
- Infraorder: Araneomorphae
- Family: Araneidae
- Genus: Phonognatha
- Species: P. graeffei

Binomial name
- Phonognatha graeffei Keyserling, 1865 (Australia)

= Phonognatha graeffei =

Species of spider

Phonognatha graeffei, referred to as the leaf curling spider, is a common Australian spider found in woodlands and urban areas in the northeastern, eastern and southern states. A member of the family Araneidae, the orb-weavers, it was previously placed in Tetragnathidae.

The spider is distinguished by having a curled leaf at the centre of its web, in which it shelters. The species form pairs living together in the same leaf, though at opposite ends of their shelter, even before mating at maturity. The female creates a separate curled leaf "nursery" hung in foliage nearby.

== Appearance ==
The eye arrangement of spiders in the genus Phonognatha

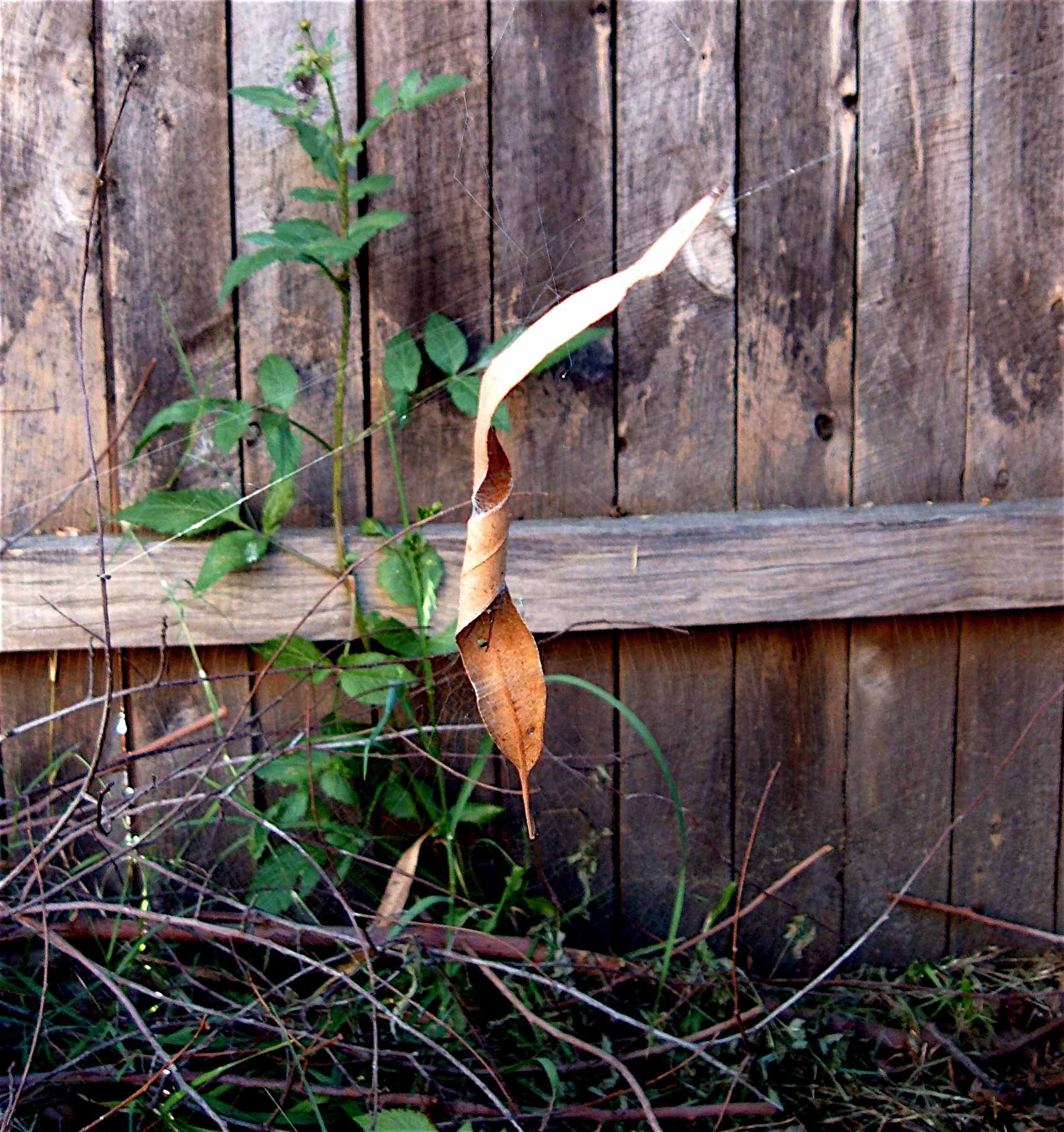
Phonognatha graeffei in retreat

The body length of the male is 5 to 6mm and female 8 to 12mm. Males and females look very similar with red-brown legs and body and a cream coloured pattern on their backs. Their bodies are fat and oval shaped with long tapered legs.

== Web ==
The web, with its shelter at the centre, is easily identifiable. The leaf curling spider cleverly weaves a leaf or other object into the centre of its web as a hide-away from birds and other predators. Leaves are twisted along their length to form a funnel, (sometimes with a silk wall on one side, if necessary) that the spider can retreat into. They have also been known to use old snail shells and discarded pieces of paper. Although often found clustered in the same area, each spider has its own web.

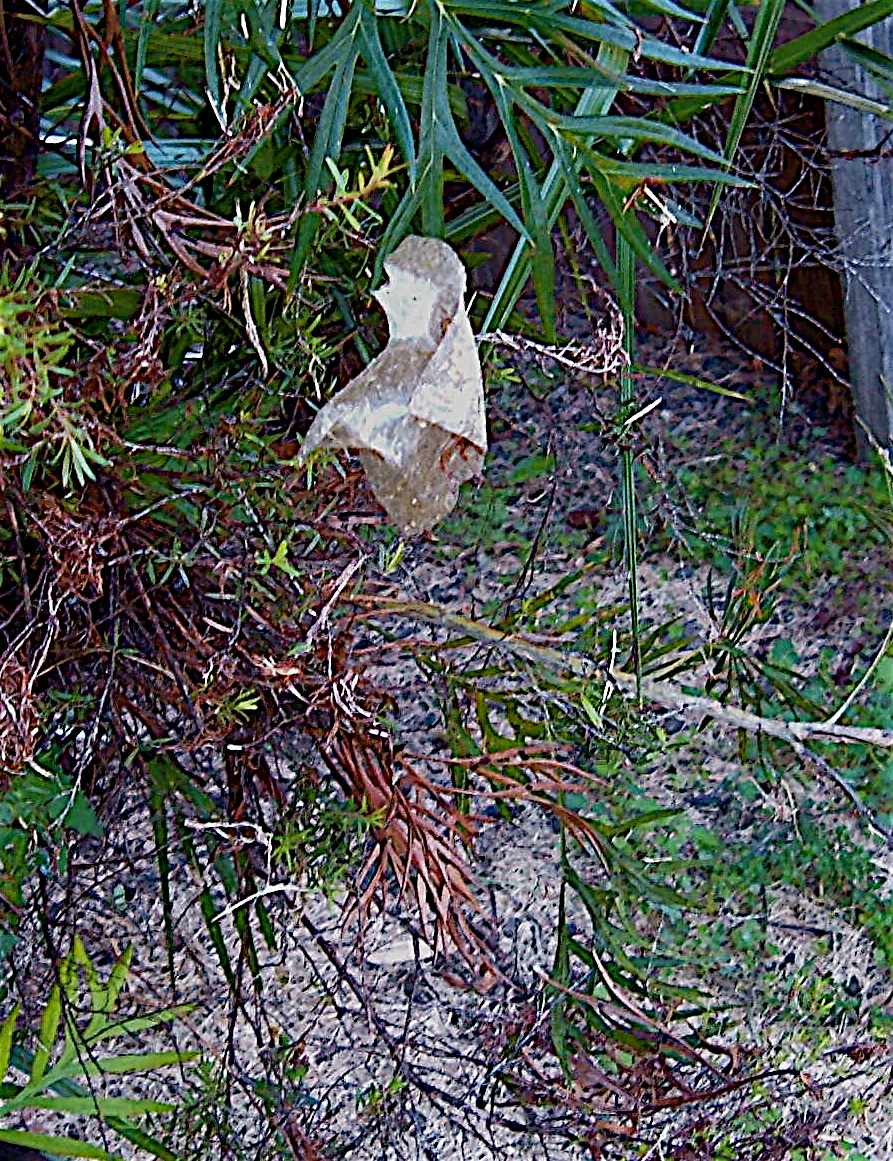
P. graeffei in scrap paper.

The leaf curling spider's web is about 30 cm in diameter. It is an incomplete circle, being open at the top and fanning downwards. The spider uses supporting threads attached to a shrub to suspend its curled-up dry leaf, with the fan-like main web radiating out from the leaf in which the spider hides, with only the tips of its legs visible, feeling for the vibrations of insects colliding with the web. It only goes outside its shelter if prey becomes stuck in the web, or if the web needs repair. The spider usually rebuilds its web at night.

== Behaviour ==
The leaf-curling spiders are day-active orb weavers, protecting themselves from predators by sitting inside their silk-seamed, curled leaf. In P. graeffei this leaf is suspended just above the centre of the web, but may be placed higher in other species. Such leaves may be already be partly curled, though many are not, and the spider pulls and silks its leaf into a retreat cylinder, silked shut at the top and open at the hub. Like other web-weaving spiders, their main food source is flying insects including insects larger than itself.

They are noted for their sexual cohabitation and its function in mate-guarding behaviour. This means that the male and female live together in the same curled leaf, occupying opposite ends of the retreat, with the female at the open end.

=== Mating behaviour ===
The species is unusual among orb-weaving spiders because males cohabit in the leaf retreat with both immature and mature females, mating with the former shortly after the female moults. Male spiders may take up residence nearby, or in the same web as the (often immature) female. Mating takes place as soon as she has her final moult.

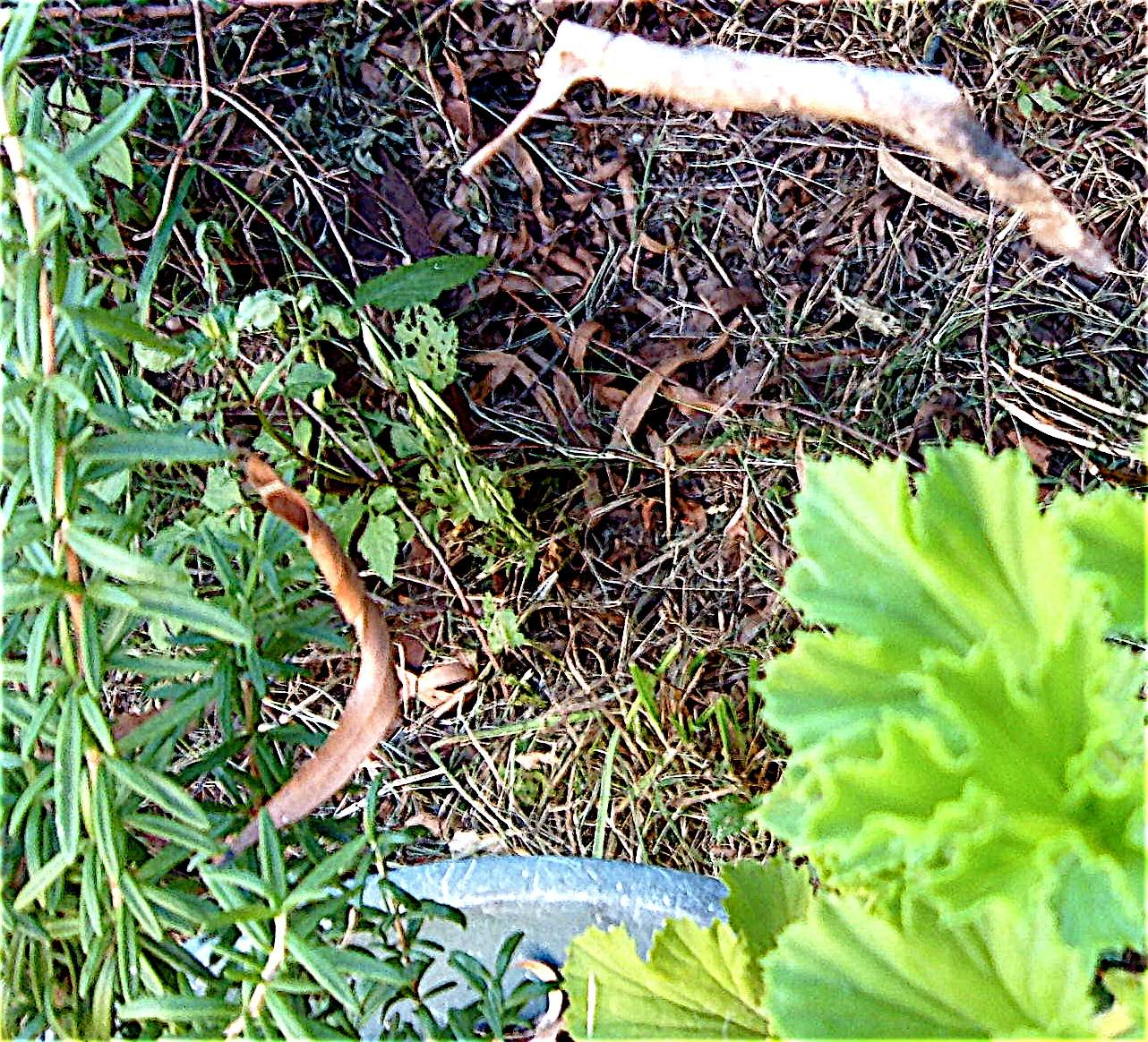
Two retreats in the same web.

According to Babette F. Fahey, M. A. Elgar, cohabitation may be a form of mate-guarding, because resident males challenge rival males that venture onto the web. As well, they consider that the behaviour depends upon the reproductive status of the female since males defending immature females are more aggressive than those defending virgin, adult females.

Males copulate with previously mated females for significantly longer than with virgin females. Females may cannibalise cohabiting males, independently of whether the female has had food, and females that cannibalise a single male are not more fertile than non-cannibalistic females.

The female lays its egg sac within a dead leaf, bent over and silked back on itself. This is suspended among foliage well away from the orb web.

=== Spiderlings ===
Juvenile spiders start by bending over a small green leaf, eventually graduating to larger dead leaves (or the occasional other lightweight objects) that are hoisted up from the ground on silk lines at night.

== Distribution ==
The spider is commonly found in open woodland and forest habitats, as well as urban and suburban gardens in the northeastern, eastern and southern Australian states.

== Phonognatha graeffei and humans ==
The side-ways action fangs are small, and the spider is timid and reluctant to bite. Toxicity to humans is unknown as it is extremely rare for these spiders to bite humans. A bite may result in a localised reaction with pain and swelling, but is not considered dangerous.
