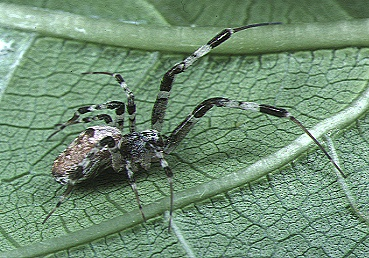
- Female Zosis geniculata
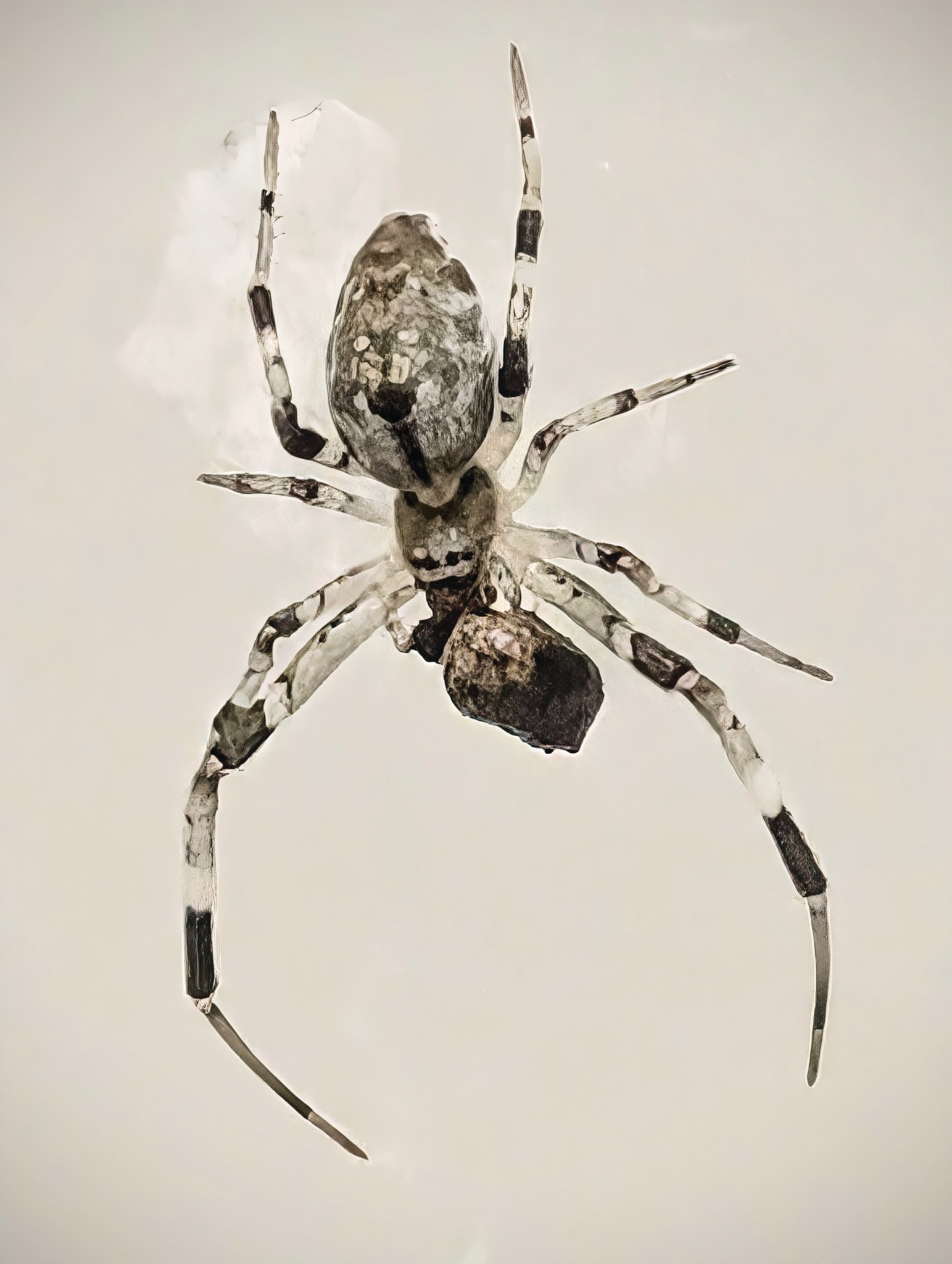
- Z. geniculata

Scientific classification
- Kingdom: Animalia
- Phylum: Arthropoda
- Subphylum: Chelicerata
- Class: Arachnida
- Order: Araneae
- Infraorder: Araneomorphae
- Family: Uloboridae
- Genus: Zosis; Walckenaer, 1841

= Zosis =

Genus of spiders

Zosis is a genus of spiders in the family Uloboridae. Mostly a South American genus, Z. geniculata has been introduced worldwide.

== Species ==
As of October 2025, this genus includes three species and two subspecies:

- Zosis costalimae (Mello-Leitão, 1917) – Brazil
- Zosis geniculata (Olivier, 1789) – USA to Brazil, Caribbean, Galapagos. Introduced to Canada, Macaronesia, St. Helena, West Africa, Seychelles, India, China, Korea, Japan, Indonesia, Philippines, Australia, Pacific Islands (type species)
  - Z. g. fusca (Caporiacco, 1948) – Guyana
  - Z. g. timorensis (Schenkel, 1944) – Timor
- Zosis peruana (Keyserling, 1881) – Colombia to Argentina
