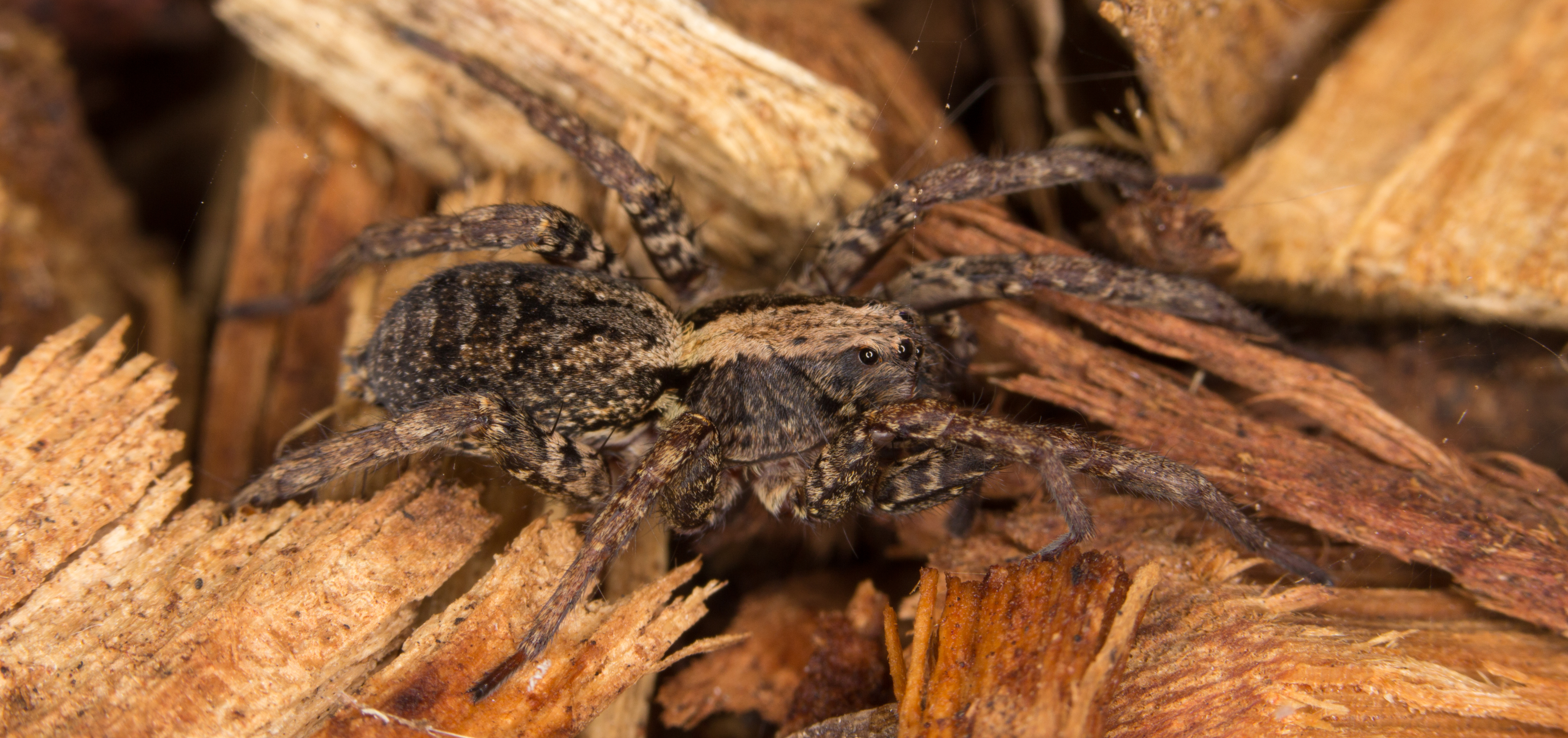
- V. brisbanae or V. ornatula

Scientific classification
- Kingdom: Animalia
- Phylum: Arthropoda
- Subphylum: Chelicerata
- Class: Arachnida
- Order: Araneae
- Infraorder: Araneomorphae
- Family: Lycosidae
- Genus: Venatrix; Roewer

Species
- 27, see text

= Venatrix =

Genus of spiders

Venatrix is a genus of wolf spiders first described by Carl Friedrich Roewer in 1960.

== Species ==
As of 2017, it contains 27 species, all from Australia, with outliers in the Philippines and New Caledonia:

- Venatrix allopictiventris Framenau & Vink, 2001
- Venatrix amnicola Framenau, 2006
- Venatrix archookoora Framenau & Vink, 2001
- Venatrix arenaris (Hogg, 1906)
- Venatrix australiensis Framenau & Vink, 2001
- Venatrix brisbanae (L. Koch, 1878)
- Venatrix esposica Framenau & Vink, 2001
- Venatrix fontis Framenau & Vink, 2001
- Venatrix funesta (C. L. Koch, 1847)
- Venatrix furcillata (L. Koch, 1867)
- Venatrix hickmani Framenau & Vink, 2001
- Venatrix konei (Berland, 1924)
- Venatrix koori Framenau & Vink, 2001
- Venatrix kosciuskoensis (McKay, 1974)
- Venatrix lapidosa (McKay, 1974)
- Venatrix magkasalubonga (Barrion & Litsinger, 1995)
- Venatrix mckayi Framenau & Vink, 2001
- Venatrix ornatula (L. Koch, 1877)
- Venatrix palau Framenau, 2006
- Venatrix penola Framenau & Vink, 2001
- Venatrix pictiventris (L. Koch, 1877)
- Venatrix pseudospeciosa Framenau & Vink, 2001
- Venatrix pullastra (Simon, 1909)
- Venatrix roo Framenau & Vink, 2001
- Venatrix speciosa (L. Koch, 1877)
- Venatrix summa (McKay, 1974)
- Venatrix tinfos Framenau, 2006
