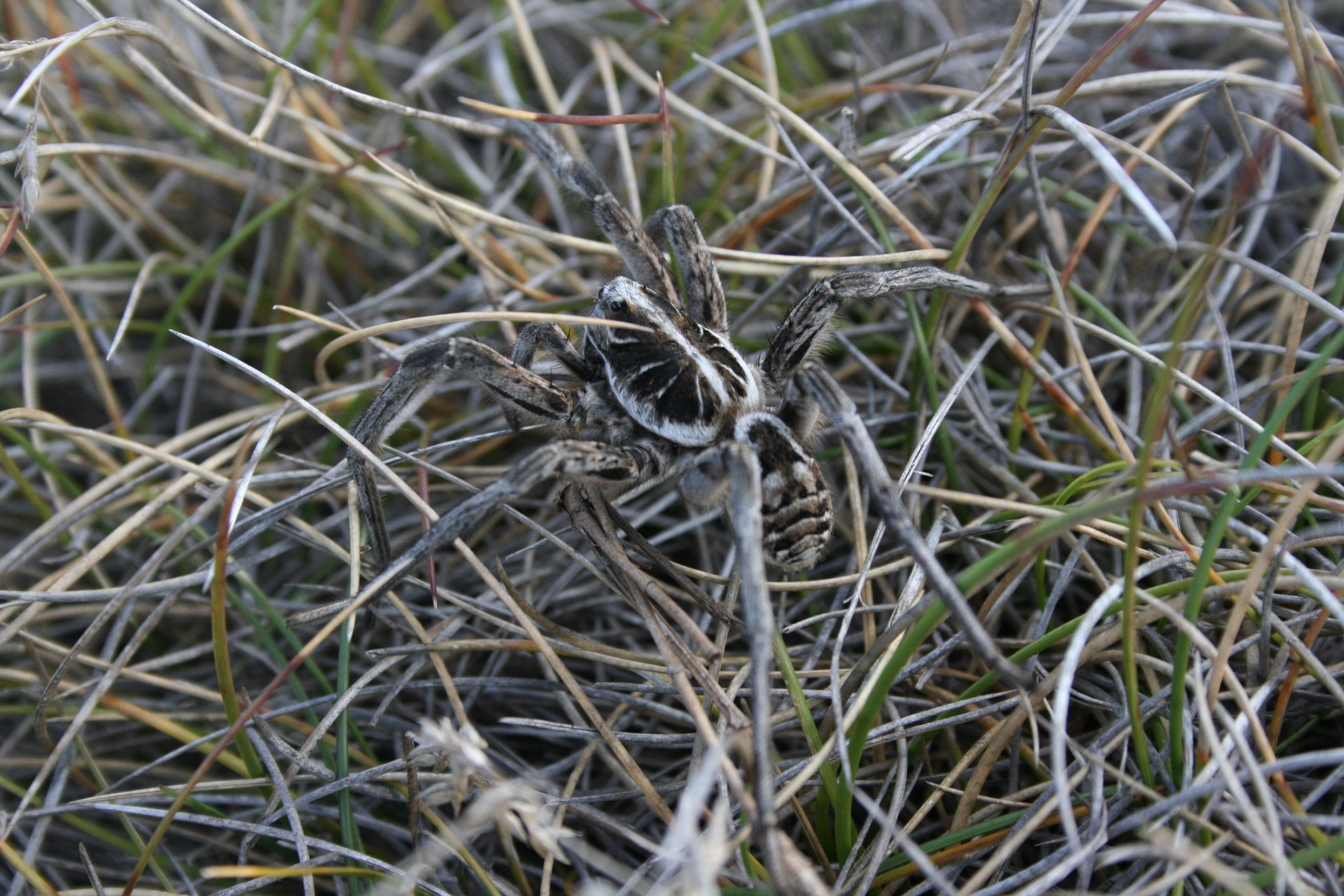
- Tasmanicosa sp.

Scientific classification
- Kingdom: Animalia
- Phylum: Arthropoda
- Subphylum: Chelicerata
- Class: Arachnida
- Order: Araneae
- Infraorder: Araneomorphae
- Family: Lycosidae
- Genus: Tasmanicosa; Roewer

Species
- 14, see text

= Tasmanicosa =

Genus of spiders

Tasmanicosa is a genus of spiders in the family Lycosidae. It was first described in 1959 by Roewer. As of 2017, it contains 14 species, all from Australia.

== Species ==
Tasmanicosa comprises the following species:

- Tasmanicosa fulgor Framenau & Baehr, 2016
- Tasmanicosa gilberta (Hogg, 1906)
- Tasmanicosa godeffroyi (L. Koch, 1865)
- Tasmanicosa harmsi Framenau & Baehr, 2016
- Tasmanicosa hughjackmani Framenau & Baehr, 2016
- Tasmanicosa kochorum Framenau & Baehr, 2016
- Tasmanicosa leuckartii (Thorell, 1870)
- Tasmanicosa musgravei (McKay, 1974)
- Tasmanicosa phyllis (Hogg, 1906)
- Tasmanicosa ramosa (L. Koch, 1877)
- Tasmanicosa salmo Framenau & Baehr, 2016
- Tasmanicosa semicincta (L. Koch, 1877)
- Tasmanicosa stella Framenau & Baehr, 2016
- Tasmanicosa subrufa (Karsch, 1878)
