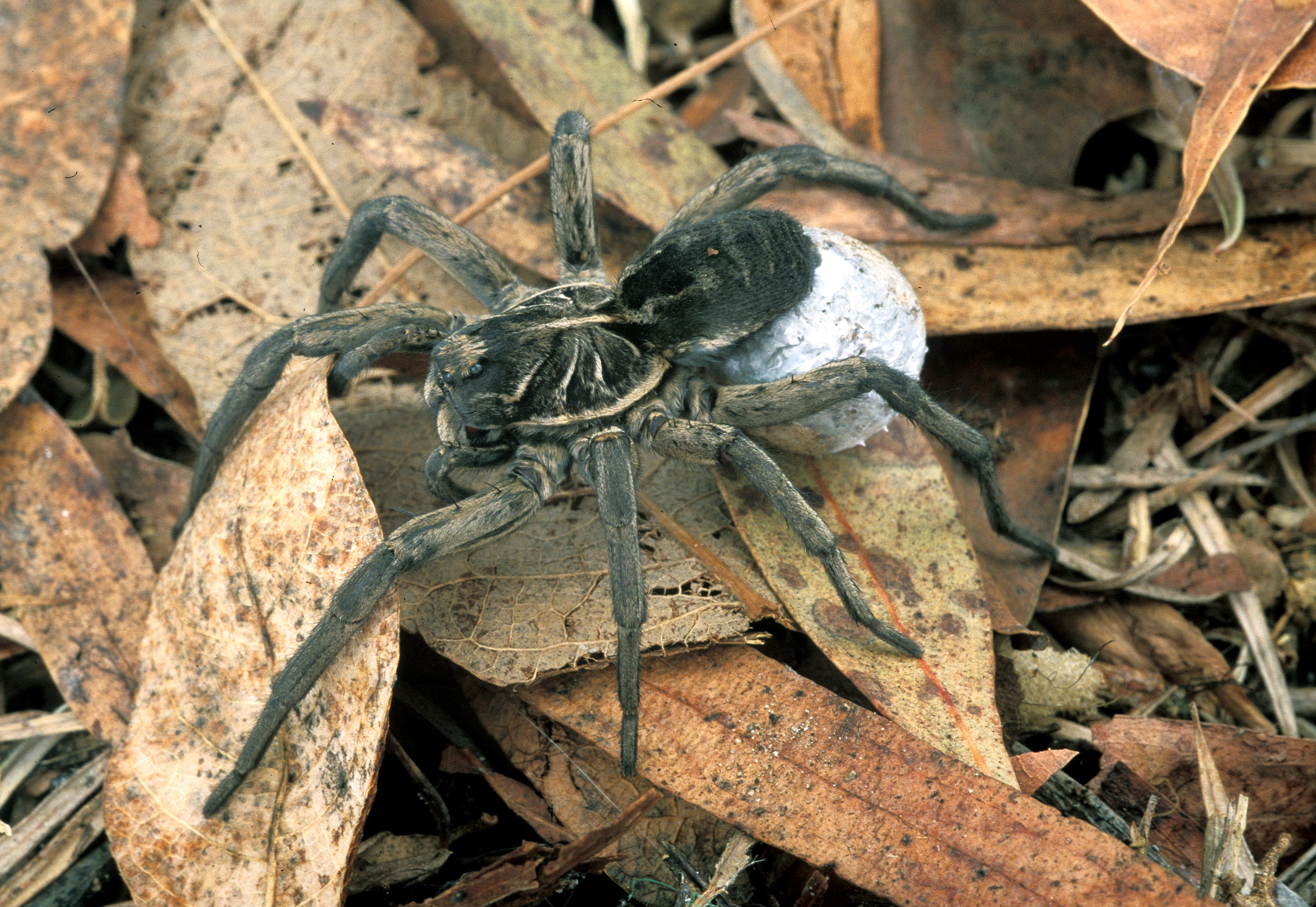
- Female
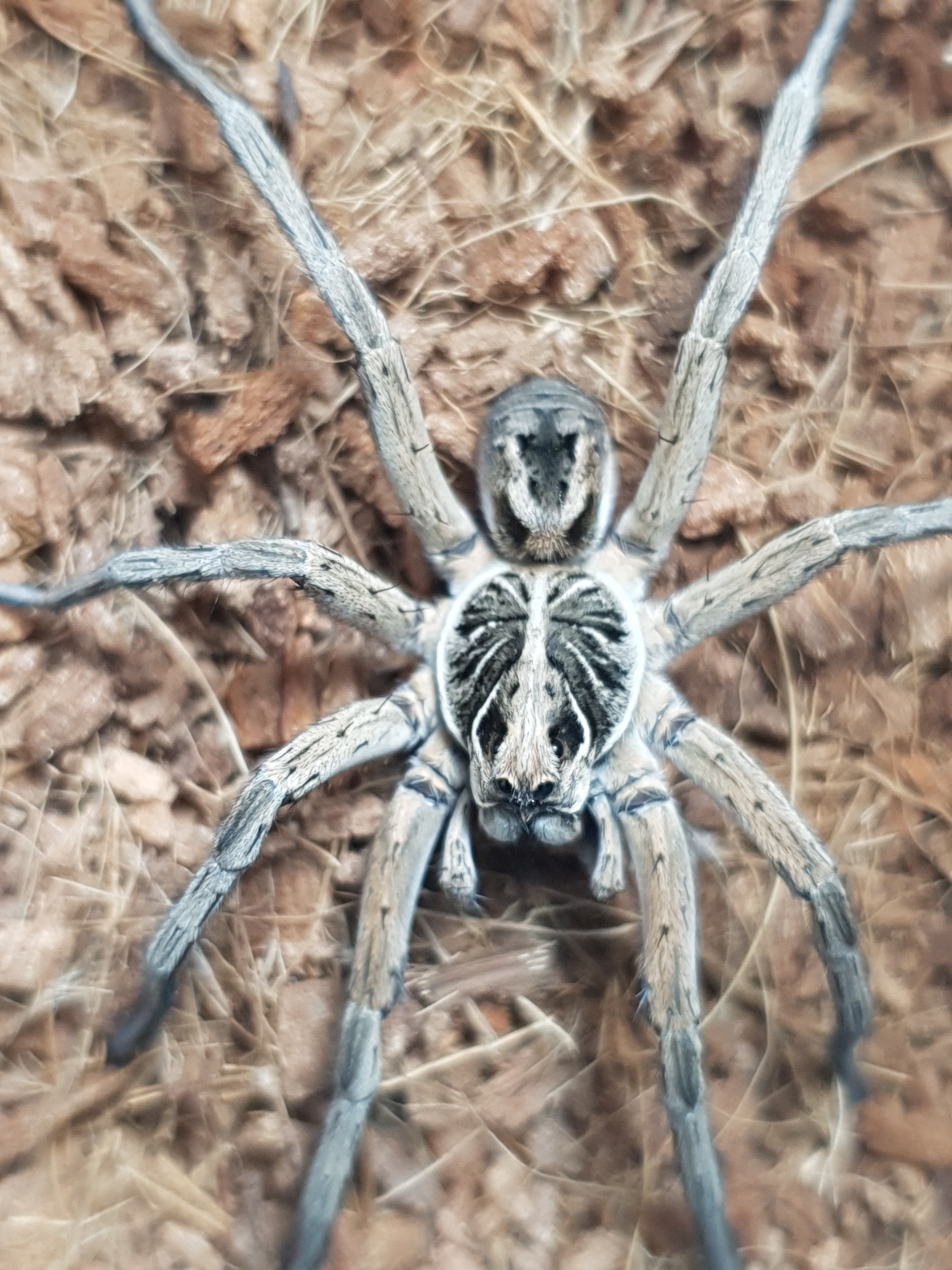
- Male

Scientific classification
- Kingdom: Animalia
- Phylum: Arthropoda
- Subphylum: Chelicerata
- Class: Arachnida
- Order: Araneae
- Infraorder: Araneomorphae
- Family: Lycosidae
- Genus: Tasmanicosa
- Species: T. godeffroyi

Binomial name
- Tasmanicosa godeffroyi L.Koch, 1865

Synonyms
- Lycosa godeffroyi

= Tasmanicosa godeffroyi =

Species of spider

Tasmanicosa godeffroyi, or garden wolf spider, is a mid-sized wolf spider found in eastern Australia (Queensland, New South Wales, Victoria, Tasmania, South Australia and the Australian Capital Territory) and Western Australia. It is perhaps the most commonly noticed of the wolf spiders in Australia. It is variable in pattern and colour, though the underside of the abdomen is black. Wolf spiders tend to rest at the entrance of their burrows, and their eyes reflect the light of passing cars or torchlight. The burrow has a thin veil of silk, without a lid, unlike some other wolf spiders. The burrow is circular in cross section and travels down for around 15 cm, then parallel with the ground for the next 15 cm. The body length of the female is up to 27 mm, the male 25 mm.
