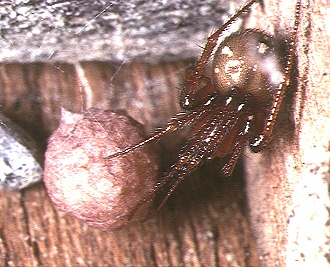
- Female with egg sac
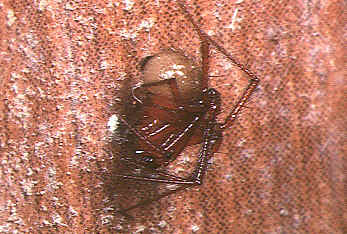
- Male

Scientific classification
- Kingdom: Animalia
- Phylum: Arthropoda
- Subphylum: Chelicerata
- Class: Arachnida
- Order: Araneae
- Infraorder: Araneomorphae
- Family: Theridiidae
- Genus: Nesticodes; Archer, 1950
- Species: N. rufipes

Binomial name
- Nesticodes rufipes (Lucas, 1846)

Synonyms
- Anelosimus nelsoni Bryant, 1945; Robertus pilosus Denis, 1956; Theridion albonotatum Taczanowski, 1872; Theridion bajulans L. Koch, 1875; Theridion borbonicum Vinson, 1863; Theridion flavo-aurantiacum Simon, 1880; Theridion longipes Hasselt, 1882; Theridion luteolum Blackwall, 1859; Theridion luteipes O. Pickard-Cambridge, 1869; Theridion rufipes Lucas, 1846

= Nesticodes =

Monotypic genus of spiders

Nesticodes is a monotypic genus of comb-footed spiders containing only the red house spider [Nesticodes rufipes (Lucas, 1846)]. It was first described by Allan Frost Archer in 1950, and has a pantropical distribution due to ship and air travel.

== Description ==
Nesticodes rufipes is a small red-bodied spider, venomous, but not harmful to humans. They can be extremely common inside homes, building webs in dark corners and under furniture. They have been observed preying on insects such as mosquitoes, flies, and ants.
