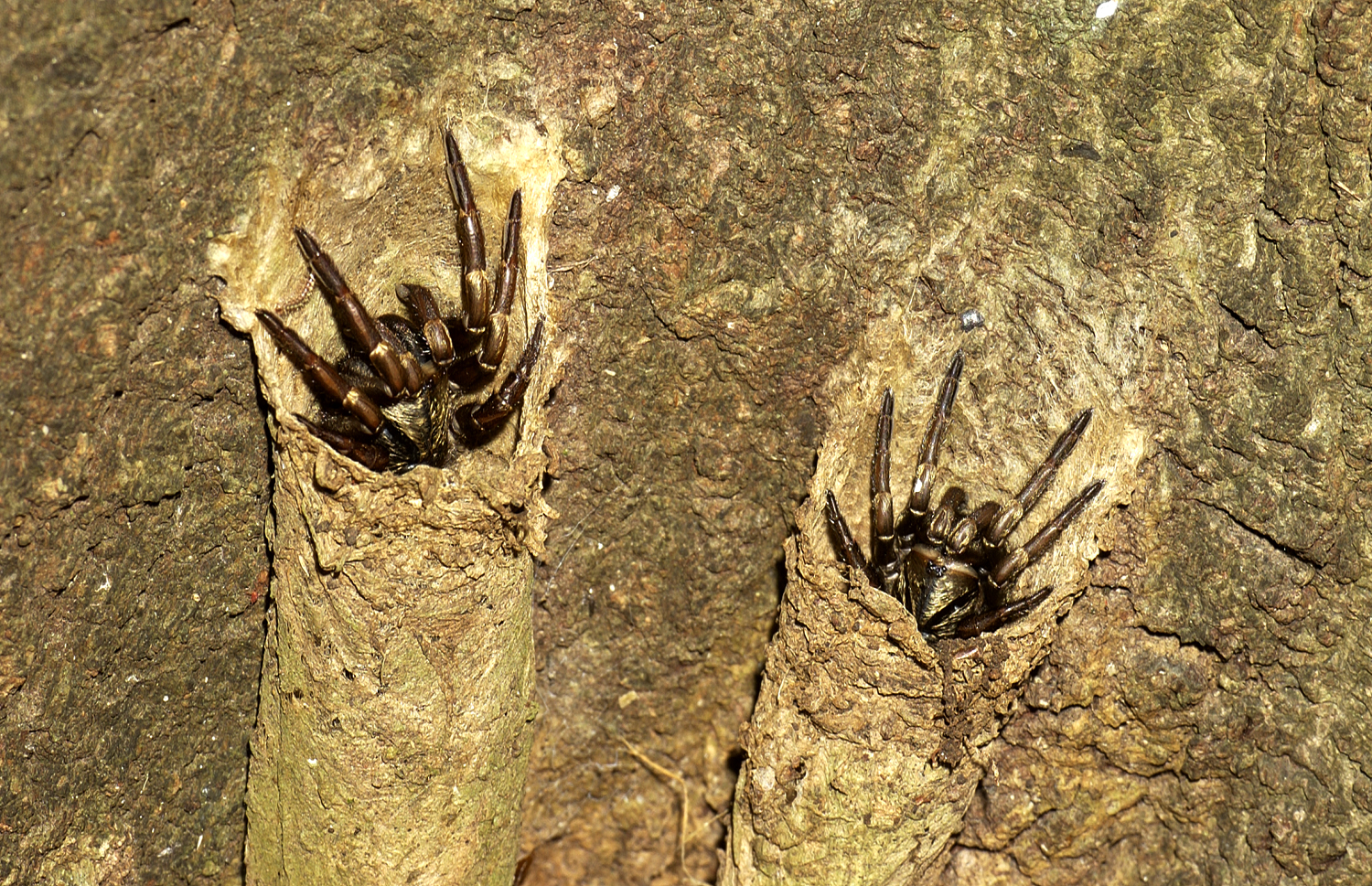
- near Gerringong, Australia

Scientific classification
- Domain: Eukaryota
- Kingdom: Animalia
- Phylum: Arthropoda
- Subphylum: Chelicerata
- Class: Arachnida
- Order: Araneae
- Infraorder: Mygalomorphae
- Family: Idiopidae
- Genus: Arbanitis
- Species: A. robertsi

Binomial name
- Arbanitis robertsi (Main & Mascord, 1974)

Synonyms
- Dyarcyops robertsi Main & Mascord, 1974; Misgolas robertsi (Main & Mascord, 1974)

= Arbanitis robertsi =

Species of spider

Arbanitis robertsi is a species of tube-dwelling spider in the family Idiopidae found in and near rainforests in New South Wales and Queensland, Australia. A mid to large sized spider which builds a tube of web that extends from the burrow. The tube is attached to rocks, tree ferns or the base of trees. Thousands of these tubes were recorded by Sid Jackson in November 1922 at the south eastern end of Wallis Lake. "Up to three feet long, and half an inch wide". Situated on damp ground, close to freshwater streams.

== Description ==
Body length of the female is 27mm, male 17 mm. The male is a darker brown colour and with longer legs than the female. The burrow is usually straight, or slightly inclined with no brood shaft. The burrow usually extends around 30 cm underground. The tube above ground is usually seen around 15 to 20 cm above ground level. The tube is loosely connected to the burrow at ground level, and pulling the tube breaks it above ground and leaves the spider safe underground.

Tube spiders may live in colonies, where tubes are attached to each other, resembling organ pipes. The tubes are camoflauged with particles of earth, moss and lichen. The vibration of crawling insects on the tube is said to alert the spider to potential prey. Prey is caught at the opening of the tube, including moths, beetles and other crawling insects.

== Egg sac ==
The egg sac is 24 mm x 15 mm, rectangular in shape, constructed of white silk, secured within the burrow by the female. Eggs around 50 in number, a golden yellow colour, non glutinous.

== Taxonomy ==
A. robertsi was first described as Dyarcyops robertsi by Barbara York Main & Ramon Mascord in 1974, and was transferred to the genus, Misgolas in 1992 by Graham Wishart, and then to the genus, Arbanitis, in 2017 by Michael Rix and others.
