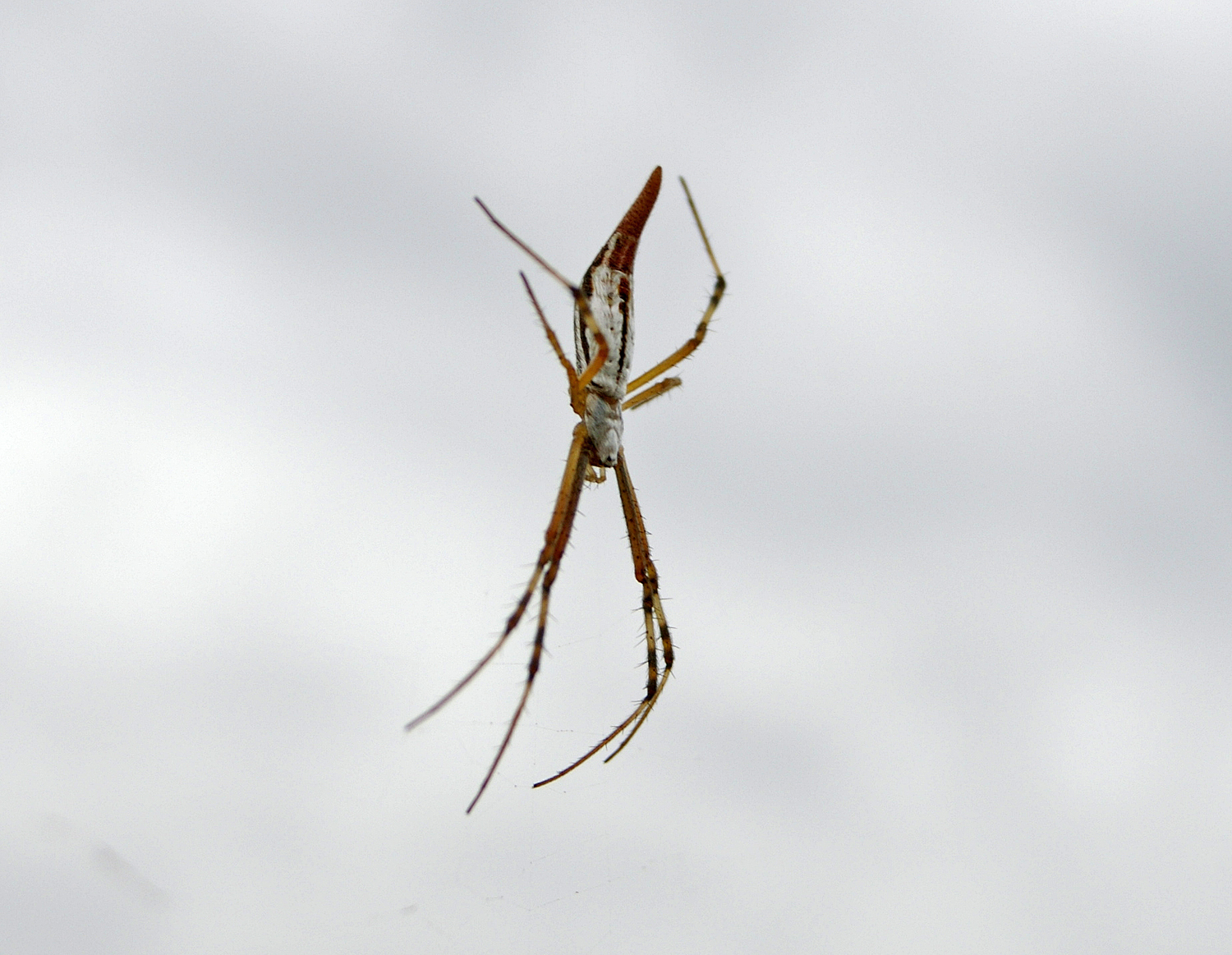

Scientific classification
- Kingdom: Animalia
- Phylum: Arthropoda
- Subphylum: Chelicerata
- Class: Arachnida
- Order: Araneae
- Infraorder: Araneomorphae
- Family: Araneidae
- Genus: Argiope
- Species: A. protensa

Binomial name
- Argiope protensa L. Koch, 1872

= Argiope protensa =

Species of spider

Argiope protensa, commonly known as the tailed grass spider or teardrop spider, is a species of spider in the orb weaver family, Araneidae. This species is fairly common and widespread in Australasia, but like many spider species, little is known of its ecology, biology, or life history.

== Description ==
Argiope protensa is a slender, medium-sized spider, reaching a body length of 13 – 25 mm. Its abdomen is distinctively elongate, tapering to a long “tail” extending beyond the ventrally-positioned spinnerets — though immature and/or male specimens may not clearly show this characteristic. The dorsal abdomen has on each side a finely pubescent strip of short, silvery hairs, which become sparse closer to the apex. Four to six pairs of weakly indented spots border the variably-coloured, hairless medial line; similar hairless dark strips run along the sides of the abdomen. Ventrally, the abdomen is dark and sparsely-haired; two pale stripes run longitudinally down its entire length to the apex. The cephalothorax makes up about a quarter of the body length, and is covered in silvery-grey hairs on its dorsal surface. Colouration of the legs can vary between individuals; some are almost uniformly grey-brown, while others have strongly contrasting bands of dark and light colour along their lengths. In descending order, the relative leg lengths are 1, 2, 4, 3. In Australia, Argiope protensa can be distinguished from A. probata (the only other Argiope species with a similarly-shaped abdomen) by examining morphological characteristics of the epigyne.

The tailed grass spider's web is variable, usually quite small (especially compared to those of other Argiope species), and may be constructed close to the ground and oriented on a plane anywhere between vertical and horizontal. A 2022 analysis of 262 photographs showing 124 different tailed grass spider webs across Australia and New Zealand showed 38.7% contained a structure known as a stabilimentum, the purpose of which is yet to be determined.

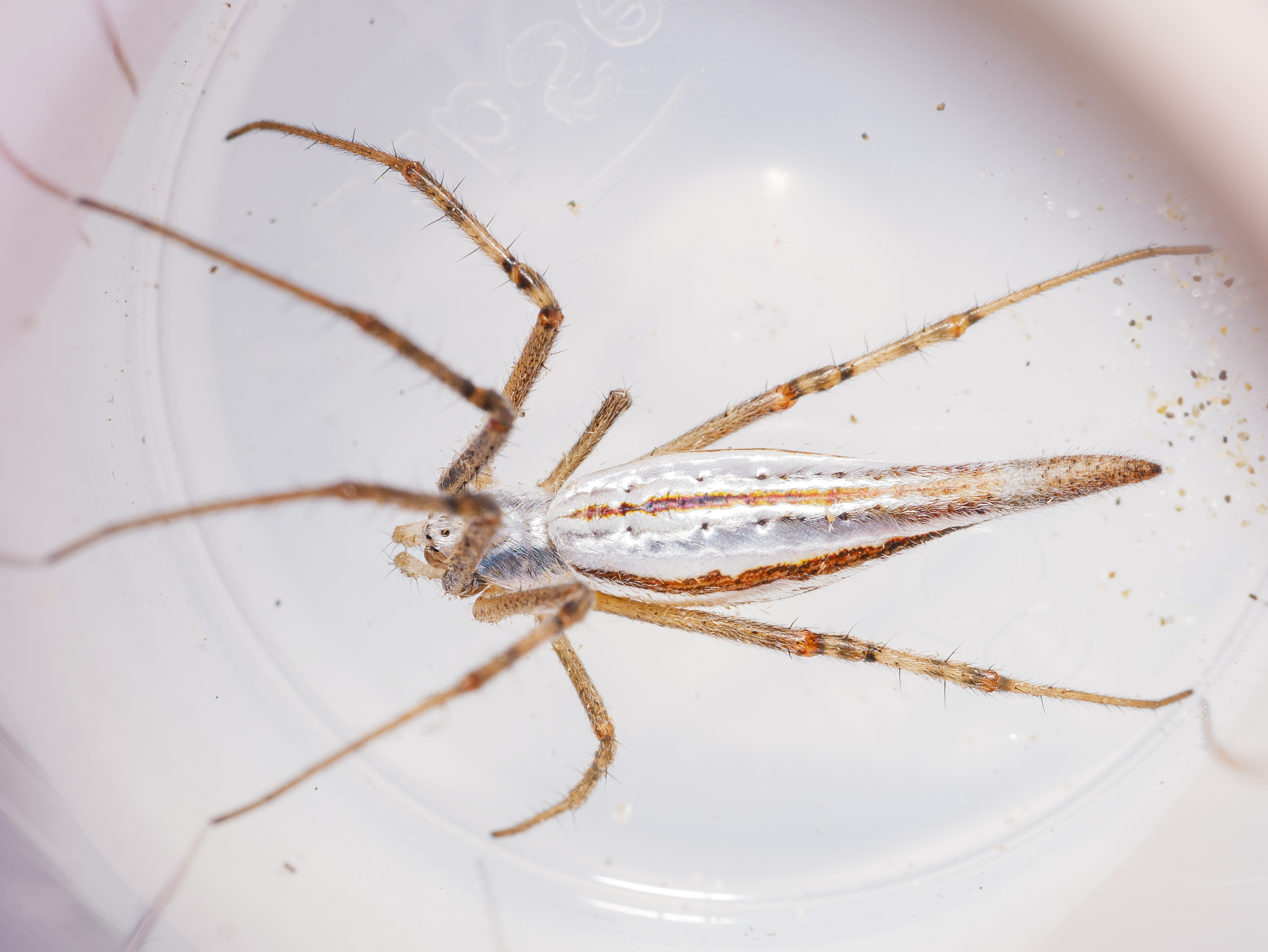
Adult female Argiope protensa dorsal view

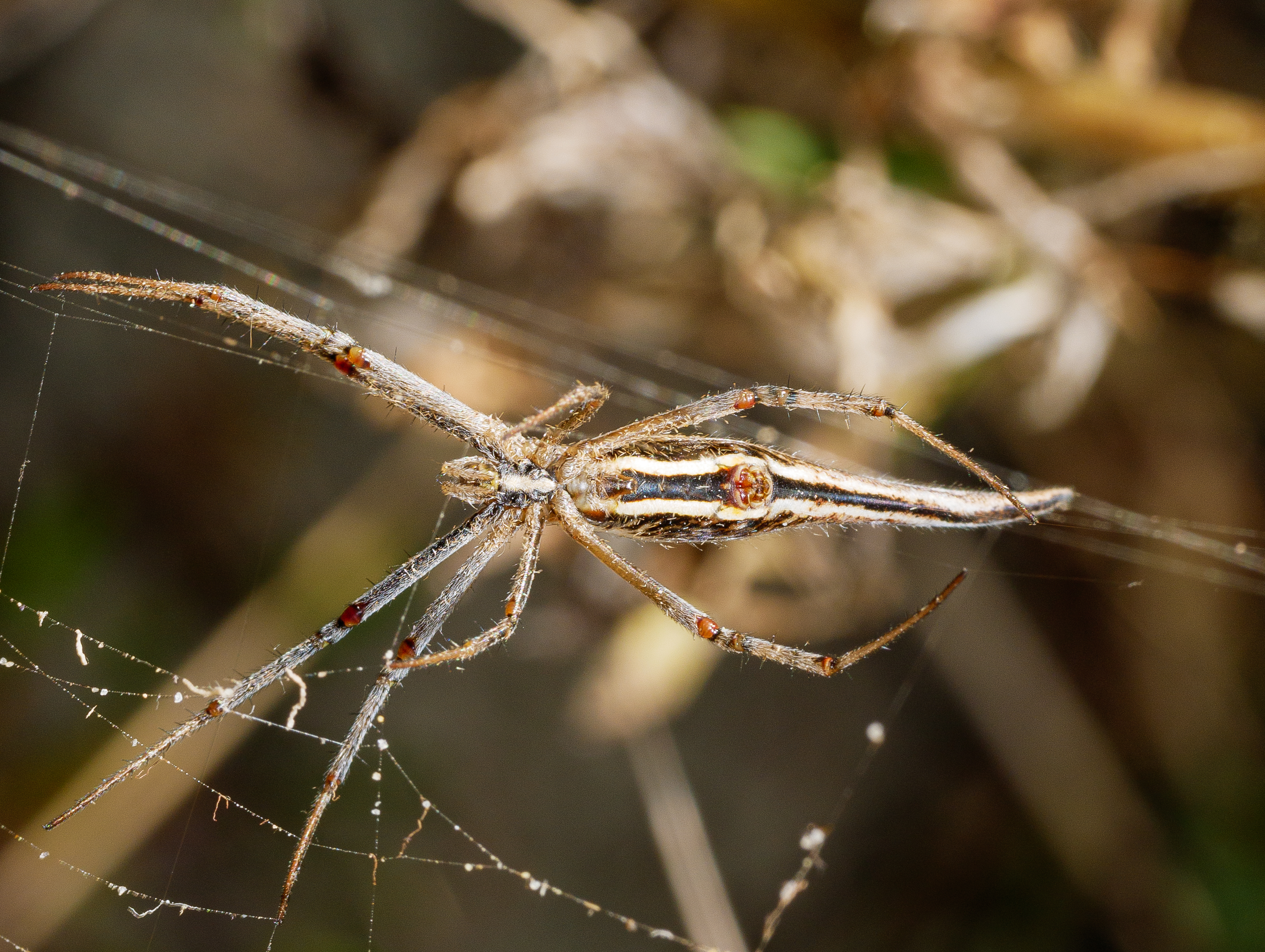
Adult female ventral view

== Distribution ==
Argiope protensa is recorded from Australia, New Zealand, New Caledonia and New Guinea. It is considered native to New Zealand, believed to have arrived from Australia by natural means; scrutiny of early collection records and/or comparative genetic analysis would be required to confirm this and estimate a time of first arrival. A 2014 study analysed changes in spider assemblage composition of Australian grasslands across a 900 km environmental gradient, and found a strong positive relationship between A. protensa and taller vegetation with high intra-tussock density.

== Life cycle ==
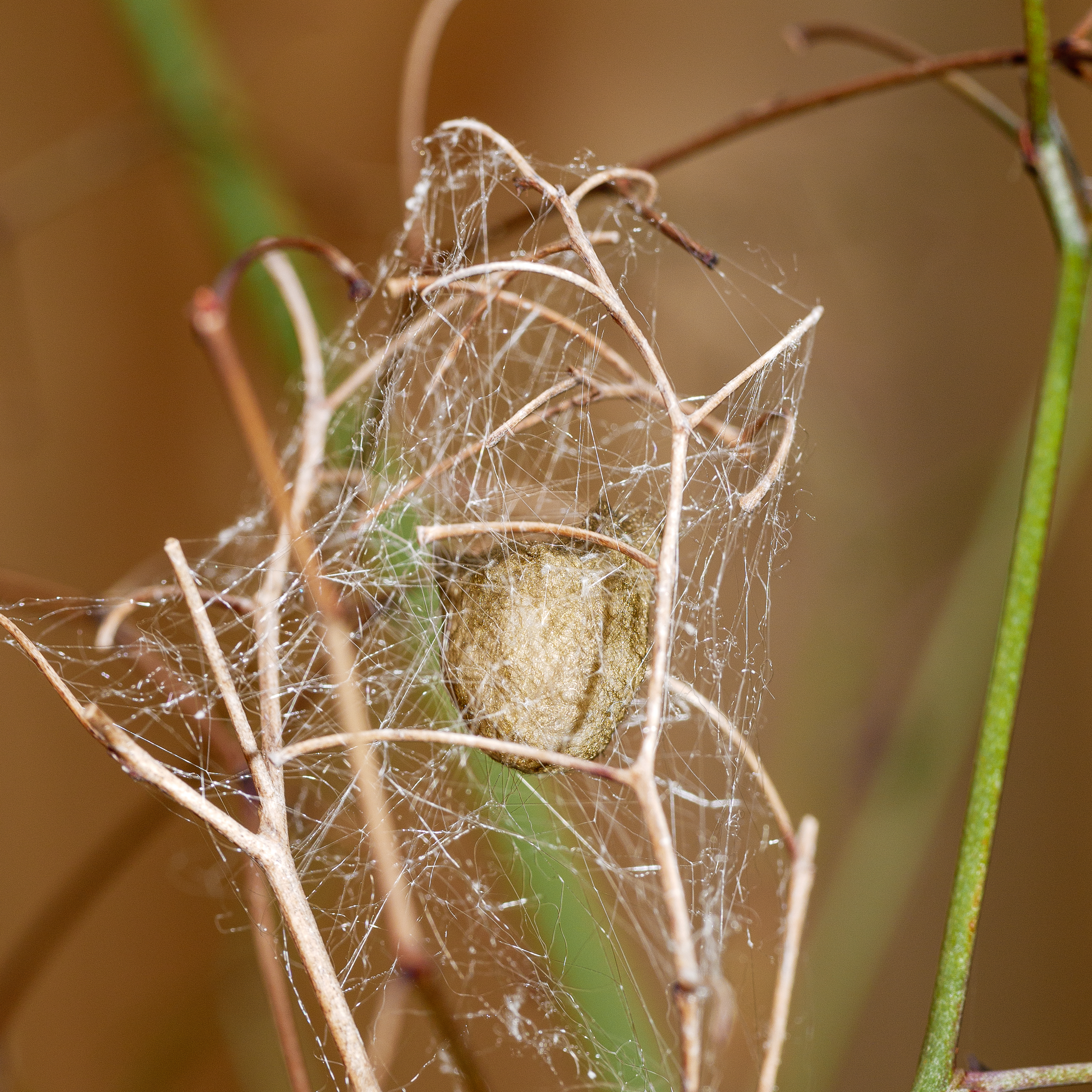
Egg mass of A. protensa

The length of the tailed grass spider’s life cycle is unknown but, like similar species, probably lasts no more than two years. Females reach maturity in midsummer, and produce cup-shaped egg masses in the late summer. It is unknown when the young hatch from their eggs. Ballooning is probably an important mechanism by which the young disperse to new habitats, and is likely how this species reached New Zealand from Australia.

== Interactions ==
As an orb-weaving spider, Argiope protensa is a generalist predator and will consume any invertebrates it can capture and subdue, though some preferential selection of prey may occur, as seen in other araneid spiders. Prey is usually restrained by wrapping with broad swathes of dense silk, which is a common behaviour in other species in this genus.

== Further information ==
Argiope protensa was first described from Australia by L. Koch in 1872; in 1885 it was also described as Epeira attenuata by Urquhart from specimens collected in New Zealand. Several other synonyms exist from different collection locations. Taxonomic confusion continued until 1971, when Chrysanthus confirmed that specimens collected from New Guinea matched Koch’s original description; in 1983 Levi agreed that similarities in genital morphology suggested many of the previously-described Australasian species were synonyms. In 2017, phylogenetic analysis by Wheeler et al. confirmed the placement of Argiope within the family Araneidae.

== Gallery ==
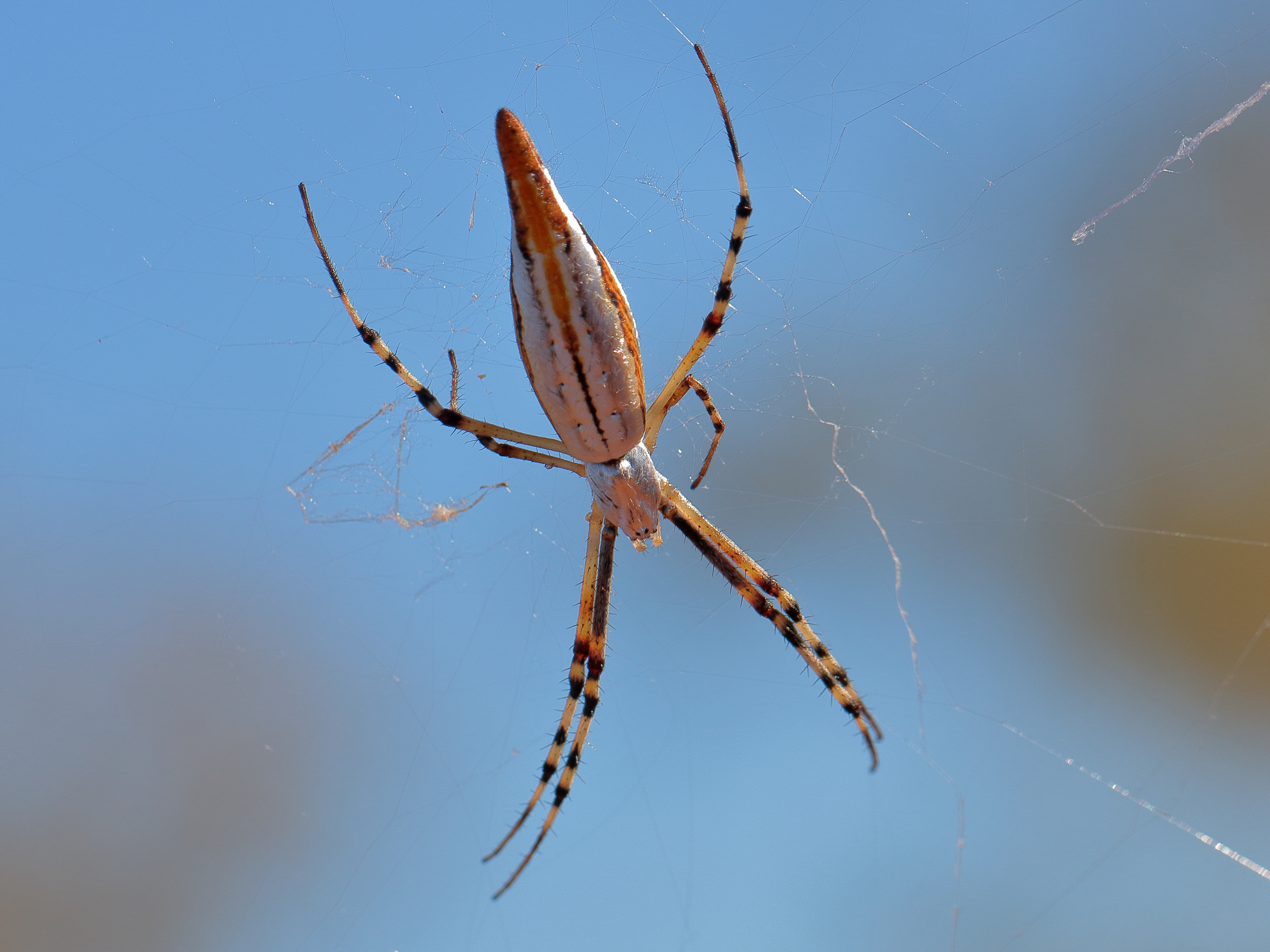
Argiope protensa dorsal view

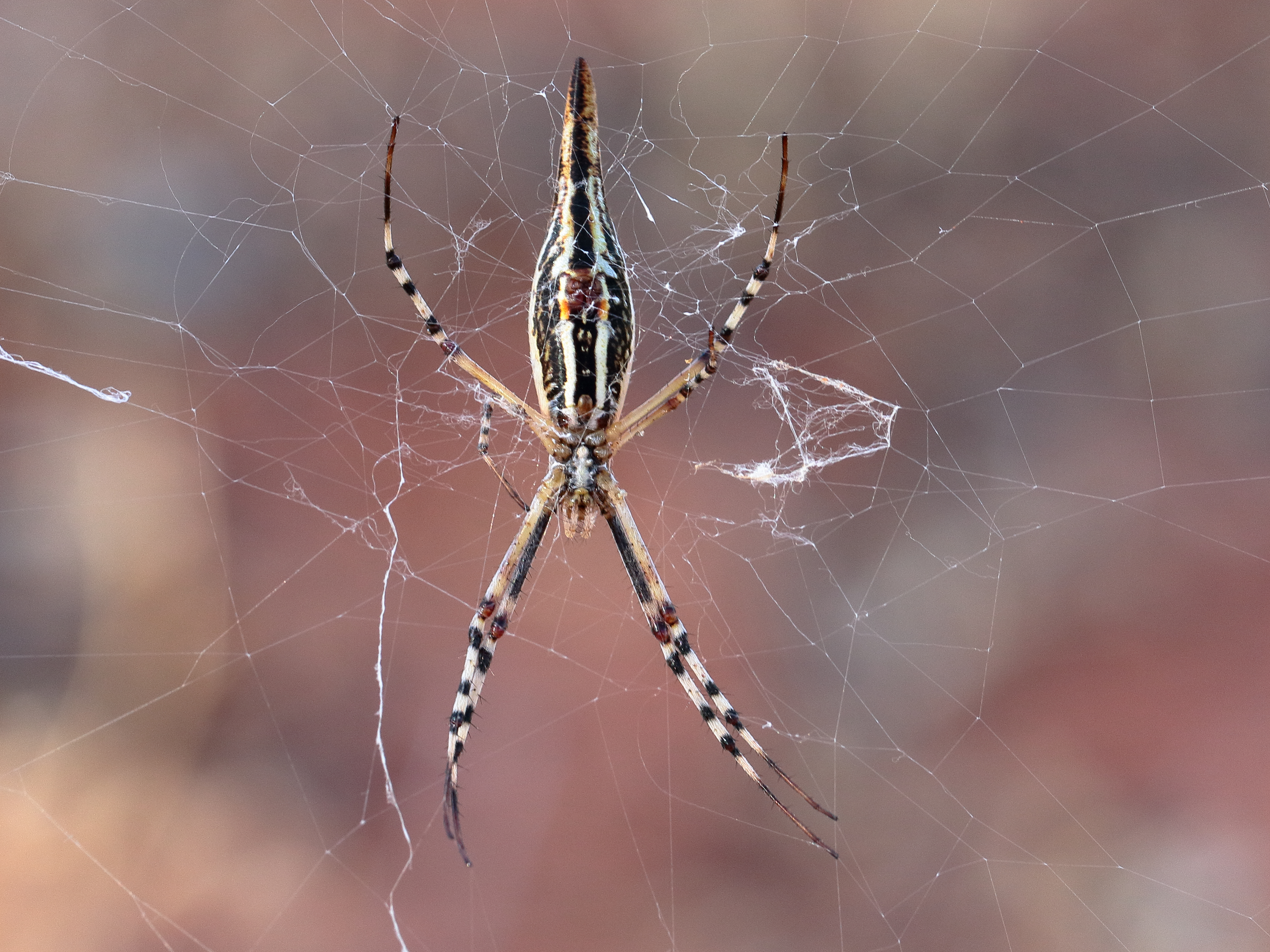
Ventral view — note strong bands of colour on legs

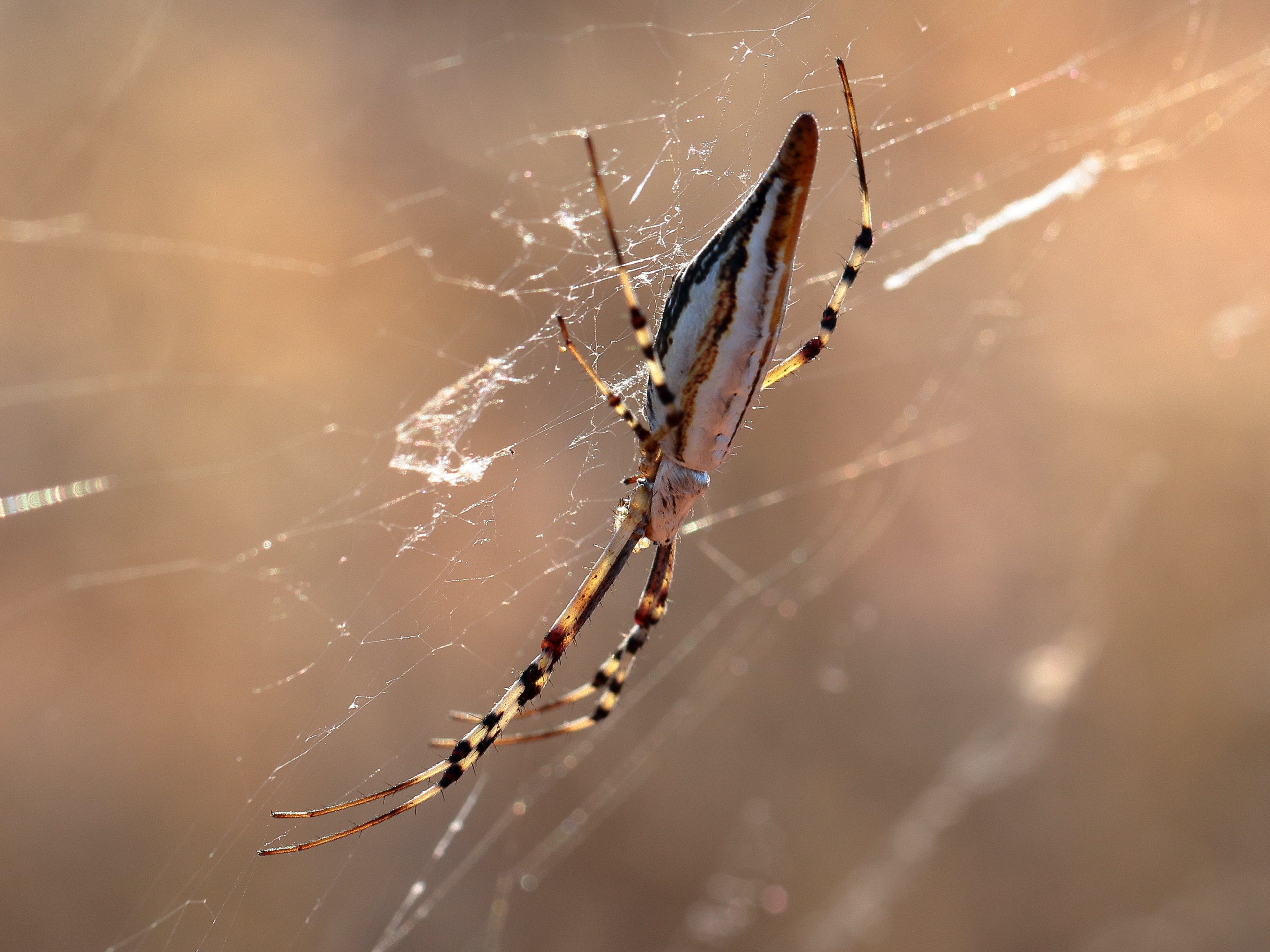
Side view

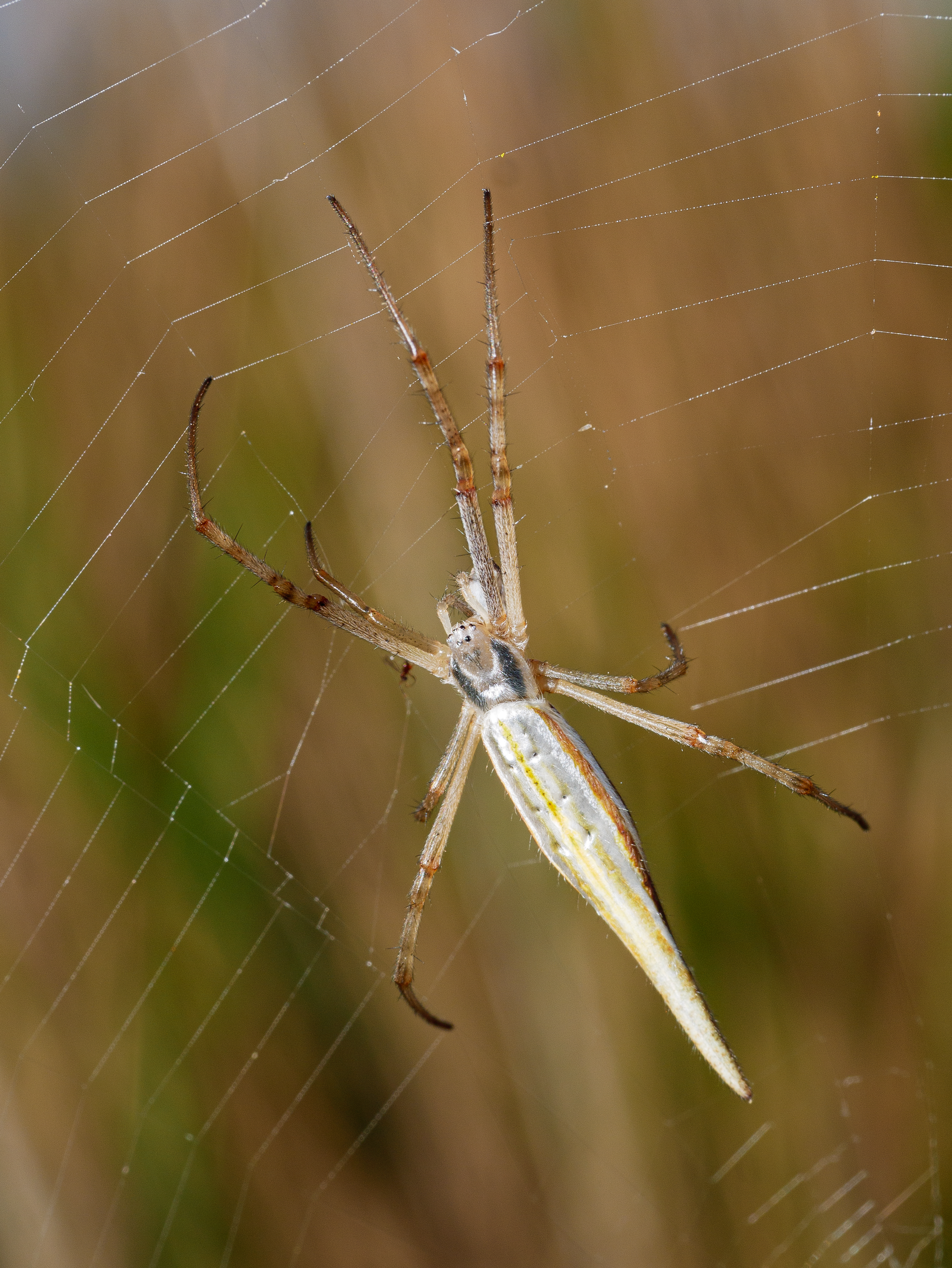
Subadult female — note yellow medial line
