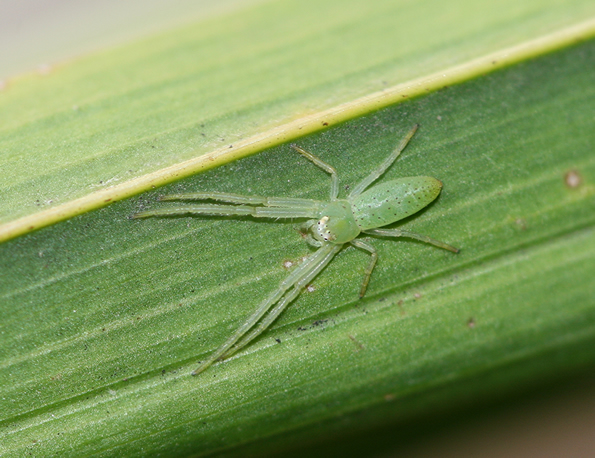

Scientific classification
- Kingdom: Animalia
- Phylum: Arthropoda
- Subphylum: Chelicerata
- Class: Arachnida
- Order: Araneae
- Infraorder: Araneomorphae
- Family: Thomisidae
- Genus: Hedana; L. Koch, 1874

Type species
- H. gracilis L. Koch, 1874

Species
- 10, see text

= Hedana =

Genus of spiders

Hedana is a genus of crab spiders that was first described by Ludwig Carl Christian Koch in 1874.

== Species ==
As of September 2020 it contains ten widely distributed species:

- Hedana bonneti Chrysanthus, 1964 – New Guinea
- Hedana gracilis L. Koch, 1874 (type) – Australia (New South Wales)
- Hedana maculosa Hogg, 1896 – Central Australia
- Hedana morgani (Simon, 1885) – Malaysia
- Hedana ocellata Thorell, 1890 – Sri Lanka, Myanmar, Indonesia (Sumatra, Java)
- Hedana octoperlata Simon, 1895 – Venezuela
- Hedana pallida L. Koch, 1876 – Tonga
- Hedana perspicax Thorell, 1890 – Myanmar, Indonesia (Sumatra, Java)
- Hedana subtilis L. Koch, 1874 – Tonga
- Hedana valida L. Koch, 1875 – Australia

== See also ==
- List of Thomisidae species
