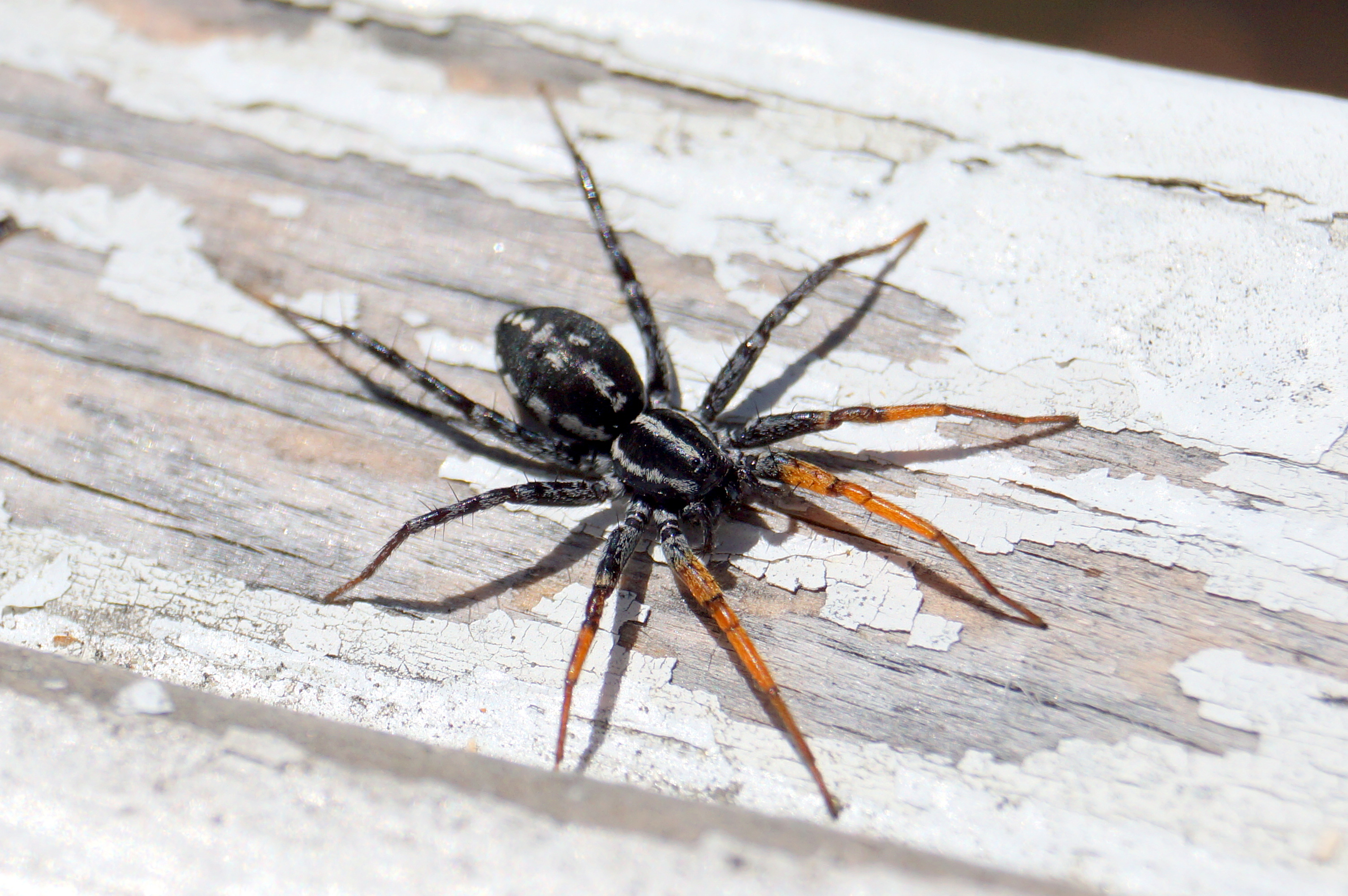

Scientific classification
- Kingdom: Animalia
- Phylum: Arthropoda
- Subphylum: Chelicerata
- Class: Arachnida
- Order: Araneae
- Infraorder: Araneomorphae
- Family: Corinnidae
- Genus: Nyssus
- Species: N. coloripes

Binomial name
- Nyssus coloripes (Walckenaer, 1805)

Synonyms
- Supunna picta; Storena auripes

= Nyssus coloripes =

Species of spider

Nyssus coloripes, known commonly in Australia as the orange-legged swift spider, but also as the spotted ground swift spider, the fleet footed spider and the painted swift spider, is a spider belonging to the family Corinnidae. It is found commonly in Australia and New Zealand.

== Taxonomy ==
This species was described in 1805 by Charles Walckenaer. It was most recently revised in 2015.

== Description ==
Orange-legged swift spiders are mostly black in appearance, with white spots along most of the body and orange front legs. They are typically 6–7 mm in length.

== Distribution and habitat ==
The orange-legged swift spider is native to Australia. It was introduced to New Zealand around 1943 and is fully naturalised.

In New Zealand, it is commonly found inside homes and in short grassland.

== Behaviour ==
Orange-legged swift spiders are diurnal. They often hunt prey without the use of webs, though they may use their webs to detect prey.

== Gallery ==
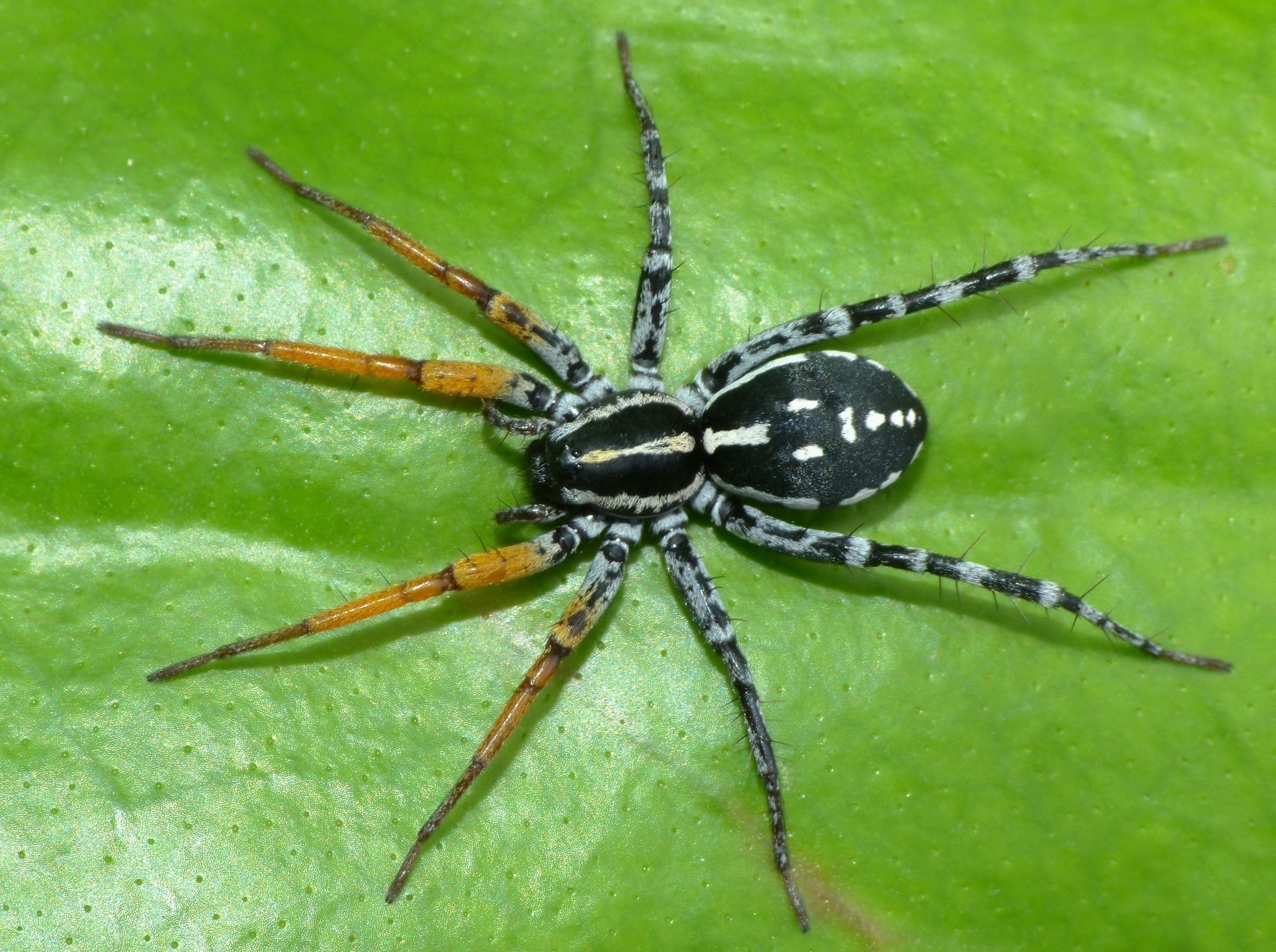

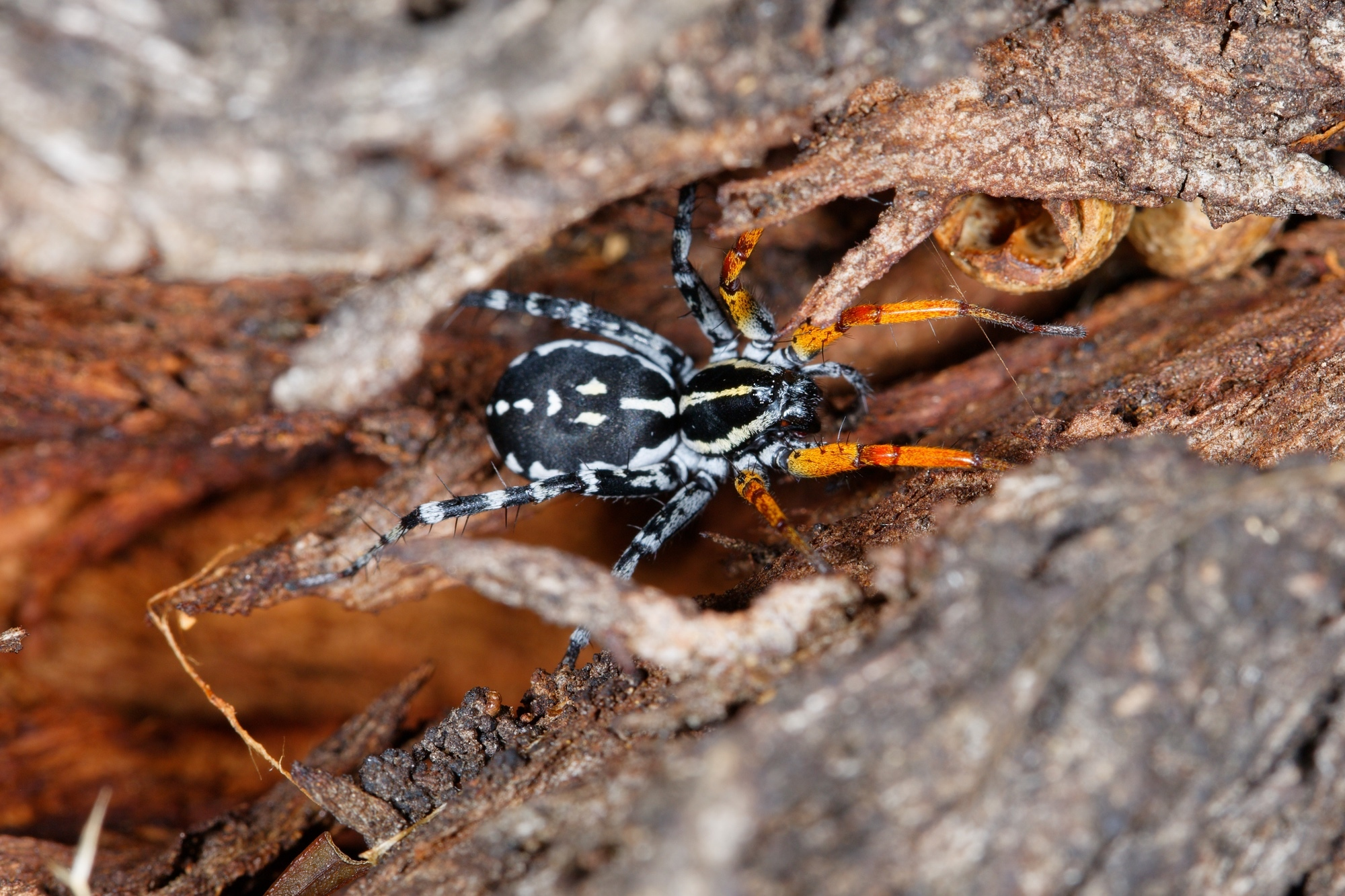

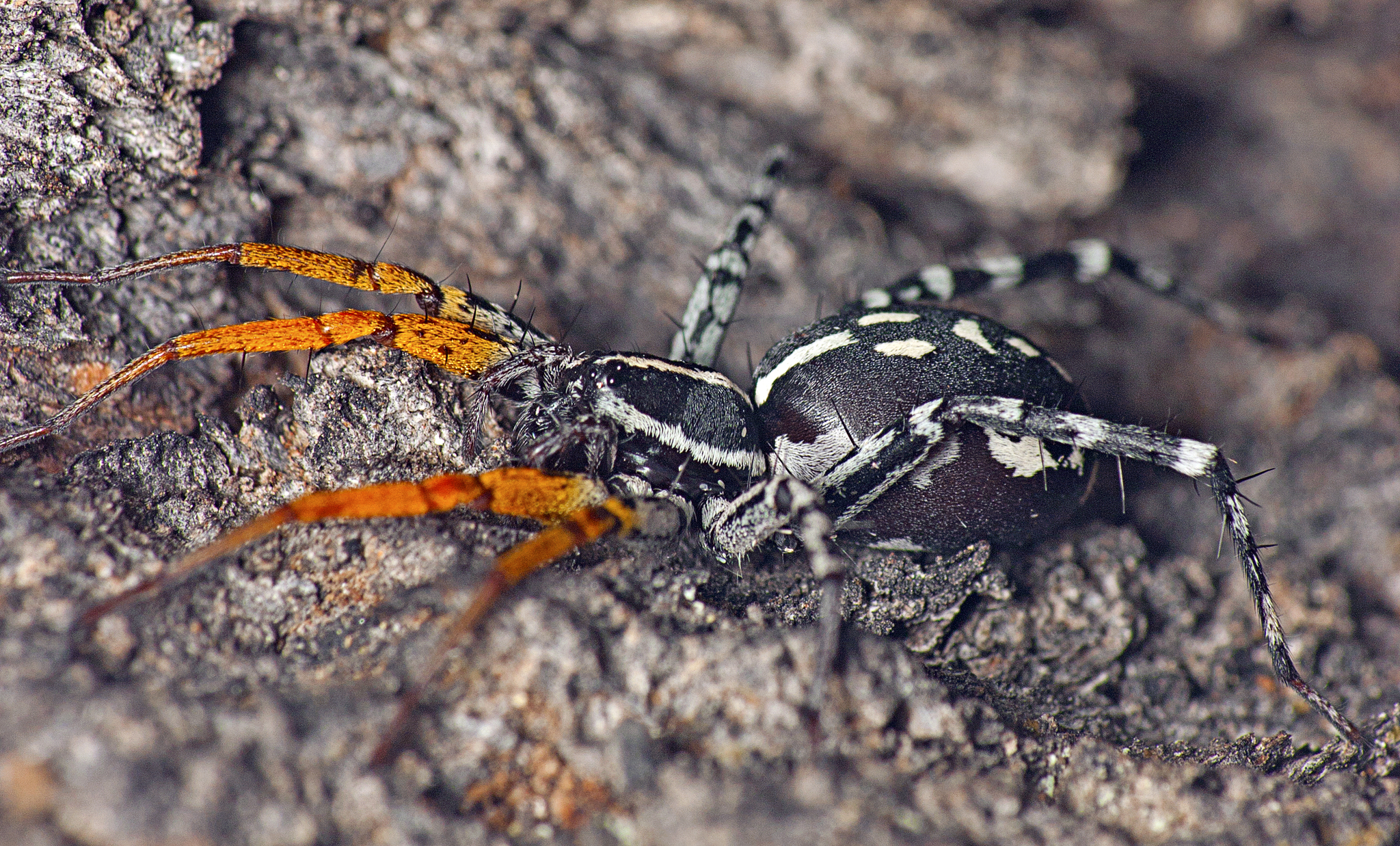

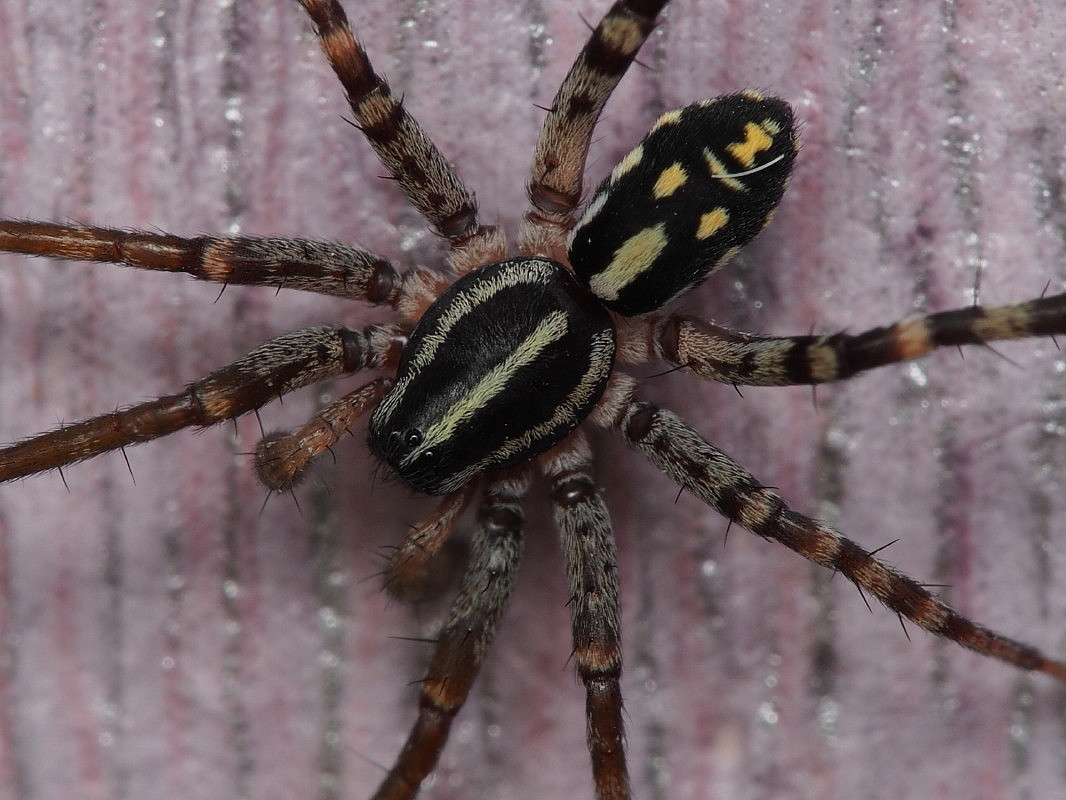
