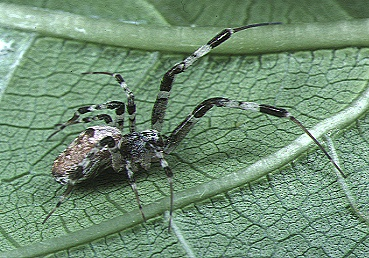
- Female
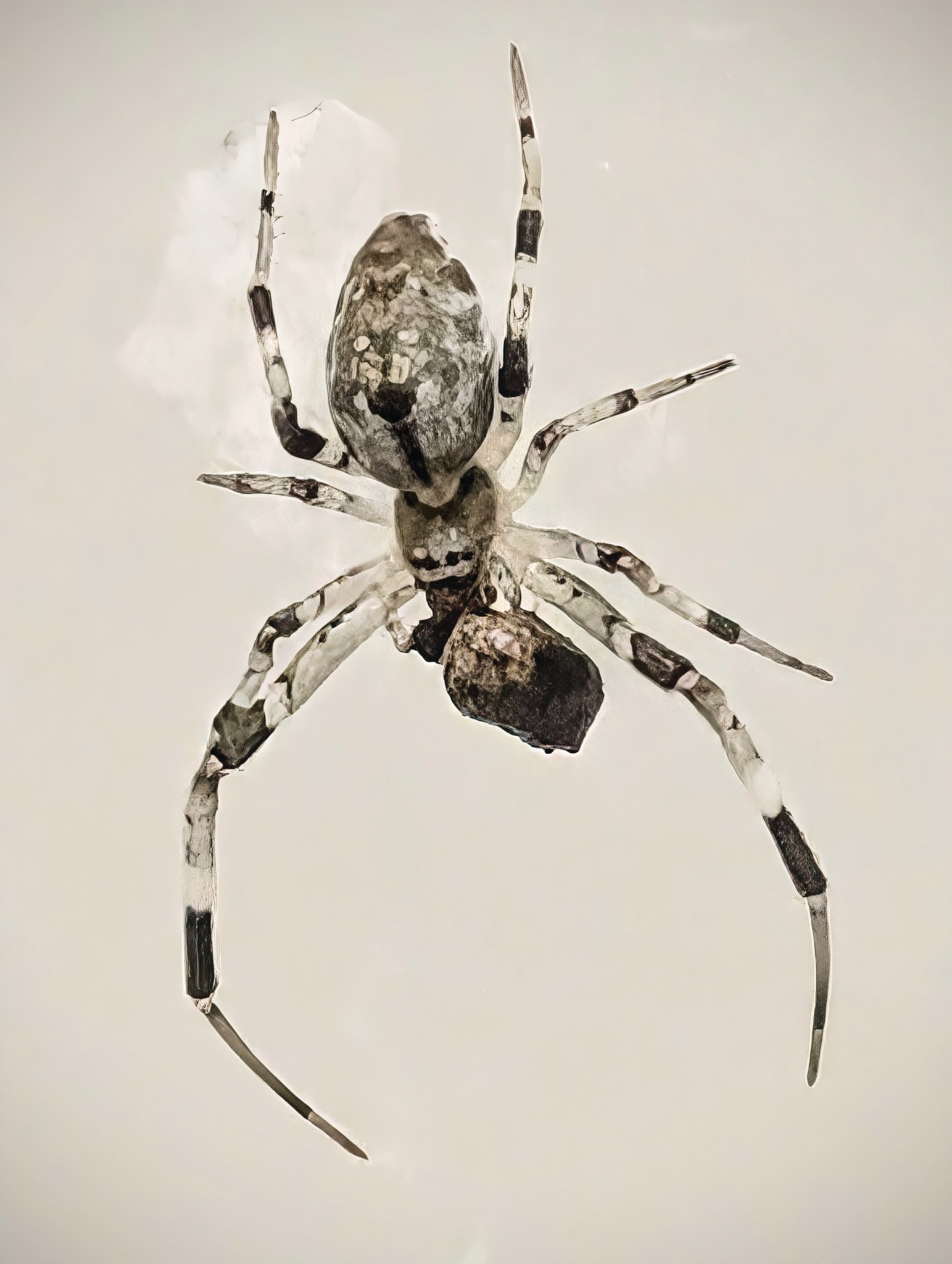

Scientific classification
- Kingdom: Animalia
- Phylum: Arthropoda
- Subphylum: Chelicerata
- Class: Arachnida
- Order: Araneae
- Infraorder: Araneomorphae
- Family: Uloboridae
- Genus: Zosis
- Species: Z. geniculata

Binomial name
- Zosis geniculata (Olivier, 1789)

Synonyms
- Aranea geniculata Olivier, 1789; Uloborus zosis Walckenaer, 1841; Zosis caraibe Walckenaer, 1841; Orithya williamsii Blackwall, 1858; Uloborus latreilleii Thorell, 1858; Uloborus domesticus Doleschall, 1859; Uloborus borbonicus Vinson, 1863; Orithya luteolus Blackwall, 1865; Zosis caraiba (Walckenaer, 1841); Uloborus spinitarsis Keyserling, 1887; Uloborus geniculatus (Olivier, 1789); Uloborus luteolus (Blackwall, 1865); Philoponella xiamenensis Xie et al., 1997

= Zosis geniculata =

Humped spider

Species of spider

Zosis geniculata is a cosmopolitan species of spider with a pantropical distribution. In Australia, it is often seen in buildings near human habitation.

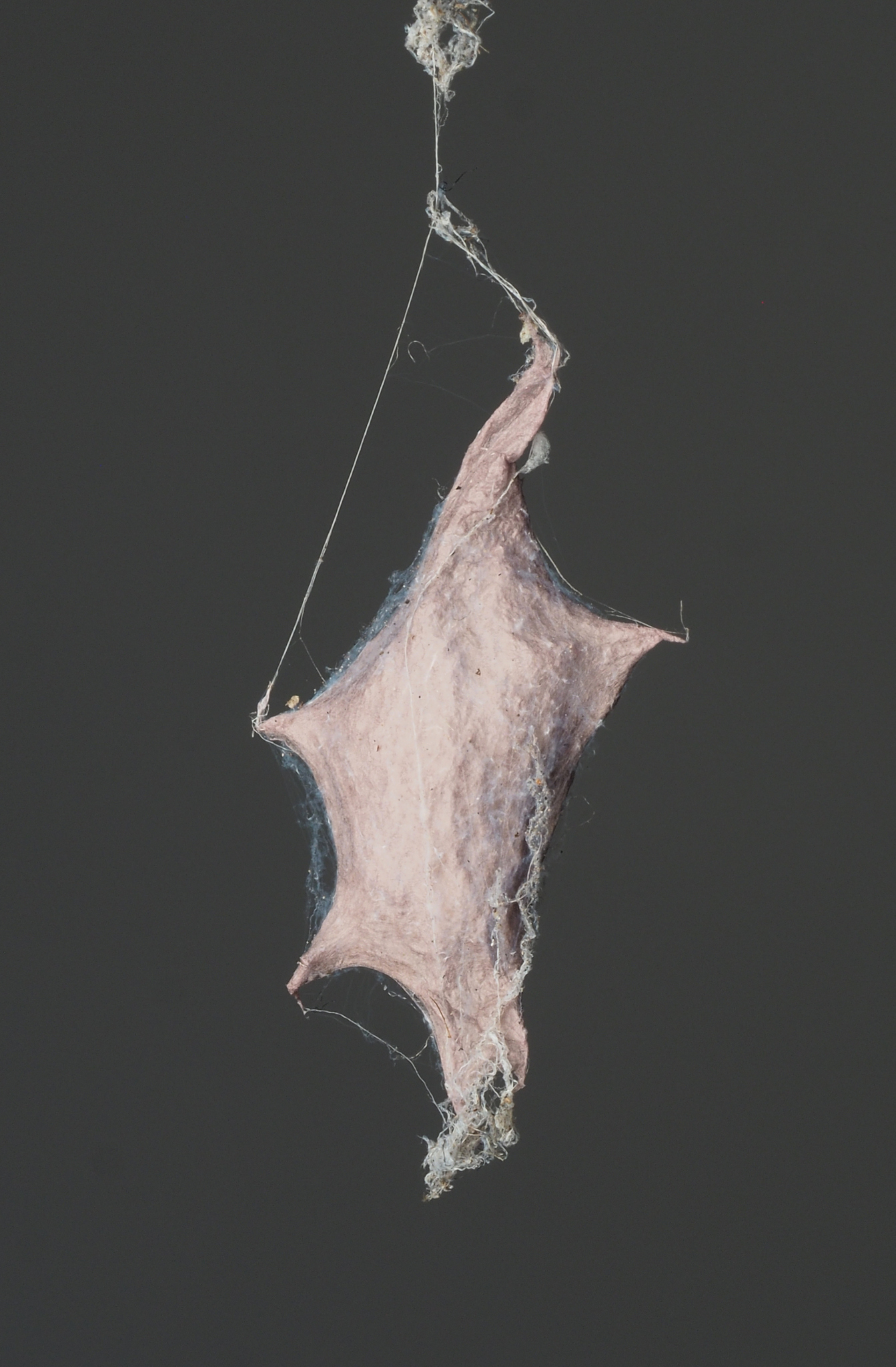
egg sac
