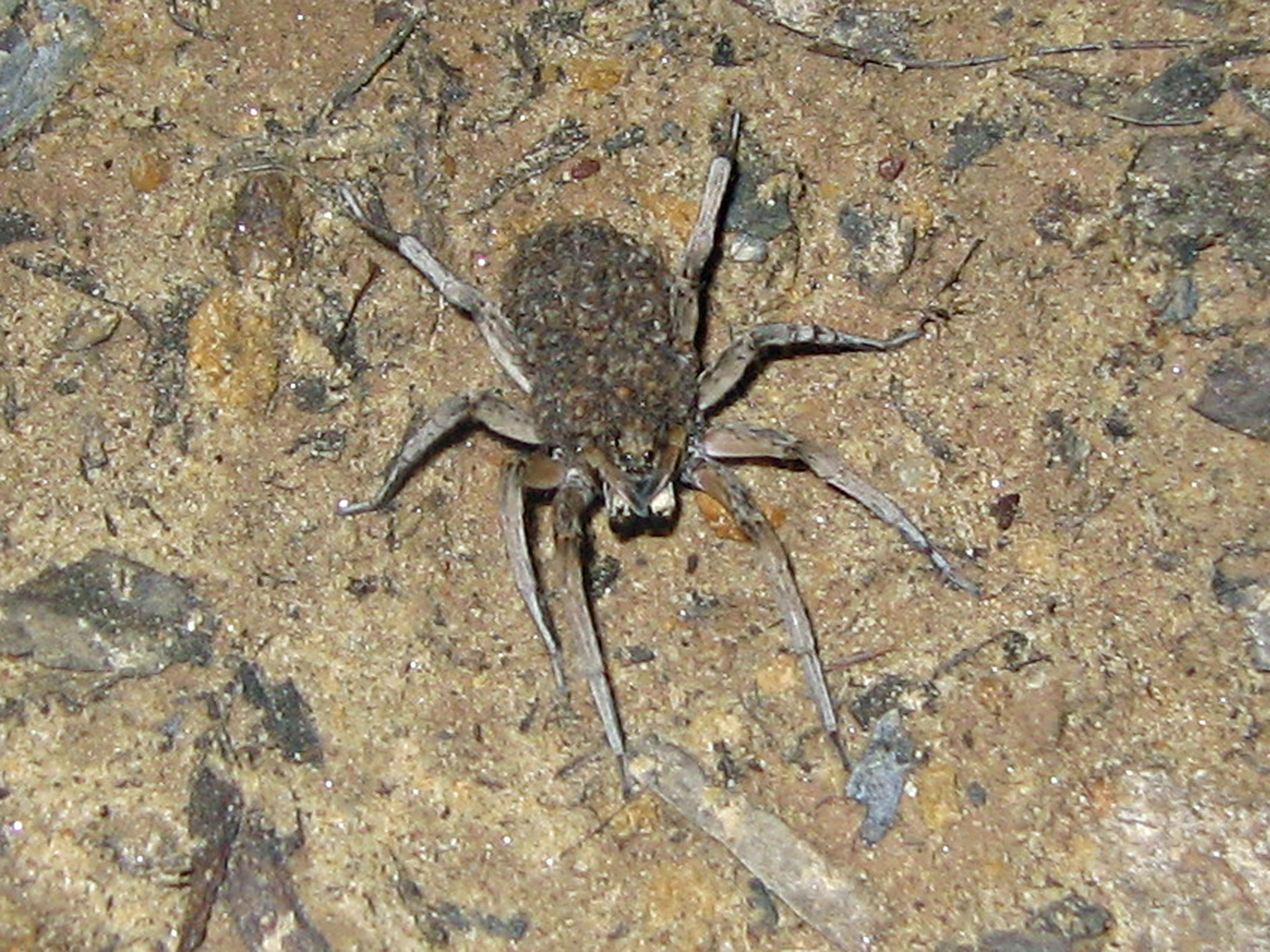

Scientific classification
- Kingdom: Animalia
- Phylum: Arthropoda
- Subphylum: Chelicerata
- Class: Arachnida
- Order: Araneae
- Infraorder: Araneomorphae
- Family: Lycosidae
- Genus: Venatrix
- Species: V. furcillata

Binomial name
- Venatrix furcillata L.Koch, 1867

Synonyms
- Lycosa furcillata L. Koch, 1867: 201-202.; Lycosa furcillata L. Koch.- Koch (1877a): 903-906, plate 78, Figs 1A-B, 2A-B.; Lycosa furcillata L. Koch.- Rainbow, 1911: 268.; Allocosa furcillata (L. Koch).- Roewer, 1955c: 206.; Allocosa furcillata L. Koch.- Rack, 1961: 37.; Lycosa furcillata L. Koch.- McKay, 1973: 379.; Lycosa furcillata L. Koch.- McKay, 1974a: 15-18, Figs 3C-D, K-M.; Lycosa furcillata L. Koch.- McKay, 1985b: 77.; Lycosa furcillata L. Koch.- Platnick, 1993: 487.; Venatrix furcillata (L. Koch).- Framenau & Vink, 2001: 957-959, Figs 36A-D, 37.

= Venatrix furcillata =

Little wolf spider

Species of spider

Venatrix furcillata, one of the wolf spiders, is a mid sized spider found in eastern Australia. The body length of the female is up to 13 mm, the male 9 mm. The abdomen has distinctive tapering markings. Sometimes noted in suburban gardens and lawns. It lives in a simple burrow, but may be seen migrating in large numbers to a communal web, an unusual feature for wolf spiders. The grey coloured spherical egg sac is around 6 mm in diameter, carried by the female. Eggs are 45 to 60 in number, 0.8 mm in diameter. Prey is ground dwelling insects. The spider has been identified as occurring in Queensland, New South Wales, and Victoria.
