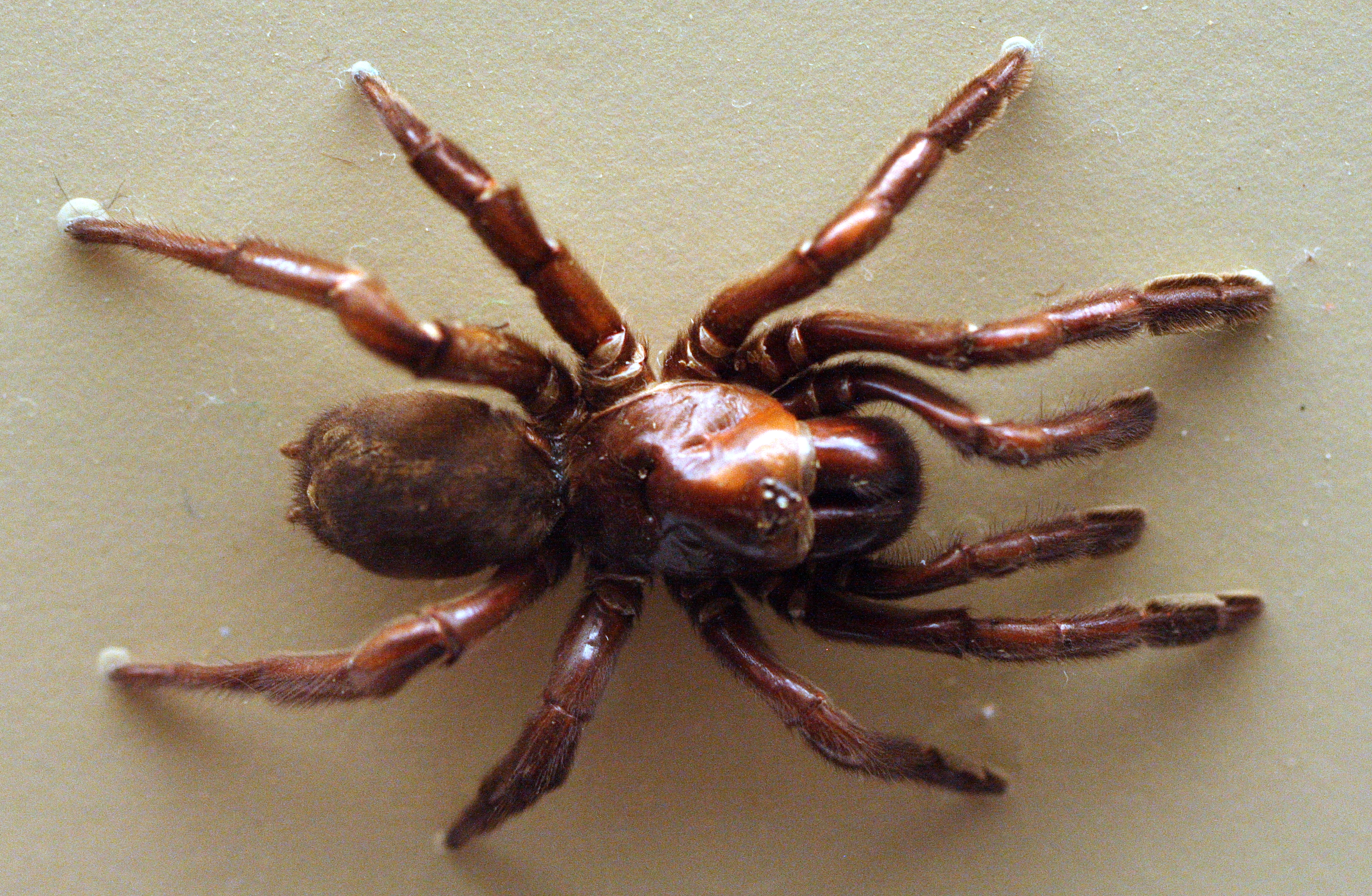
- Gaius villosus

Scientific classification
- Domain: Eukaryota
- Kingdom: Animalia
- Phylum: Arthropoda
- Subphylum: Chelicerata
- Class: Arachnida
- Order: Araneae
- Infraorder: Mygalomorphae
- Family: Idiopidae
- Genus: Gaius; Rainbow, 1914
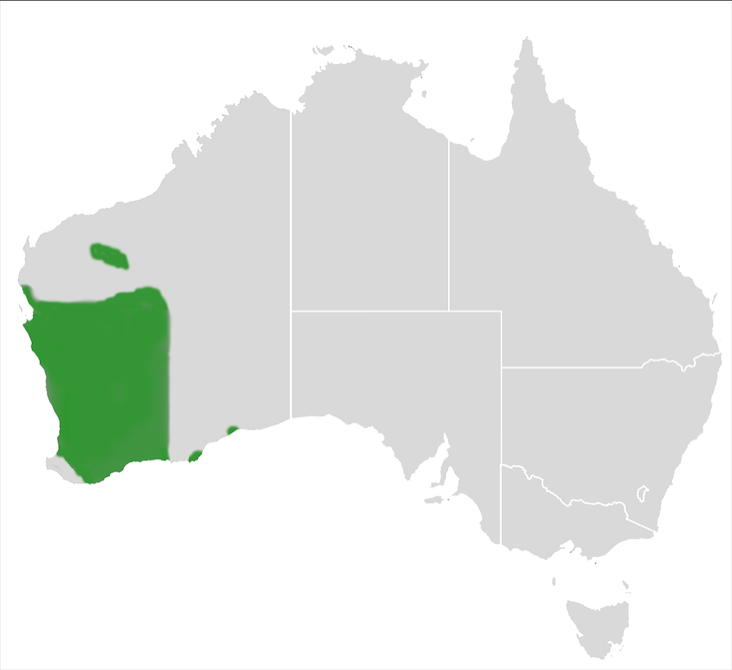
- Distribution of Gaius species

= Gaius (spider) =

Genus of spiders

Gaius is a genus of large mygalomorph spiders in the family Idiopidae. Erected in 1914 by William Joseph Rainbow, for much of its history the genus contained only one species, Gaius villosus. More species were added in 2018. All are endemic to Western Australia.

== Description ==
Species of Gaius are large spiders, usually dark brown or black. Females have a body length of around 30–40 mm (1.2–1.6 in), males around 20–35 mm (0.8–1.4 in). The carapace has a dense fringe of hairs (setae) along the sides. The abdomen is oval, densely covered with hairs. Males have pedipalps with a retrolateral tibial apophysis (RTA), which in most species is large and long. Females have a pair of simple, widely spaced spermathecae.

== Taxonomy ==
The genus Gaius was erected by William Joseph Rainbow in 1914 for his new species Gaius villosus. In 1957, Barbara York Main transferred G. villosus (then still the only species of Gaius) to the genus Anidiops, noting the inadequacy of many characters used in mygalomorph taxonomy. Main placed the species in the tribe Aganippini, within the family Ctenizidae (as then circumscribed). (Rainbow had used the same placement, although with different ranks.) By 2017, the Ctenizidae had been split, and the tribe Aganippini was placed in the subfamily Arbanitinae of the family Idiopidae. A major study of the Arbanitinae, including molecular phylogenetic evidence, concluded that Gaius was a distinct genus, although all the other species of Anidiops were placed in the genus Idiosoma. Gaius remained a monotypic genus until 2018, when a further seven species were added.

=== Phylogeny ===
Within the tribe Aganippini, Gaius is sister to the genus Eucyrtops:

- Subfamily Arbanitinae
  - Tribe Euoplini (Euoplos)
  - - - Tribe Cataxiini (Cataxia)
      - Tribe Arbanitini (Cantuaria, Blakistonia, Arbanitis)
    - Tribe Aganippini
      - Bungulla
      - - - Gaius
          - Eucyrtops
        - - Eucanippe
          - Idiosoma

=== Species ===
As of April 2019, the World Spider Catalog accepted the following species, all from Western Australia:

- Gaius aurora Rix, Raven & Harvey, 2018
- Gaius austini Rix, Raven & Harvey, 2018
- Gaius cooperi Rix, Raven & Harvey, 2018
- Gaius hueyi Rix, Raven & Harvey, 2018
- Gaius humphreysi Rix, Raven & Harvey, 2018
- Gaius mainae Rix, Raven & Harvey, 2018
- Gaius tealei Rix, Raven & Harvey, 2018
- Gaius villosus Rainbow, 1914 (type species)

== Distribution and habitat ==
Gaius species are found in a broad region in the south-west of Western Australia. They are most common in mallee woodlands, Acacia (mulga) woodlands and shrublands, and spinifex (Triodia) plains, where the soil is clay or hard loam. They construct deep burrows with a flap- or wafer-like door.
