= Porongurup =

Porongurup may refer to:

- Porongurup, Western Australia, a locality in the Shire of Plantagenet
  - Porongurup National Park, located in the above locality, in the Porongurup Range
- Porongurup Tourist Drive, one of the Tourist Drives in Western Australia
- Acacia leioderma, commonly known as the Porongurup wattle
- Cataxia bolganupensis, known as the Porongurup trapdoor spider
- Hibbertia porongurupensis, rare Hibbertia identified as being located in the Porongurup Range
