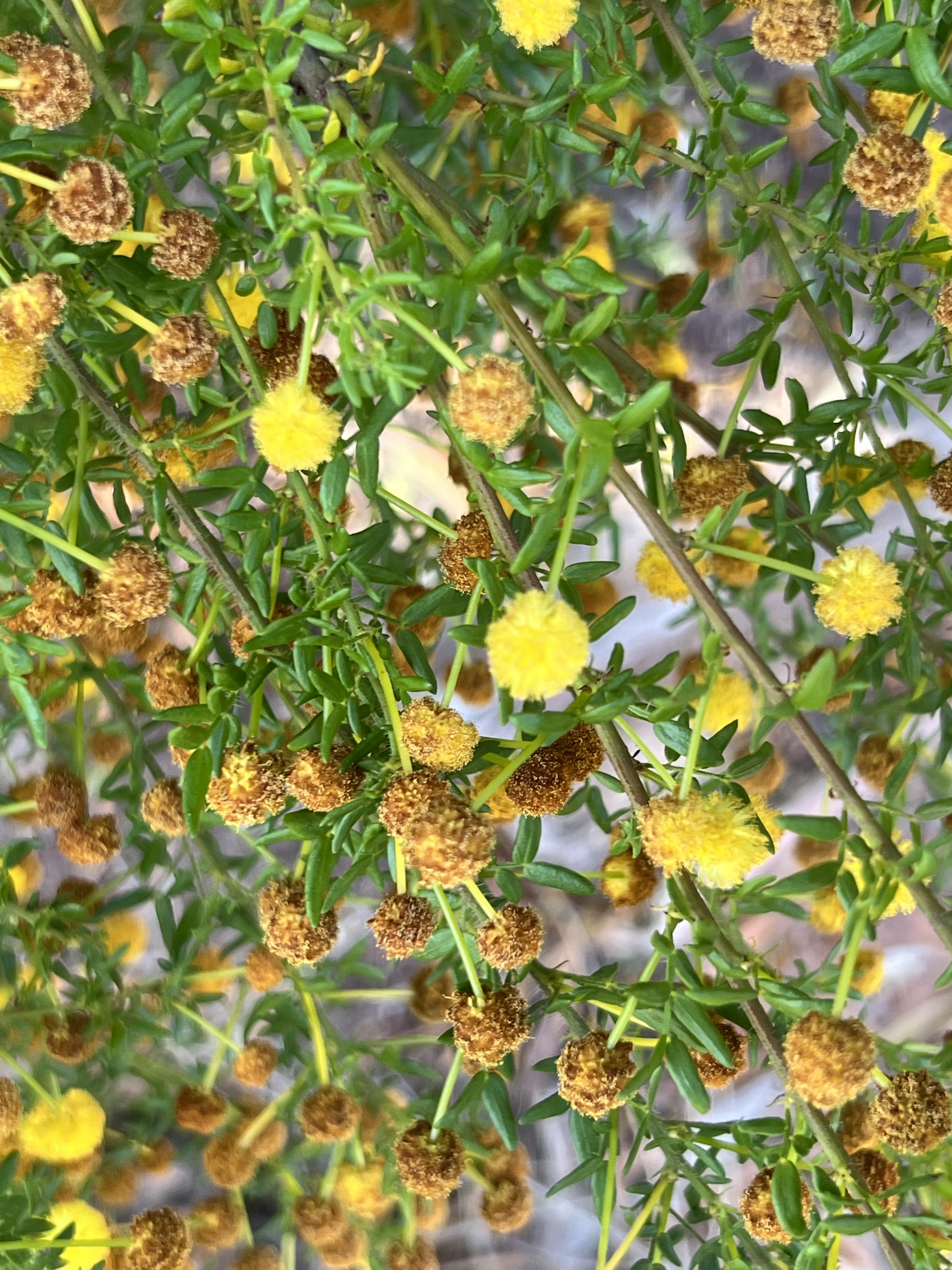

Scientific classification
- Kingdom: Plantae
- Clade: Tracheophytes
- Clade: Angiosperms
- Clade: Eudicots
- Clade: Rosids
- Order: Fabales
- Family: Fabaceae
- Subfamily: Caesalpinioideae
- Clade: Mimosoid clade
- Genus: Acacia
- Species: A. empelioclada

Binomial name
- Acacia empelioclada Maslin
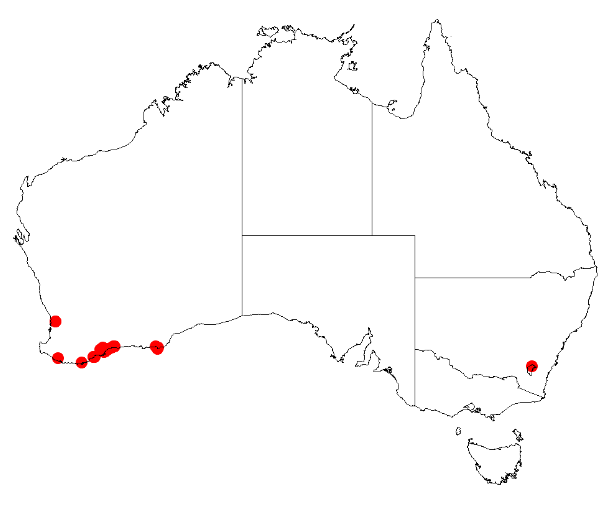
- Occurrence data from AVH

Synonyms
- Acacia obscura var. moiriana E.Pritz.; Racosperma empeliocladum (Maslin) Pedley

= Acacia empelioclada =

Species of plant

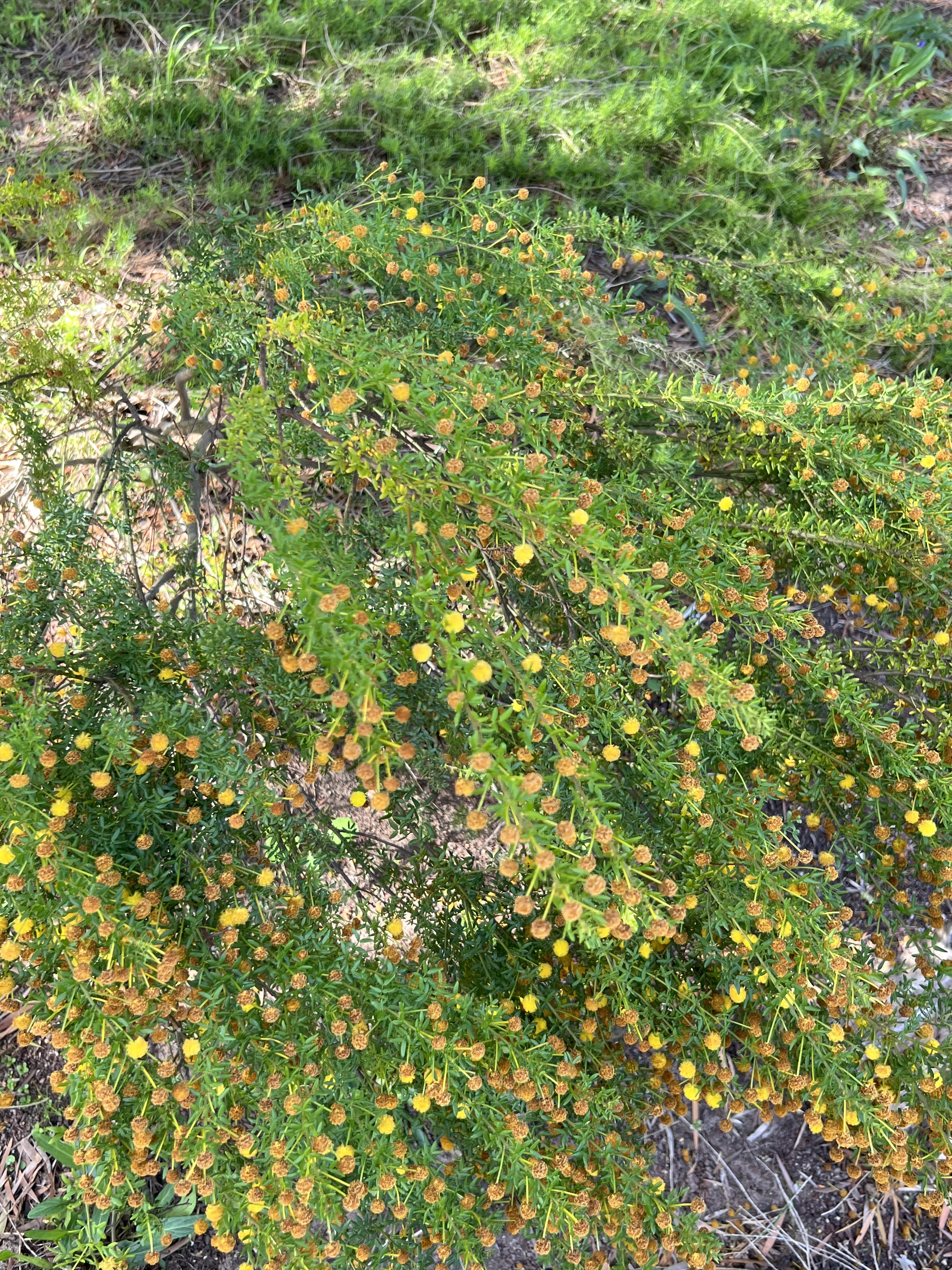
Habit

Acacia empelioclada is a species of flowering plant in the family Fabaceae and is endemic to the south of Western Australia. It is a spindly, erect shrub with ribbed, hairy branchlets, bipinnate leaves, spherical heads of cream-coloured to pale yellow flowers, and hairy or glabrous pods.

== Description ==
Acacia empelioclada is spindly, erect shrub that typically grows to a height of 0.5–2 m (1 ft 8 in – 6 ft 7 in) and has ribbed, hairy, black to grey branchlets. Its leaves are bipinnate with up to three pairs of pinnae 10–30 mm (0.39–1.18 in) long on a petiole 1–2 mm (0.039–0.079 in) long, each pinna with three to ten narrowly oblong leaflets 4–10 mm (0.16–0.39 in) long, 1–3 mm (0.039–0.118 in) wide with flat to turned down or rolled down edges. The lower leaves have pinnae 2–12 mm (0.079–0.472 in) long with fewer leaflets. The flowers are borne in spherical heads of one or two in axils on peduncles 10–20 mm (0.39–0.79 in) long, each head with 25 to 43 cream-coloured to pale yellow flowers. Flowering occurs from July to October, and the pods are 15–50 mm (0.59–1.97 in) long and 6–9 mm (0.24–0.35 in) wide, containing seeds about 3 mm (0.12 in) long.

== Taxonomy ==
Acacia empelioclada was first formally described in 1975 by Bruce Maslin from specimens he collected about 1.5 km (0.93 mi) north-west of Mount Bland, about 60 km (37 mi) south-west of Hopetoun in 1973. This species belongs to the Acacia browniana group of wattles but resembles both A. leioderma and A. lateriticola. The specific epithet (empelioclada) refers to the "blackish colour of the mature branches". "However, the branches on juvenile plants and also often the branchlets on mature shrubs are red to brown in colour".

== Distribution and habitat ==
This species of wattle grows on rocky hills in mallee heath, in sand or sandy laterite and in clay soil along watercourses in scrub, in near-coastal areas at Cape Riche and in the Fitzgerald River National Park in the Esperance Plains bioregion in southern Western Australia.

== See also ==
- List of Acacia species
