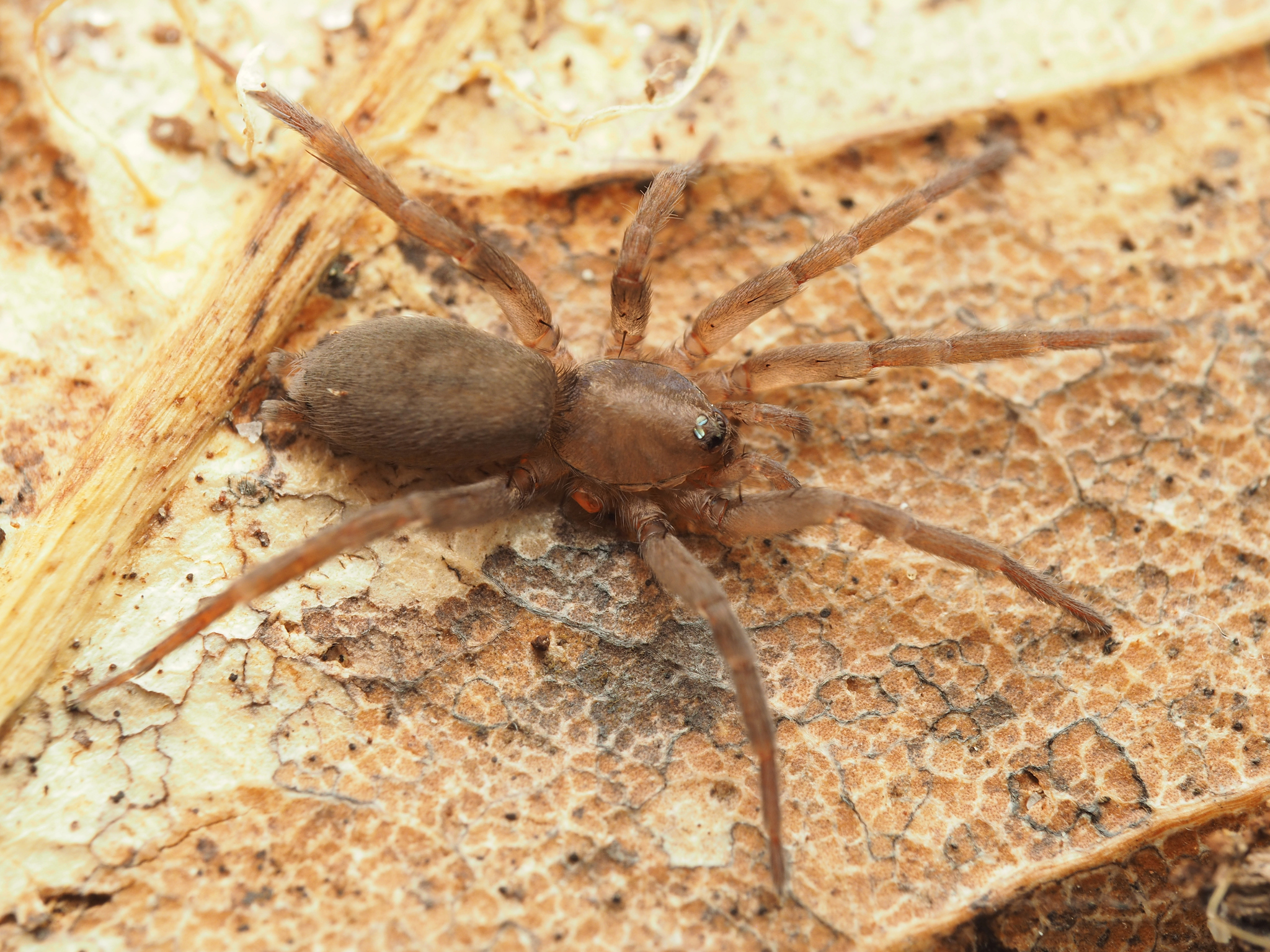
- A. yarraman

Scientific classification
- Kingdom: Animalia
- Phylum: Arthropoda
- Subphylum: Chelicerata
- Class: Arachnida
- Order: Araneae
- Infraorder: Araneomorphae
- Family: Gnaphosidae
- Genus: Avstroneulanda; Zakharov & Ovtsharenko, 2022

Type species
- A. grayi Zakharov & Ovtsharenko, 2022

Species
- 13, see text

= Avstroneulanda =

Genus of spiders

Avstroneulanda is a genus of spiders in the family Gnaphosidae.

== Distribution ==
Avstroneulanda is distributed across Australia and Papua New Guinea, with the majority of species occurring in Australia. The genus is represented in all Australian states and territories, with particularly high species diversity in Western Australia and Queensland.

A. hostosi and A. kokoda are endemic to Papua New Guinea.

== Taxonomy ==
Spiders in this genus appear to be a sister group to the genera Zelanda and Encoptarthria.

== Species ==
As of October 2025, this genus includes thirteen species:

- Avstroneulanda grayi Zakharov & Ovtsharenko, 2022 – Australia (Queensland, New South Wales, Capital Territory, Victoria) (type species)
- Avstroneulanda harveyi Zakharov & Ovtsharenko, 2022 – Australia (Western Australia)
- Avstroneulanda hostosi Zakharov & Ovtsharenko, 2022 – Papua New Guinea
- Avstroneulanda johnmurphyi Zakharov & Ovtsharenko, 2022 – Australia (Western Australia, South Australia, Queensland, New South Wales)
- Avstroneulanda joyae Zakharov & Ovtsharenko, 2022 – Australia (Western Australia)
- Avstroneulanda julianneae Zakharov & Ovtsharenko, 2022 – Australia (Western Australia)
- Avstroneulanda kokoda Zakharov & Ovtsharenko, 2022 – Papua New Guinea
- Avstroneulanda lawless Zakharov & Ovtsharenko, 2022 – Australia (Queensland)
- Avstroneulanda mariya Zakharov & Ovtsharenko, 2022 – Australia (Queensland)
- Avstroneulanda raveni Zakharov & Ovtsharenko, 2022 – Australia (Queensland, New South Wales, Victoria)
- Avstroneulanda robertsi Zakharov & Ovtsharenko, 2022 – Australia (Western Australia, South Australia, Victoria, Tasmania)
- Avstroneulanda serrata Zakharov & Ovtsharenko, 2022 – Australia (Western Australia)
- Avstroneulanda yarraman Zakharov & Ovtsharenko, 2022 – Australia (Queensland)
