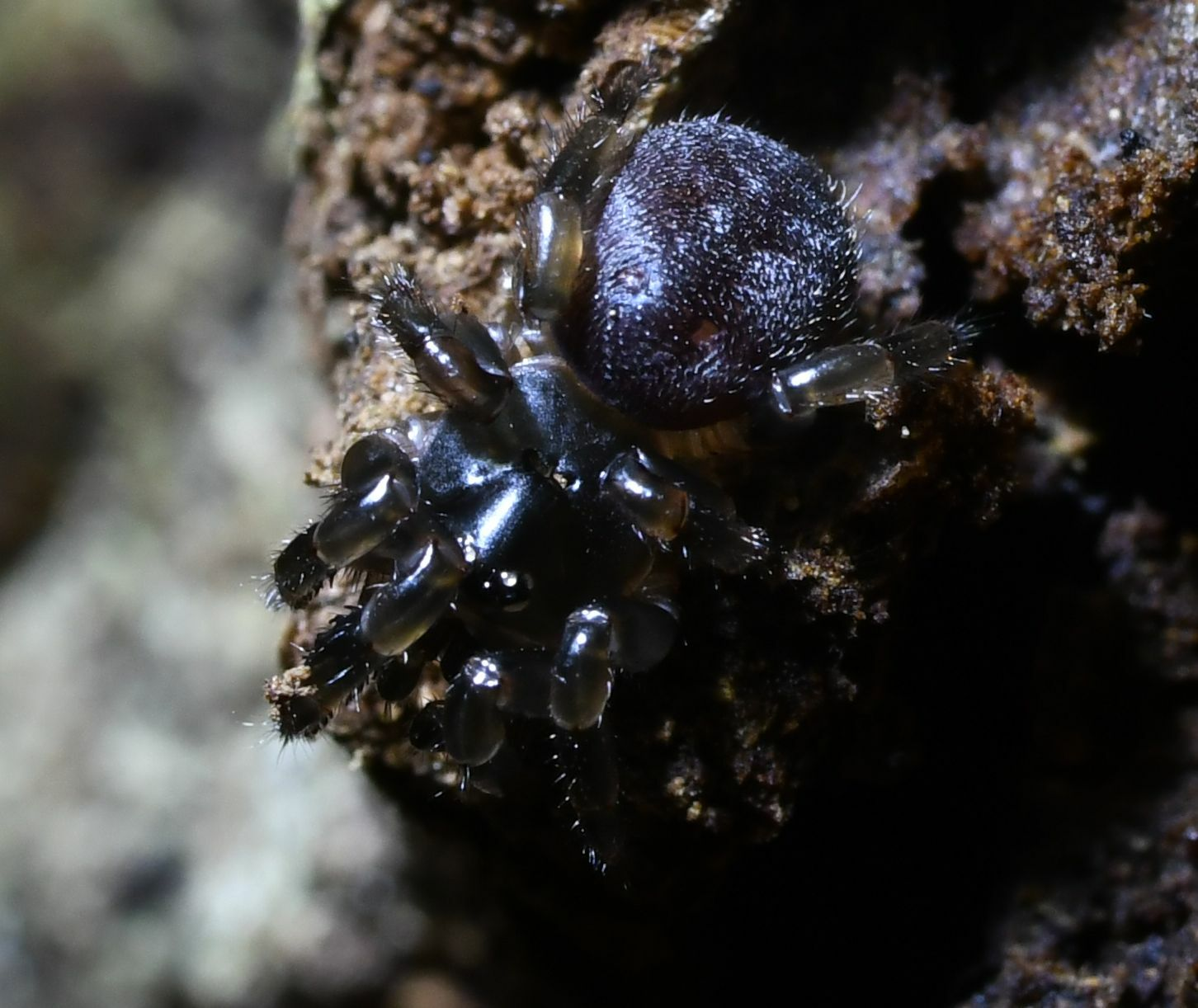
- B. tumidus

Scientific classification
- Kingdom: Animalia
- Phylum: Arthropoda
- Subphylum: Chelicerata
- Class: Arachnida
- Order: Araneae
- Infraorder: Mygalomorphae
- Family: Migidae
- Genus: Bertmainius; Harvey, Main, Rix & Cooper, 2015

Species
- 7 species, see text

= Bertmainius =

Genus of spiders

Bertmainius is a genus of spiders in the family Migidae. It was first described in 2015 by Mark Harvey, Barbara York Main, Michael Rix and Steven Cooper. As of 2017, it contains 7 species, all from Western Australia.

== Species ==
Bertmainius comprises the following species:

- Bertmainius colonus Harvey, Main, Rix & Cooper, 2015
- Bertmainius monachus Harvey, Main, Rix & Cooper, 2015
- Bertmainius mysticus Harvey, Main, Rix & Cooper, 2015
- Bertmainius opimus Harvey, Main, Rix & Cooper, 2015
- Bertmainius pandus Harvey, Main, Rix & Cooper, 2015
- Bertmainius tingle (Main, 1991)
- Bertmainius tumidus Harvey, Main, Rix & Cooper, 2015
