= Eucyrtops eremaeus =

Scientific classification
- Kingdom: Animalia
- Phylum: Arthropoda
- Subphylum: Chelicerata
- Class: Arachnida
- Order: Araneae
- Infraorder: Mygalomorphae
- Family: Idiopidae
- Genus: Eucyrtops
- Species: E. eremaeus

Binomial name
- Eucyrtops eremaeus Main, 1957

Species of spider

Eucyrtops eremaeus is a species of mygalomorph spider in the Idiopidae family. It is endemic to Australia. It was described in 1957 by Australian arachnologist Barbara York Main.

== Distribution and habitat ==
The species occurs in Western Australia in the Murchison bioregion, in open mulga shrubland habitats with braided watercourses on clay-loam soils. The type locality is Cardinia Creek, near the ghost town of Malcolm.

== Behaviour ==
The spiders are fossorial, terrestrial predators. They construct and shelter in burrows with trapdoors.
