= Cataxia stirlingi =

Scientific classification
- Kingdom: Animalia
- Phylum: Arthropoda
- Subphylum: Chelicerata
- Class: Arachnida
- Order: Araneae
- Infraorder: Mygalomorphae
- Family: Idiopidae
- Genus: Cataxia
- Species: C. stirlingi

Binomial name
- Cataxia stirlingi (Main, 1985)

Synonyms
- Neohomogona stirlingi Main, 1985; Homogona stirlingi (Main, 1985)

Species of spider

Cataxia stirlingi is a species of mygalomorph spider in the Idiopidae family. It is endemic to Australia. It was described in 1985 by Australian arachnologist Barbara York Main. The specific epithet refers to the type locality.

== Distribution and habitat ==
The species occurs in the Stirling Range of southern Western Australia, in the Mallee bioregion, in montane heathland and adjacent eucalypt forest above 400 m altitude. The type locality is the south base of Bluff Knoll in the Stirling Range National Park, some 337 km south-east of Perth.
