= Bertmainius tingle =

Conservation status
- Endangered (EPBC Act)

Scientific classification
- Kingdom: Animalia
- Phylum: Arthropoda
- Subphylum: Chelicerata
- Class: Arachnida
- Order: Araneae
- Infraorder: Mygalomorphae
- Family: Migidae
- Genus: Bertmainius
- Species: B. tingle

Binomial name
- Bertmainius tingle (Main, 1991)

Synonyms
- Moggridgea tingle Main, 1991

Species of spider

Bertmainius tingle, also called the tingle trapdoor spider, is a small basal spider endemic to the tingle and karri forest of southwestern Western Australia. This migid family species of Bertmainius was first recorded in the 1990s.

== Description ==
Bertmainius tingle is less than 10 millimetres long, the female carapace length is 2.6 - 3.1 mm. The carapace and legs are black and shiny. The Western Australian species of the family Migidae remained undiscovered until 1990 and were first described and named in the genus Moggridgea by Dr Barbara Main in 1991. B. tingle was discovered by accident in a laboratory analysis of another arachnid and the bark in which it was living, the spider was noticed when it emerged as the sample was discarded. The specific epithet is derived from the common name "tingle", the tree from which the bark was taken.

It was moved to the new genus Bertmainius by Mark Harvey and colleagues in 2015, based on significant differences in morphology and molecular data.

== Distribution ==
The species is found at two sites in the Walpole-Nornalup National Park residing in the soil or the bark of the red tingle (Eucalyptus jacksonii). The spider's habitat is located within the tingle and karri (Eucalyptus diversicolor) forests of the Warren bioregion, a biodiversity hotspot containing other species of gondwanan heritage. Other species of Bertmainius have since been described from south-western Australia.

== Ecology ==
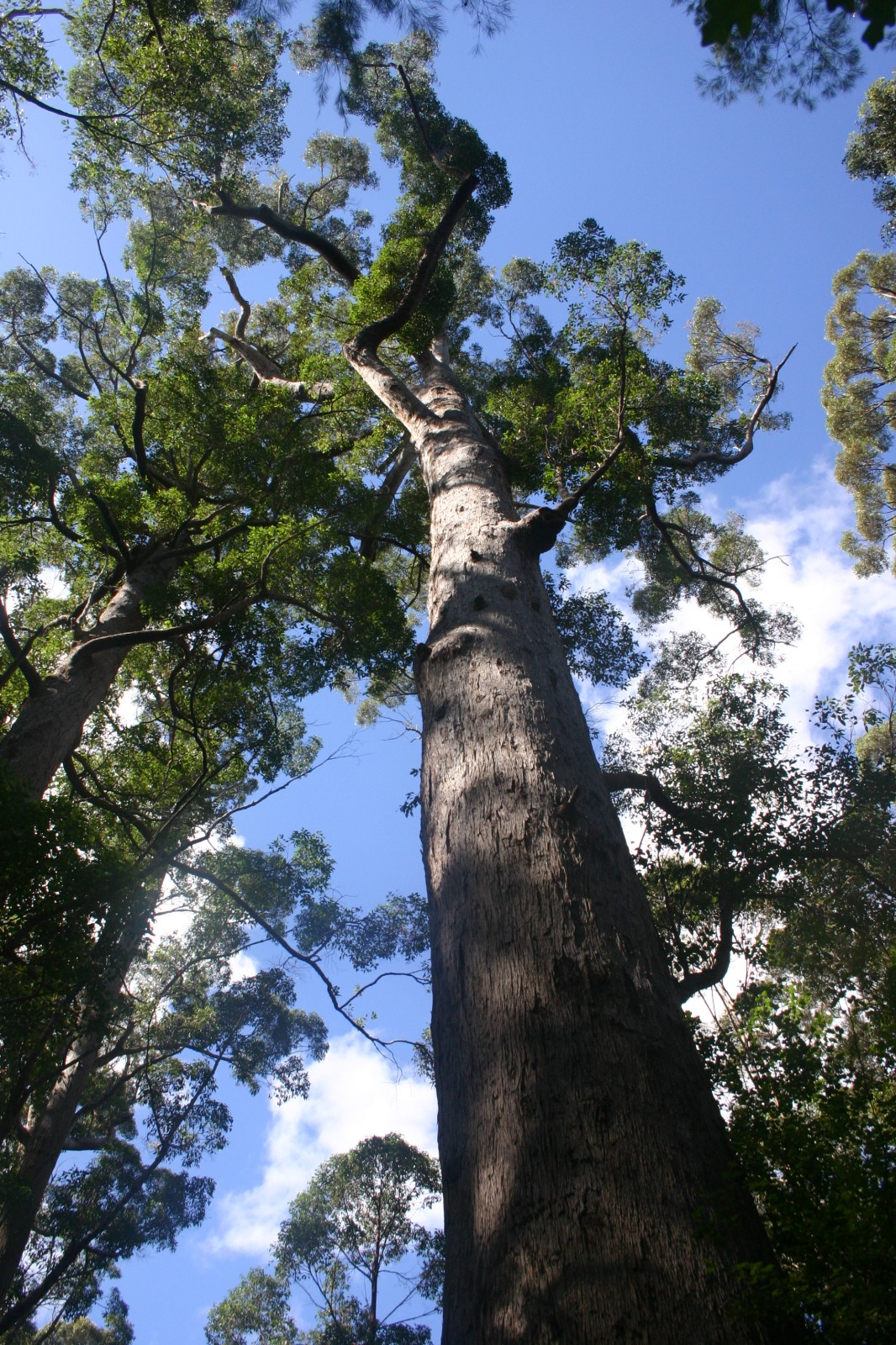
Red tingle

Bertmainius tingle live within the topsoil or in the fibrous bark of the red tingle, constructing nests of silk tubes. These tubes, up 20 mm long, have an opening at the surface of the bark or soil with a hinged 'trapdoor' cover made of moss, bark and the spider's silk. It is found in damp and shady locations.

Bertmainius tingle is vulnerable to fire and habitat destruction associated with roads. Planning exists to reduce damage to the species habitat during fire management operations such as 'prescribed burns'. It has a status of endangered under the EPBC Act and the WA Biodiversity Conservation Act due to destruction of habitat.
