= Eucanippe mallee =

Scientific classification
- Kingdom: Animalia
- Phylum: Arthropoda
- Subphylum: Chelicerata
- Class: Arachnida
- Order: Araneae
- Infraorder: Mygalomorphae
- Family: Idiopidae
- Genus: Eucanippe
- Species: E. mallee

Binomial name
- Eucanippe mallee Rix, Main, Raven & Harvey, 2018

Species of spider

Eucanippe mallee is a species of mygalomorph spider in the Idiopidae family. It is endemic to Australia. It was described in 2018 by Australian arachnologists Michael Rix, Barbara York Main, Robert Raven and Mark Harvey.

== Distribution and habitat ==
The species occurs in southern Western Australia, in the Mallee bioregion. The type locality is north of Lake King–Norseman Road.
