= Cataxia melindae =

Scientific classification
- Kingdom: Animalia
- Phylum: Arthropoda
- Subphylum: Chelicerata
- Class: Arachnida
- Order: Araneae
- Infraorder: Mygalomorphae
- Family: Idiopidae
- Genus: Cataxia
- Species: C. melindae

Binomial name
- Cataxia melindae Rix, Main, Bain & Harvey, 2017

Species of spider

Cataxia melindae is a species of mygalomorph spider in the Idiopidae family. It is endemic to Australia. It was described in 2017 by Australian arachnologists Michael Rix, Karlene Bain, Barbara York Main and Mark Harvey. The specific epithet melindae honours Melinda Moir for her dedicated biological survey work in the type locality.

== Distribution and habitat ==
The species occurs in southern Western Australia, in the Mallee bioregion, and has a known distribution restricted to mesic gullies in dense heathland on Mount Manypeaks. The type locality is the Mount Manypeaks Nature Reserve, about 35 km north-east of Albany.
