= Eucanippe mouldsi =

Scientific classification
- Kingdom: Animalia
- Phylum: Arthropoda
- Subphylum: Chelicerata
- Class: Arachnida
- Order: Araneae
- Infraorder: Mygalomorphae
- Family: Idiopidae
- Genus: Eucanippe
- Species: E. mouldsi

Binomial name
- Eucanippe mouldsi Rix, Main, Raven & Harvey, 2018

Species of spider

Eucanippe mouldsi is a species of mygalomorph spider in the Idiopidae family. It is endemic to Australia. It was described in 2018 by Australian arachnologists Michael Rix, Barbara York Main, Robert Raven and Mark Harvey.

== Distribution and habitat ==
The species occurs in south-west Western Australia, in the Avon Wheatbelt and Esperance Plains bioregions. The type locality is Gnowellan Road, Wellstead.
