= Bertmainius mysticus =

Scientific classification
- Domain: Eukaryota
- Kingdom: Animalia
- Phylum: Arthropoda
- Subphylum: Chelicerata
- Class: Arachnida
- Order: Araneae
- Infraorder: Mygalomorphae
- Family: Migidae
- Genus: Bertmainius
- Species: B. mysticus

Binomial name
- Bertmainius mysticus Main, Rix & Cooper, 2015

Species of spider

Bertmainius mysticus is a spider in the family Migidae and genus Bertmainius. It was first described in 2015 by Mark Harvey, Barbara York Main, Michael Rix and Steven Cooper, and is endemic to south-western Australia.
