= Cataxia spinipectoris =

Scientific classification
- Kingdom: Animalia
- Phylum: Arthropoda
- Subphylum: Chelicerata
- Class: Arachnida
- Order: Araneae
- Infraorder: Mygalomorphae
- Family: Idiopidae
- Genus: Cataxia
- Species: C. spinipectoris

Binomial name
- Cataxia spinipectoris Main, 1969

Species of spider

Cataxia spinipectoris is a species of mygalomorph spider in the Idiopidae family. It is endemic to Australia. It was described in 1969 by Australian arachnologist Barbara York Main.

== Distribution and habitat ==
The species occurs in eastern Queensland in tall open forest and dry vine forest habitats. The type locality is Toowoomba.

== Behaviour ==
The spiders are fossorial, terrestrial predators.
