= Eucanippe eucla =

Scientific classification
- Kingdom: Animalia
- Phylum: Arthropoda
- Subphylum: Chelicerata
- Class: Arachnida
- Order: Araneae
- Infraorder: Mygalomorphae
- Family: Idiopidae
- Genus: Eucanippe
- Species: E. eucla

Binomial name
- Eucanippe eucla Rix, Main, Raven & Harvey, 2018

Species of spider

Eucanippe eucla is a species of mygalomorph spider in the Idiopidae family. It is endemic to Australia. It was described in 2018 by Australian arachnologists Michael Rix, Barbara York Main, Robert Raven and Mark Harvey. The specific epithet refers to the type locality.

== Distribution and habitat ==
The species occurs in coastal south-eastern Western Australia, in the Hampton bioregion. The type locality is 5 km east of Eucla.
