= Eucanippe absita =

Scientific classification
- Kingdom: Animalia
- Phylum: Arthropoda
- Subphylum: Chelicerata
- Class: Arachnida
- Order: Araneae
- Infraorder: Mygalomorphae
- Family: Idiopidae
- Genus: Eucanippe
- Species: E. absita

Binomial name
- Eucanippe absita Rix, Main, Raven & Harvey, 2018

Species of spider

Eucanippe absita is a species of mygalomorph spider in the Idiopidae family. It is endemic to Australia. It was described in 2018 by Australian arachnologists Michael Rix, Barbara York Main, Robert Raven and Mark Harvey.

== Distribution and habitat ==
The species occurs in southern Western Australia, in the Coolgardie and Murchison bioregions. The type locality is Mount Mason, 100 km west-south-west of Leonora.
