= Eucanippe nemestrina =

Scientific classification
- Kingdom: Animalia
- Phylum: Arthropoda
- Subphylum: Chelicerata
- Class: Arachnida
- Order: Araneae
- Infraorder: Mygalomorphae
- Family: Idiopidae
- Genus: Eucanippe
- Species: E. nemestrina

Binomial name
- Eucanippe nemestrina Rix, Main, Raven & Harvey, 2018

Species of spider

Eucanippe nemestrina is a species of mygalomorph spider in the Idiopidae family. It is endemic to Australia. It was described in 2018 by Australian arachnologists Michael Rix, Barbara York Main, Robert Raven and Mark Harvey.

== Distribution and habitat ==
The species occurs in south-west Western Australia, in the Jarrah Forest bioregion. The type locality is the Worsley Alumina mining project on Mount Saddleback, on the Darling Scarp.
