= Cataxia victoriae =

Scientific classification
- Kingdom: Animalia
- Phylum: Arthropoda
- Subphylum: Chelicerata
- Class: Arachnida
- Order: Araneae
- Infraorder: Mygalomorphae
- Family: Idiopidae
- Genus: Cataxia
- Species: C. victoriae

Binomial name
- Cataxia victoriae (Main, 1985)

Synonyms
- Homogona victoriae Main, 1985

Species of spider

Cataxia victoriae is a species of mygalomorph spider in the Idiopidae family. It is endemic to Australia. It was described in 1985 by Australian arachnologist Barbara York Main.

== Distribution and habitat ==
The species occurs in western Victoria. The type locality is Barney's Creek in the Grampians National Park.
