= Cataxia eungellaensis =

Scientific classification
- Domain: Eukaryota
- Kingdom: Animalia
- Phylum: Arthropoda
- Subphylum: Chelicerata
- Class: Arachnida
- Order: Araneae
- Infraorder: Mygalomorphae
- Family: Idiopidae
- Genus: Cataxia
- Species: C. eungellaensis

Binomial name
- Cataxia eungellaensis Main, 1969

Species of spider

Cataxia eungellaensis is a species of idiopid spiders, found in Queensland, Australia.

== Description ==
Cataxia eungellaensis is only known from the female. It is dark brown in general colouration, the legs being dark with yellow-red naked streaks. The abdomen is moderately hairy, with a brown pattern of bands fused into a background of pale yellow. The cephalothorax is glabrous and is 10.2mm long and 8.2mm wide. The eye group is compact, with the front row slightly procurved. The sternum lacks spinules, and the labium has nine cuspules, eight of which are in an irregular row, with one anterior to them. There is one large tarsal claw sometimes with one small one beneath it.

== Biology ==
Cataxia eungellaensis prefers wet, dense rainforests where it makes its burrow on slopes where moss and ferns grow.

The burrow has a flap-like door which lies over or folds into flanged rim of the burrow; large burrows silk-lined throughout, horizontal, with the hinge lines of doors on the upward side of the opening; thus when the doors are open the apertures of the tubes face down-slope.
