= Cataxia babindaensis =

Scientific classification
- Kingdom: Animalia
- Phylum: Arthropoda
- Subphylum: Chelicerata
- Class: Arachnida
- Order: Araneae
- Infraorder: Mygalomorphae
- Family: Idiopidae
- Genus: Cataxia
- Species: C. babindaensis

Binomial name
- Cataxia babindaensis Main, 1969

Species of spider

Cataxia babindaensis, also known as the strawberry trapdoor spider, is a species of mygalomorph spider in the Idiopidae family. It is endemic to Australia. It was described in 1969 by Australian arachnologist Barbara York Main.

== Description ==
This is a relatively large species, with body lengths of up to 45 mm. The spiders have a deep red carapace and legs, and a banded abdomen.

== Distribution and habitat ==
The species occurs in north-eastern Queensland in closed forest habitats. The type locality is The Boulders National Park near Babinda.

== Behaviour ==
The spiders are fossorial, terrestrial predators that construct burrows with soft trapdoors in wet, unlittered soil, or on embankments.
