= Eucanippe agastachys =

Scientific classification
- Kingdom: Animalia
- Phylum: Arthropoda
- Subphylum: Chelicerata
- Class: Arachnida
- Order: Araneae
- Infraorder: Mygalomorphae
- Family: Idiopidae
- Genus: Eucanippe
- Species: E. agastachys

Binomial name
- Eucanippe agastachys Rix, Main, Raven & Harvey, 2018

Species of spider

Eucanippe agastachys is a species of mygalomorph spider in the Idiopidae family. It is endemic to Australia. It was described in 2018 by Australian arachnologists Michael Rix, Barbara York Main, Robert Raven and Mark Harvey.

== Distribution and habitat ==
The species occurs in south-west Western Australia, in the Avon Wheatbelt and Mallee bioregions. The type locality is Durokoppin Nature Reserve.
