= Bertmainius pandus =

Conservation status
- Critically Endangered (IUCN 3.1)

Scientific classification
- Kingdom: Animalia
- Phylum: Arthropoda
- Subphylum: Chelicerata
- Class: Arachnida
- Order: Araneae
- Infraorder: Mygalomorphae
- Family: Migidae
- Genus: Bertmainius
- Species: B. pandus

Binomial name
- Bertmainius pandus Main, Rix & Cooper, 2015

Species of spider

Bertmainius pandus is a spider in the family Migidae, and genus Bertmainius. It was first described in 2015 by Mark Harvey, Barbara York Main, Michael Rix and Steven Cooper, and is endemic to south-western Australia.
