= Cataxia sandsorum =

Scientific classification
- Kingdom: Animalia
- Phylum: Arthropoda
- Subphylum: Chelicerata
- Class: Arachnida
- Order: Araneae
- Infraorder: Mygalomorphae
- Family: Idiopidae
- Genus: Cataxia
- Species: C. sandsorum

Binomial name
- Cataxia sandsorum Rix, Main, Bain & Harvey, 2017

Species of trapdoor spider

Cataxia sandsorum is a species of mygalomorph spider in the Idiopidae family. It is endemic to Australia. It was described in 2017 by Australian arachnologists Michael Rix, Karlene Bain, Barbara York Main and Mark Harvey. The specific epithet sandsorum honours Ayleen and Tony Sands, for their hospitality and their efforts towards preserving and promoting the biodiversity of Stirling Range National Park.

== Distribution and habitat ==
The species occurs in southern Western Australia, in the Mallee bioregion, where it is restricted to upland riparian eucalypt forest on the southern side of the Stirling Range. The type locality is the south face of Pyungoorup Peak in Stirling Range National Park.
