= Cataxia cunicularis =

Scientific classification
- Kingdom: Animalia
- Phylum: Arthropoda
- Subphylum: Chelicerata
- Class: Arachnida
- Order: Araneae
- Infraorder: Mygalomorphae
- Family: Idiopidae
- Genus: Cataxia
- Species: C. cunicularis

Binomial name
- Cataxia cunicularis (Main, 1983)

Synonyms
- Homogona cunicularis Main, 1983

Species of spider

Cataxia cunicularis is a species of mygalomorph spider in the Idiopidae family. It is endemic to Australia. It was described in 1983 by Australian arachnologist Barbara York Main.

== Distribution and habitat ==
The species occurs in north-eastern Queensland in mountainous areas with closed forest habitats. The type locality is North Cedar Creek, between Atherton and Ravenshoe.

== Behaviour ==
The spiders are fossorial, terrestrial predators. They construct burrows with collar-like entrances, without trapdoors.
