= Eucanippe bifida =

Scientific classification
- Kingdom: Animalia
- Phylum: Arthropoda
- Subphylum: Chelicerata
- Class: Arachnida
- Order: Araneae
- Infraorder: Mygalomorphae
- Family: Idiopidae
- Genus: Eucanippe
- Species: E. bifida

Binomial name
- Eucanippe bifida Rix, Main, Raven & Harvey, 2017

Species of spider

Eucanippe bifida is a species of mygalomorph spider in the Idiopidae family. It is endemic to Australia. It was described in 2017 by Australian arachnologists Michael Rix, Barbara York Main, Robert Raven and Mark Harvey.

== Distribution and habitat ==
The species occurs in southern Western Australia, in the Esperance Plains and Mallee bioregions. The type locality is 24.3 km west of Ravensthorpe.
