= Cataxia dietrichae =

Scientific classification
- Kingdom: Animalia
- Phylum: Arthropoda
- Subphylum: Chelicerata
- Class: Arachnida
- Order: Araneae
- Infraorder: Mygalomorphae
- Family: Idiopidae
- Genus: Cataxia
- Species: C. dietrichae

Binomial name
- Cataxia dietrichae Main, 1985

Species of spider

Cataxia dietrichae is a species of mygalomorph spider in the Idiopidae family. It is endemic to Australia. It was described in 1985 by Australian arachnologist Barbara York Main.

== Distribution and habitat ==
The species occurs in eastern coastal Queensland. The type locality is 9.5 km west of Bowen in the Whitsunday Region.
