= Cataxia barrettae =

Scientific classification
- Kingdom: Animalia
- Phylum: Arthropoda
- Subphylum: Chelicerata
- Class: Arachnida
- Order: Araneae
- Infraorder: Mygalomorphae
- Family: Idiopidae
- Genus: Cataxia
- Species: C. barrettae

Binomial name
- Cataxia barrettae Rix, Main, Bain & Harvey, 2017

Synonyms
- Neohomogona stirlingi Main, 1985

Species of spider

Cataxia barrettae is a species of mygalomorph spider in the Idiopidae family. It is endemic to Australia. It was described in 2017 by Australian arachnologists Michael Rix, Karlene Bain, Barbara York Main and Mark Harvey. The specific epithet barrettae honours Sarah Barrett for her pioneering survey work in high altitude habitats of the Great Southern region.

== Distribution and habitat ==
The species occurs in southern Western Australia, in the Mallee bioregion, in montane heathland habitats at elevations of over 500 m in the Stirling Range. The type locality is the summit track to Talyuberlup Peak in the Stirling Range National Park.
