= Cataxia pallida =

Scientific classification
- Kingdom: Animalia
- Phylum: Arthropoda
- Subphylum: Chelicerata
- Class: Arachnida
- Order: Araneae
- Infraorder: Mygalomorphae
- Family: Idiopidae
- Genus: Cataxia
- Species: C. pallida

Binomial name
- Cataxia pallida (Rainbow & Pulleine, 1918)

Synonyms
- Armadalia pallida Rainbow & Pulleine, 1918

Species of spider

Cataxia pallida is a species of mygalomorph spider in the Idiopidae family. It is endemic to Australia. It was described in 1918 by Australian arachnologists William Joseph Rainbow and Robert Henry Pulleine.

== Distribution and habitat ==
The species occurs in eastern Queensland in open forest habitats. The type locality is Eidsvold in the North Burnett Region.

== Behaviour ==
The spiders are fossorial, terrestrial predators.
