= Gaius austini =

Scientific classification
- Kingdom: Animalia
- Phylum: Arthropoda
- Subphylum: Chelicerata
- Class: Arachnida
- Order: Araneae
- Infraorder: Mygalomorphae
- Family: Idiopidae
- Genus: Gaius
- Species: G. austini

Binomial name
- Gaius austini Rix, Raven & Harvey, 2018

Species of spider

Gaius austini is a species of mygalomorph spider in the Idiopidae family. It is endemic to Australia. It was described in 2018 by Australian arachnologists Michael Rix, Robert Raven and Mark Harvey.

== Distribution and habitat ==
The species occurs in Western Australia in the Coolgardie bioregion. The type locality is Coolgardie, some 560 km east of Perth.
