= Cataxia bolganupensis =

Scientific classification
- Kingdom: Animalia
- Phylum: Arthropoda
- Subphylum: Chelicerata
- Class: Arachnida
- Order: Araneae
- Infraorder: Mygalomorphae
- Family: Idiopidae
- Genus: Cataxia
- Species: C. bolganupensis

Binomial name
- Cataxia bolganupensis (Main, 1985)

Synonyms
- Neohomogona bolganupensis Main, 1985; Homogona bolganupensis (Main, 1985)

Species of spider

Cataxia bolganupensis, also known as the Porongurup trapdoor spider, is a species of mygalomorph spider in the Idiopidae family. It is endemic to Australia. It was described in 1985 by Australian arachnologist Barbara York Main. The specific epithet refers to the type locality.

== Distribution and habitat ==
The species occurs in southern Western Australia in the Mallee bioregion, in wet karri forest on the south side of the Porongurup Range. The type locality is a track on Nancy Peak above Bolganup Dam, in Porongurup National Park, some 40 km (25 mi) north of Albany.

In early 2024, a team of volunteers headed by experts relocated around 40 of the spiders to a nearby location after plans were made to build a picnic area over their burrows.
