= Eucyrtops ksenijae =

Scientific classification
- Kingdom: Animalia
- Phylum: Arthropoda
- Subphylum: Chelicerata
- Class: Arachnida
- Order: Araneae
- Infraorder: Mygalomorphae
- Family: Idiopidae
- Genus: Eucyrtops
- Species: E. ksenijae

Binomial name
- Eucyrtops ksenijae Rix & Harvey, 2022

Species of spider

Eucyrtops ksenijae is a species of mygalomorph spider in the Idiopidae family. It is endemic to Australia. It was described in 2022 by Australian arachnologists Michael Rix and Mark Harvey. The specific epithet ksenijae honours Ksenija Leonija Elizabete Blosfelds (nee Koslowskis) (1906-2003), who died just before the type specimens were collected, in recognition of her remarkable life.

== Distribution and habitat ==
The species occurs in south-west Western Australia, in the Jarrah Forest and Avon Wheatbelt bioregions. The type locality is the junction of Arthur River and the Albany Highway, a site dominated by Allocasuarina and Acacia woodland, but surrounded by cleared land used for farming.
