= Cataxia pulleinei =

Scientific classification
- Kingdom: Animalia
- Phylum: Arthropoda
- Subphylum: Chelicerata
- Class: Arachnida
- Order: Araneae
- Infraorder: Mygalomorphae
- Family: Idiopidae
- Genus: Cataxia
- Species: C. pulleinei

Binomial name
- Cataxia pulleinei (Rainbow, 1914)

Synonyms
- Homogona pulleinei Rainbow, 1914

Species of spider

Cataxia pulleinei is a species of mygalomorph spider in the Idiopidae family. It is endemic to Australia. It was described in 1914 by Australian arachnologist William Joseph Rainbow. The specific epithet pulleinei honours fellow arachnologist Robert Henry Pulleine.

== Distribution and habitat ==
The species occurs in south-eastern Queensland and north-eastern New South Wales, including the McPherson Ranges, in closed forest habitats. The type locality is Lismore in the Northern Rivers region.

== Behaviour ==
The spiders are fossorial, terrestrial predators which construct burrows with flap-like trapdoors in tree stumps, logs and soil.
