= Eucyrtops =

Scientific classification
- Kingdom: Animalia
- Phylum: Arthropoda
- Subphylum: Chelicerata
- Class: Arachnida
- Order: Araneae
- Infraorder: Mygalomorphae
- Family: Idiopidae
- Genus: Eucyrtops; Pocock, 1897

Type species
- E. latior (O. Pickard-Cambridge, 1877)

Species
- See text.

Genus of spiders

Eucyrtops is a genus of Australian armoured trapdoor spiders that was first described by Reginald Innes Pocock in 1897.

== Species ==
As of August 2022 the genus contained three species, all from Western Australia:

- Eucyrtops eremaeus Main, 1957
- Eucyrtops ksenijae (Rix & Harvey, 2022)
- Eucyrtops latior (O. Pickard-Cambridge, 1877)
