= Encoptarthria =

Scientific classification
- Kingdom: Animalia
- Phylum: Arthropoda
- Subphylum: Chelicerata
- Class: Arachnida
- Order: Araneae
- Infraorder: Araneomorphae
- Family: Gnaphosidae
- Genus: Encoptarthria; Main, 1954

Type species
- E. echemophthalma (Simon, 1908)

Species
- 5, see text

Genus of spiders

Encoptarthria is a genus of Australian ground spiders that was first described by Barbara York Main in 1954. Originally placed in the no longer recognized family Prodidomidae, it was moved to the family Gnaphosidae in 2007.

== Species ==
As of May 2019 it contains five species:

- Encoptarthria echemophthalma (Simon, 1908) (type) – Australia (Western Australia)
- Encoptarthria grisea (L. Koch, 1873) – Australia
- Encoptarthria penicillata (Simon, 1908) – Australia (Western Australia)
- Encoptarthria perpusilla (Simon, 1908) – Australia (Western Australia)
- Encoptarthria vestigator (Simon, 1908) – Australia (Western Australia)
