= Cataxia =

Scientific classification
- Kingdom: Animalia
- Phylum: Arthropoda
- Subphylum: Chelicerata
- Class: Arachnida
- Order: Araneae
- Infraorder: Mygalomorphae
- Family: Idiopidae
- Genus: Cataxia; Rainbow, 1914

Type species
- C. maculata Rainbow, 1914

Species
- 15, see text

Synonyms
- Homogona Rainbow, 1914; Neohomogona Main, 1985

Genus of spiders

Cataxia is a genus of Australian armoured trapdoor spiders that was first described by William Joseph Rainbow in 1914.

== Species ==
As of May 2019 the genus contained fifteen species from the states of New South Wales (NSW), Queensland (QLD), Victoria (VIC) or Western Australia (WA):

- Cataxia babindaensis Main, 1969 – QLD
- Cataxia barrettae Rix, Bain, Main & Harvey, 2017 – WA
- Cataxia bolganupensis (Main, 1985) – WA
- Cataxia colesi Rix, Bain, Main & Harvey, 2017 – WA
- Cataxia cunicularis (Main, 1983) – QLD
- Cataxia dietrichae Main, 1985 – QLD
- Cataxia eungellaensis Main, 1969 – QLD
- Cataxia maculata Rainbow, 1914 (type) – QLD
- Cataxia melindae Rix, Bain, Main & Harvey, 2017 – WA
- Cataxia pallida (Rainbow & Pulleine, 1918) – QLD
- Cataxia pulleinei (Rainbow, 1914) – NSW, QLD
- Cataxia sandsorum Rix, Bain, Main & Harvey, 2017 – WA
- Cataxia spinipectoris Main, 1969 – QLD
- Cataxia stirlingi (Main, 1985) – WA
- Cataxia victoriae (Main, 1985) – VIC
