= Number 16 (spider) =

Oldest recorded individual spider

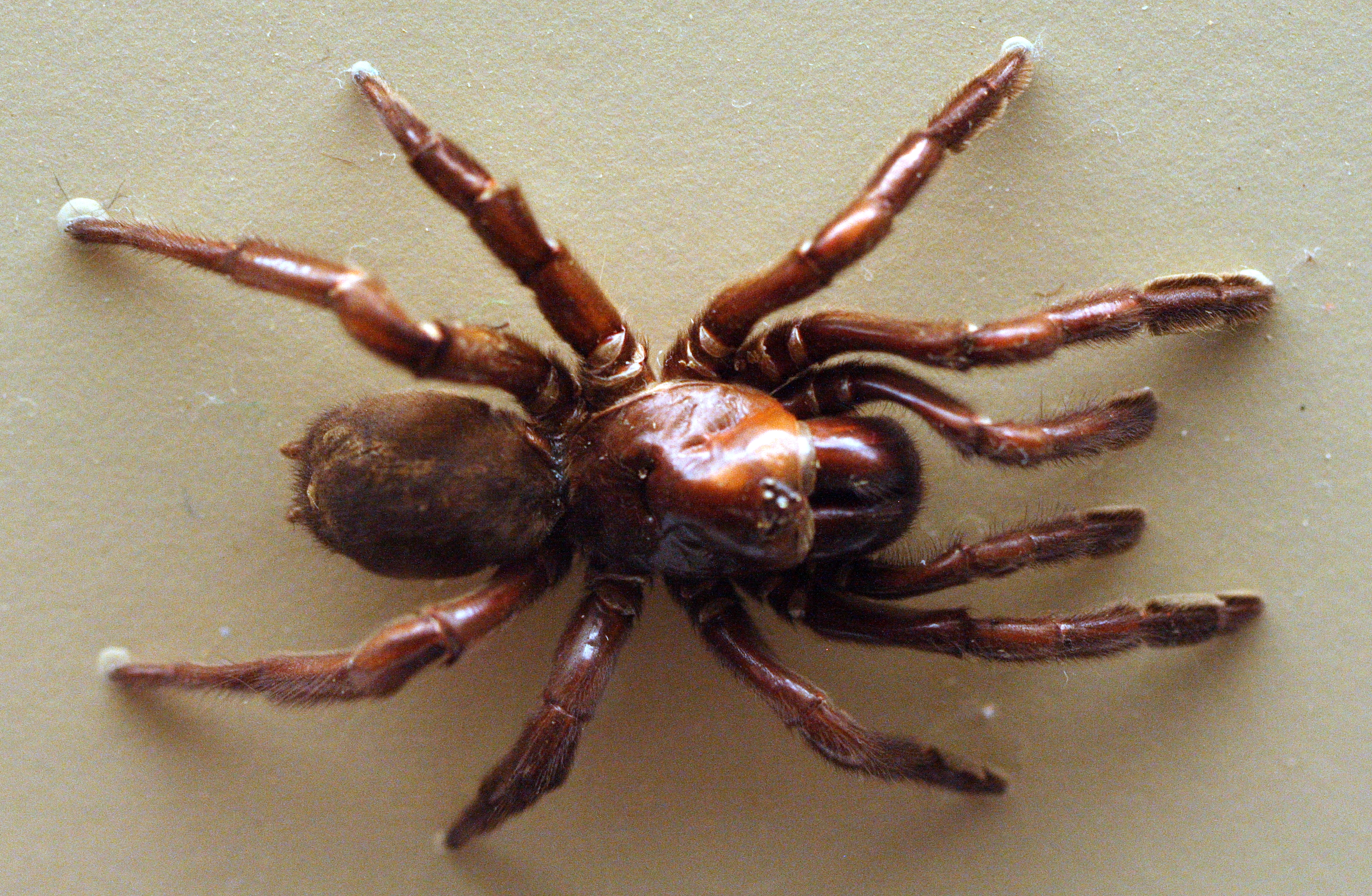
- A Gaius villosus specimen in the Australian Museum.
- Species: Gaius villosus
- Sex: Female
- Born: 1972 or 1973; North Bungulla Reserve, Western Australia
- Died: 2016 (aged about 43); North Bungulla Reserve, Western Australia
- Known for: Subject of long-term monitoring project; oldest known spider

Number 16 (c. 1974 – 2016), also known as #16, was a wild female trapdoor spider (Gaius villosus, family Idiopidae) that lived in North Bungulla Reserve near Tammin, Western Australia. She lived an estimated 43 years and became the longest-lived spider on record, beating a 28-year-old tarantula who previously held the title. Number 16 died in 2016 from a parasitic wasp sting.

== Long-term monitoring ==
In March 1974, Australian arachnologist Barbara York Main began a long-term study of spider families. She marked off ten spiders and returned the following year to find new spiderlings, including Number 16, that had likely been born after the first autumn rain of 1974. (Note: Number 16 would have hatched in late 1972 or early 1973. In Aganippine trapdoor spiders: "Eggs are laid during late spring and early summer (October through November). The young emerge from the egg cocoon during midsummer (late December through mid-January). The brood animals remain in the female's burrow until early winter, emerging only after substantial rains when the ground is wet and soft.") Main returned to the site annually, sometimes more frequently, for more than four decades.

Like other trapdoor spiders, Number 16 spent her entire life in the same burrow, subsisting off the edible insects that walked on her burrow's trapdoor-like silk roof. As Number 16 became older, Main and her researchers developed a tradition of always checking her burrow first. For her 40th birthday, research assistant Leanda Mason wanted to give the spider a mealworm, but Main denied the request since it would interfere with the study.

Because of Number 16, Main's project took far longer than she had expected. She continued to work into her late 80s, but she "began to look forward to the project's end," The Washington Post reported. Finally, when Main's own health declined before the spider's, she passed the project on to Leanda Mason.

== Death ==
On 31 October 2016, researcher Leanda Mason discovered Number 16's burrow in disrepair. The spider was gone. Evidence suggested she was killed by a parasitic spider wasp which had pierced the silk plug of her burrow. During a survey six months earlier, Number 16 had been alive. Mason stated that "She was cut down in her prime [...] It took a while to sink in". The spider's death received widespread publicity in late April 2018, with the publication of a research article in the journal Pacific Conservation Biology. Based on the burrow fidelity of females of her species, the researchers concluded with a "high level of certainty" that Number 16 was 43 years old at the time of her death.

After retiring, Barbara York Main moved to a care facility for Alzheimer's disease. Leanda Mason, who kept in contact with her mentor, said in 2018 that Barbara "remembers No. 16" but "forgets that she's died." Barbara York Main died in 2019.
