= Eucanippe =

Scientific classification
- Domain: Eukaryota
- Kingdom: Animalia
- Phylum: Arthropoda
- Subphylum: Chelicerata
- Class: Arachnida
- Order: Araneae
- Infraorder: Mygalomorphae
- Family: Idiopidae
- Genus: Eucanippe; Rix, Main, Raven & Harvey, 2017

Type species
- E. bifida Rix, Main, Raven & Harvey, 2017

Species
- 7, see text

Genus of spiders

Eucanippe is a genus of Western Australian armored trapdoor spiders first described by Michael Gordon Rix, Robert J. Raven, Barbara York Main, S. E. Harrison, A. D. Austin, S. J. B. Cooper & Mark Stephen Harvey in 2017.

== Species ==
As of April 2019 the genus contained seven species, all from Western Australia:

- Eucanippe absita Rix, Main, Raven & Harvey, 2018
- Eucanippe agastachys Rix, Main, Raven & Harvey, 2018
- Eucanippe bifida Rix, Main, Raven & Harvey, 2017
- Eucanippe eucla Rix, Main, Raven & Harvey, 2018
- Eucanippe mallee Rix, Main, Raven & Harvey, 2018
- Eucanippe mouldsi Rix, Main, Raven & Harvey, 2018
- Eucanippe nemestrina Rix, Main, Raven & Harvey, 2018
