= Cataxia colesi =

Scientific classification
- Kingdom: Animalia
- Phylum: Arthropoda
- Subphylum: Chelicerata
- Class: Arachnida
- Order: Araneae
- Infraorder: Mygalomorphae
- Family: Idiopidae
- Genus: Cataxia
- Species: C. colesi

Binomial name
- Cataxia colesi Rix, Bain, Main & Harvey, 2017

Species of spider

Cataxia colesi is a species of spider native to south-western Australia. The species has an extremely small distribution range, restricted to individual sky islands in the Stirling Range National Park. It digs burrows up to 20 cm deep.
