= Gaius aurora =

Scientific classification
- Kingdom: Animalia
- Phylum: Arthropoda
- Subphylum: Chelicerata
- Class: Arachnida
- Order: Araneae
- Infraorder: Mygalomorphae
- Family: Idiopidae
- Genus: Gaius
- Species: G. aurora

Binomial name
- Gaius aurora Rix, Raven & Harvey, 2018

Species of spider

Gaius aurora is a species of mygalomorph spider in the Idiopidae family. It is endemic to Australia. It was described in 2018 by Australian arachnologists Michael Rix, Robert Raven and Mark Harvey. The specific epithet aurora refers to the type locality.

== Distribution and habitat ==
The species occurs in Western Australia in the Coolgardie bioregion. The type locality is Bungalbin Hill in the Helena and Aurora Range.
