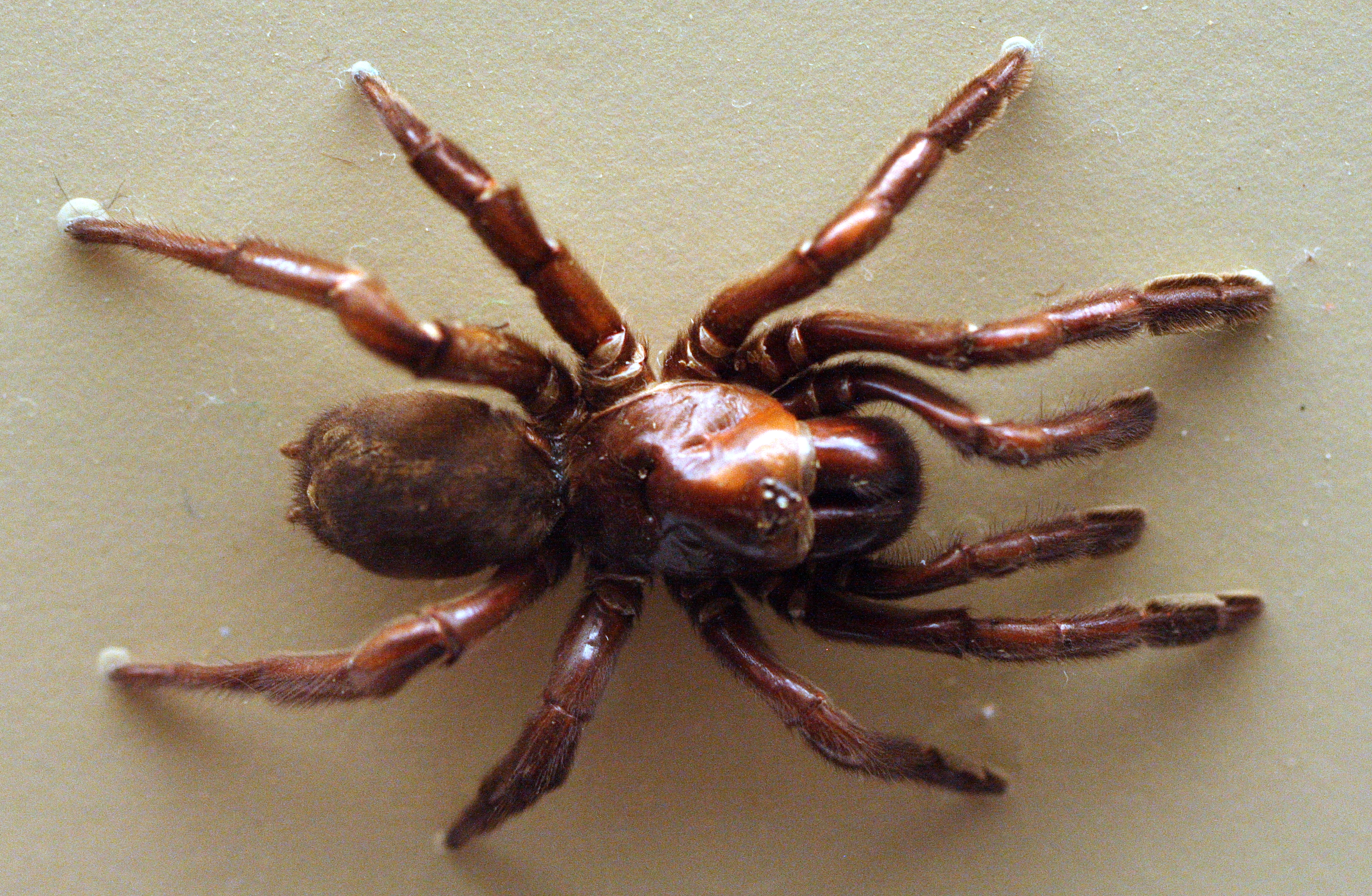

Scientific classification
- Kingdom: Animalia
- Phylum: Arthropoda
- Subphylum: Chelicerata
- Class: Arachnida
- Order: Araneae
- Infraorder: Mygalomorphae
- Family: Idiopidae
- Genus: Gaius
- Species: G. villosus

Binomial name
- Gaius villosus Rainbow, 1914

Synonyms
- Anidiops villosus (Rainbow, 1914)

= Gaius villosus =

Species of spider

Gaius villosus is a species of spider in the family Idiopidae (armored trapdoor spiders) found in Western Australia in a variety of different habitats.

Originally described in 1914 as Gaius villosus by William Joseph Rainbow, in 1957 it was transferred to Anidiops by Barbara York Main (a genus no longer recognized). In 2017, it was returned to Gaius by Rix and others – at the time it was the sole species in the genus, although others have been added since.

Number 16, aged approximately 43 years at death and thought to be the longest-lived spider on record, was a female of this species.
