= Cataxia maculata =

Scientific classification
- Kingdom: Animalia
- Phylum: Arthropoda
- Subphylum: Chelicerata
- Class: Arachnida
- Order: Araneae
- Infraorder: Mygalomorphae
- Family: Idiopidae
- Genus: Cataxia
- Species: C. maculata

Binomial name
- Cataxia maculata Rainbow, 1914

Synonyms
- Cataxia tetrica Rainbow & Pulleine, 1918; Arbanitis inornatus Rainbow & Pulleine, 1918

Species of spider

Cataxia maculata is a species of mygalomorph spider in the Idiopidae family. It is endemic to Australia. It was described in 1914 by Australian arachnologist William Joseph Rainbow.

== Distribution and habitat ==
The species occurs in eastern Queensland, in the Eidsvold–Proserpine region, in brigalow and vine thicket open forest habitats. The type locality is the upper Burnett River.

== Behaviour ==
The spiders are fossorial, terrestrial predators which construct burrows with wafer-like trapdoors.
