= Eucyrtops latior =

Scientific classification
- Kingdom: Animalia
- Phylum: Arthropoda
- Subphylum: Chelicerata
- Class: Arachnida
- Order: Araneae
- Infraorder: Mygalomorphae
- Family: Idiopidae
- Genus: Eucyrtops
- Species: E. latior

Binomial name
- Eucyrtops latior (O.Pickard-Cambridge, 1877)

Synonyms
- Aganippe latior O.Pickard-Cambridge, 1877

Species of spider

Eucyrtops latior is a species of mygalomorph spider in the Idiopidae family. It is endemic to Australia. It was described in 1877 by British arachnologist Octavius Pickard-Cambridge.

== Distribution and habitat ==
The species occurs in south-west Western Australia, in the Jarrah Forest and Swan Coastal Plain bioregions, in open forest habitats with heavily littered sandy and loamy soils.

== Behaviour ==
The spiders are fossorial, terrestrial predators which construct burrows with thin trapdoors.
