= Mainosa =

Scientific classification
- Kingdom: Animalia
- Phylum: Arthropoda
- Subphylum: Chelicerata
- Class: Arachnida
- Order: Araneae
- Infraorder: Araneomorphae
- Family: Lycosidae
- Genus: Mainosa
- Species: M. longipes

Binomial name
- Mainosa longipes (L. Koch, 1878)

Genus of spiders

Mainosa is a genus of spiders in the family Lycosidae. It was first described in 2006 by Framenau. As of 2017, it contains only one species, Mainosa longipes, found in Australia.
