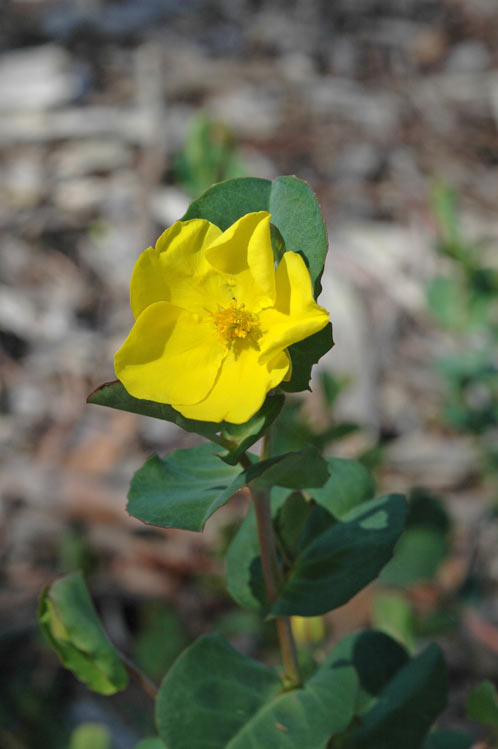

Conservation status
- Priority Four — Rare Taxa (DEC)

Scientific classification
- Kingdom: Plantae
- Clade: Tracheophytes
- Clade: Angiosperms
- Clade: Eudicots
- Order: Dilleniales
- Family: Dilleniaceae
- Genus: Hibbertia
- Species: H. porongurupensis

Binomial name
- Hibbertia porongurupensis J.R.Wheeler & Hoogland

= Hibbertia porongurupensis =

Species of flowering plant

Hibbertia porongurupensis is a species of flowering plant in the family Dilleniaceae and is endemic to a restricted area of the south-west of Western Australia. It is a glabrous shrub with broadly elliptic to more or less round leaves and yellow flowers arranged singly in leaf axils with large numbers of stamens arranged around five carpels.

== Description ==
Hibbertia porongurupensis is an erect, glabrous shrub that typically grows to a height of up to 2 m (6 ft 7 in) with flattened, slightly winged stems. Its leaves are arranged alternately along the branches, broadly elliptic to more or less round, 12–55 mm (0.47–2.17 in) long, wide and sessile, with the base wrapped around the stem. The flowers are arranged singly in leaf axils on a peduncle 15–30 mm (0.59–1.18 in) long with a single oblong bract 7–10 mm (0.28–0.39 in) long at the base. The five sepals are 10–15 mm (0.39–0.59 in) long and joined at the base, the inner sepals narrower than the outer ones. The five petals are yellow, broadly egg-shaped with the narrower end towards the base and 10–20 mm (0.39–0.79 in) long with a notch at the tip. There are many stamens and sometimes a few staminodes arranged in a ring around the five glabrous carpels, each with three to five ovules. Flowering occurs from September to October.

== Taxonomy ==
Hibbertia porongurupensis was first formally described in 2000 by Judith R. Wheeler and Ruurd Dirk Hoogland in the journal Nuytsia from specimens collected by Hoogland at the base of the Devil's Slide in the Porongurup Range in 1971. The specific epithet (porongurupensis) refers to the type location.

== Distribution and habitat ==
The hibbertia grows in rock crevices and on rock outcrops, restricted to the upper slopes of the Porongurup Range.

== Conservation status ==
Hibbertia porongurupensis is classified as "Priority Four" by the Government of Western Australia Department of Parks and Wildlife, meaning that is rare or near threatened.

== See also ==
- List of Hibbertia species
