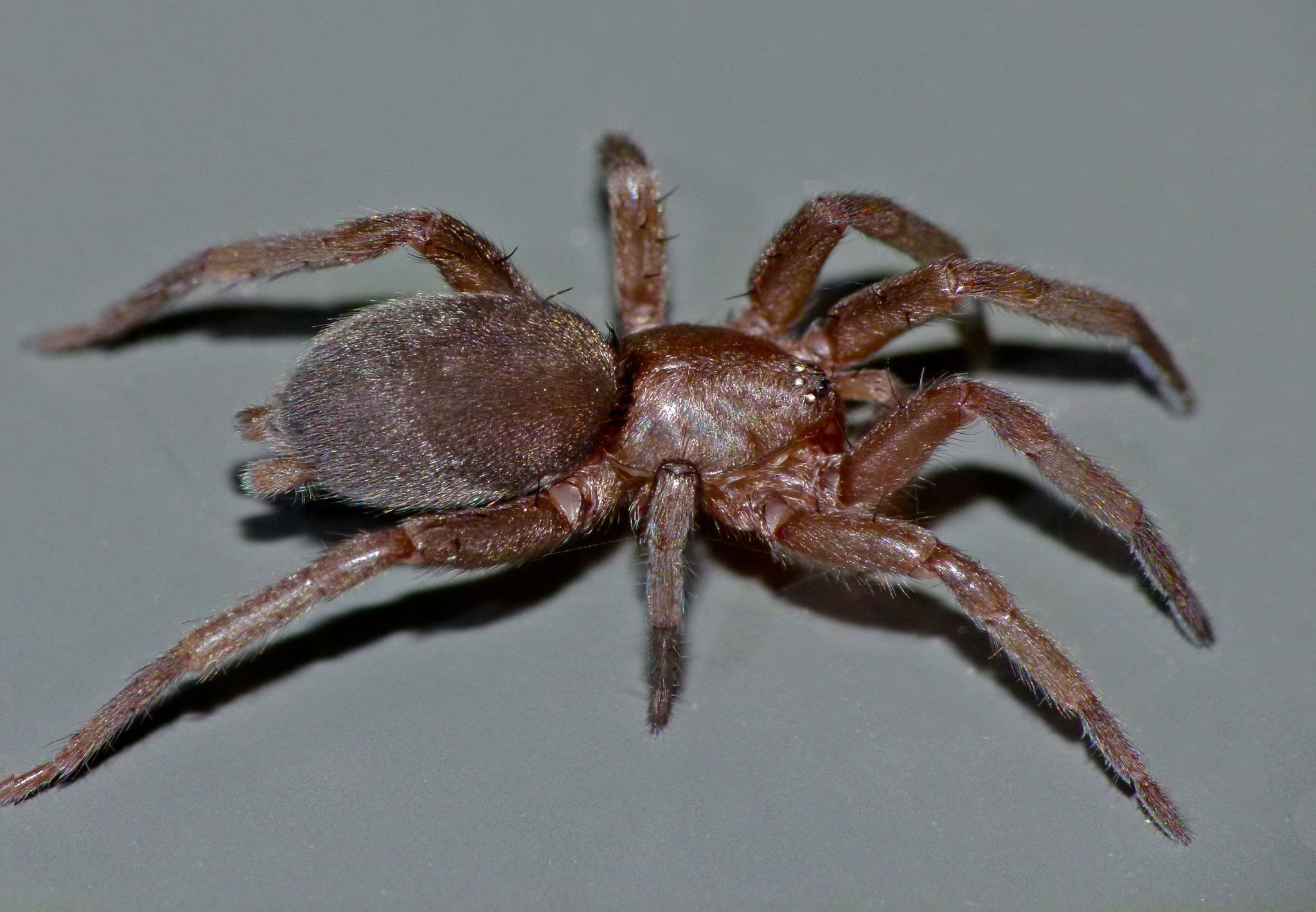

Scientific classification
- Kingdom: Animalia
- Phylum: Arthropoda
- Subphylum: Chelicerata
- Class: Arachnida
- Order: Araneae
- Infraorder: Araneomorphae
- Family: Gnaphosidae
- Genus: Zelanda; Özdikmen, 2009

Type species
- Z. erebus (L. Koch, 1873)

Species
- 6, see text

= Zelanda =

Genus of spiders

Zelanda is a genus of South Pacific ground spiders that was first described by H. Özdikmen in 2009.

== Species ==
As of May 2019 it contains six species, all found in New Zealand:

- Zelanda elongata (Forster, 1979) – New Zealand
- Zelanda erebus (L. Koch, 1873) (type) – New Zealand
- Zelanda kaituna (Forster, 1979) – New Zealand
- Zelanda miranda (Forster, 1979) – New Zealand
- Zelanda obtusa (Forster, 1979) – New Zealand
- Zelanda titirangia (Ovtsharenko, Fedoryak & Zakharov, 2006) – New Zealand
