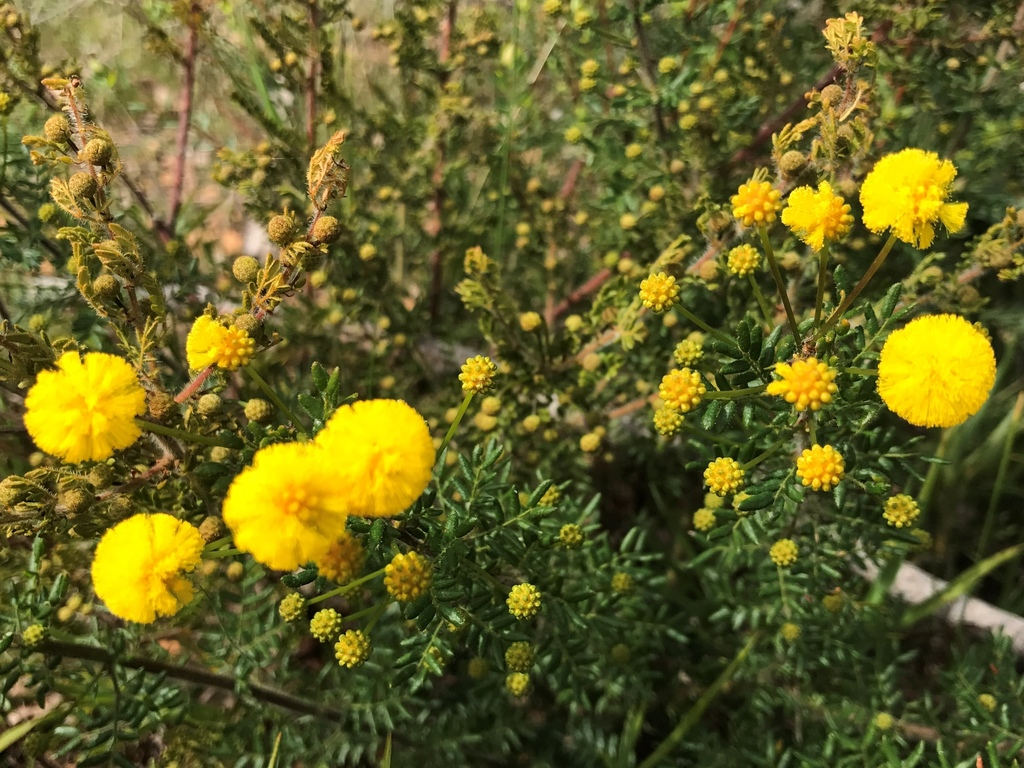
- Near Manjimup

Scientific classification
- Kingdom: Plantae
- Clade: Embryophytes
- Clade: Tracheophytes
- Clade: Spermatophytes
- Clade: Angiosperms
- Clade: Eudicots
- Clade: Rosids
- Order: Fabales
- Family: Fabaceae
- Subfamily: Caesalpinioideae
- Clade: Mimosoid clade
- Genus: Acacia
- Species: A. lateriticola

Binomial name
- Acacia lateriticola Maslin
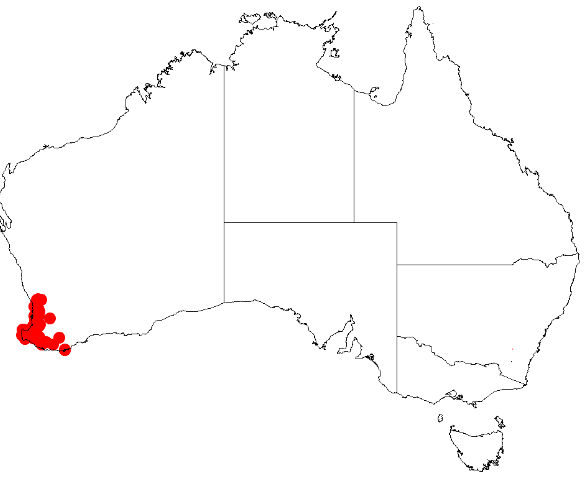
- Occurrence data from AVH

Synonyms
- Acacia strigosa f. genuina Meisn. nom. inval., nom. nud.; Acacia strigosa var. borealis E.Pritz.; Racosperma lateriticola (Maslin) Pedley

= Acacia lateriticola =

Species of legume

Acacia lateriticola is a species of flowering plant in the family Fabaceae and is endemic to the south-west of Western Australia. It is a shrub, usually with hairy branchlets, and pinnatipartite leaves, spherical heads of light golden yellow flowers and narrowly oblong, crusty pods.

== Description ==
Acacia lateriticola is a shrub that typically grows to a height of 0.4–1.5 m (1 ft 4 in – 4 ft 11 in) and usually has hairy branchlets. Its leaves are pinnatipartite, mostly with two pairs of pinnae, the lower pinnae 2–6 mm (0.079–0.236 in) long with up to three pairs of pinnules and the outer pinnae 6–20 mm (0.24–0.79 in) long with narrowly oblong to lance-shaped pinnules 4–8 mm (0.16–0.31 in) long and 1.5–3 mm (0.059–0.118 in) wide. The flowers are borne on one or two spherical heads in axils on glabrous peduncles 15–30 mm (0.59–1.18 in) long, each head 7–10 mm (0.28–0.39 in) long with 24 to 36 light golden yellow, rarely cream-coloured flowers. Flowering occurs from May to October, and the pods are narrowly oblong, 30–50 mm (1.2–2.0 in) long, 7–11 mm (0.28–0.43 in) wide and crusty.

== Taxonomy ==
Acacia lateriticola was first formally described in 1975 by Bruce Maslin in the journal Nuytsia from specimens he collected 13 km (8.1 mi) south of Donnybrook in 1972. The specific epithet (lateriticola) means 'red brick inhabitant' referring to the habitat on laterite.

== Distribution ==
This species of wattle grows on lateritic soil in jarrah and marri forest from near Muchea and south to near Pemberton and Busselton in the Jarrah Forest, Swan Coastal Plain and Warren bioregions of south-western Western Australia.

== Conservation status ==
Acacia lateriticola is listed as 'not threatened' by the Government of Western Australia Department of Biodiversity, Conservation and Attractions.

== See also ==
- List of Acacia species
