= Megaloastia =

Scientific classification
- Kingdom: Animalia
- Phylum: Arthropoda
- Subphylum: Chelicerata
- Class: Arachnida
- Order: Araneae
- Infraorder: Araneomorphae
- Family: Salticidae
- Genus: Megaloastia; Zabka, 1995
- Species: M. mainae

Binomial name
- Megaloastia mainae Zabka, 1995

Genus of spiders

Megaloastia is a genus of spiders from Western Australia, which is placed in the jumping spider family, Salticidae. The genus has only one species, Megaloastia mainae.
