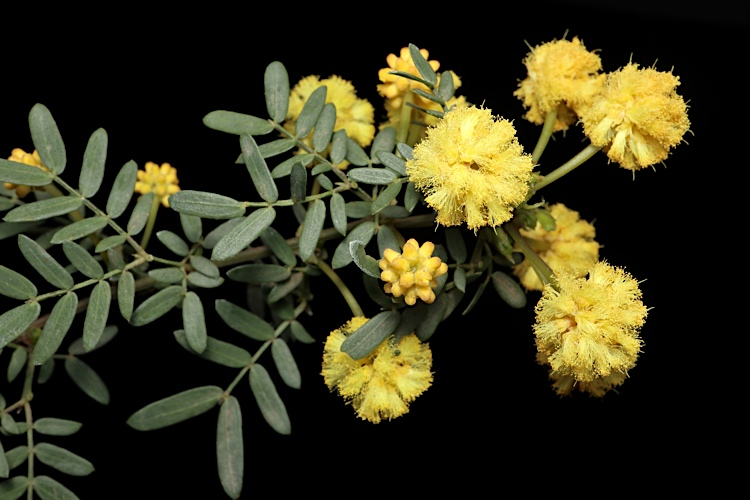
- In the Australian National Botanic Gardens

Scientific classification
- Kingdom: Plantae
- Clade: Embryophytes
- Clade: Tracheophytes
- Clade: Spermatophytes
- Clade: Angiosperms
- Clade: Eudicots
- Clade: Rosids
- Order: Fabales
- Family: Fabaceae
- Subfamily: Caesalpinioideae
- Clade: Mimosoid clade
- Genus: Acacia
- Species: A. leioderma

Binomial name
- Acacia leioderma Maslin
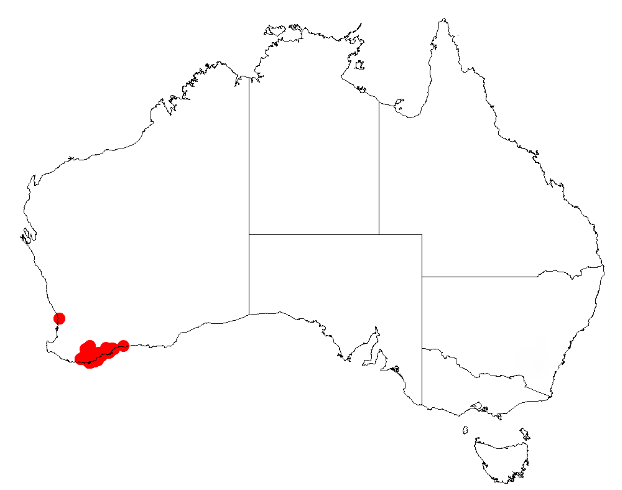
- Occurrence data from AVH

Synonyms
- Racosperma leiodermum (Maslin) Pedley

= Acacia leioderma =

Porongurup wattle

Species of legume

Acacia leioderma is a species of flowering plant in the family Fabaceae and is endemic to the extreme south-west of Western Australia. It is a shrub with glabrous, ribbed branchlets, bipinnate leaves, up to three spherical heads of light golden yellow flowers and glabrous pods.

== Description ==
Acacia leioderma is a shrub that typically grows to a height of 0.5–2 m (1 ft 8 in – 6 ft 7 in) and has glabrous, prominently ribbed, usually red to brown branchlets. Its leaves are bipinnate with mostly two pairs of pinnae, the lower pair 3–4 mm (0.12–0.16 in) long, the outer pair 10–30 mm (0.39–1.18 in) long on a rachis 3–10 mm (0.12–0.39 in) long, the petiole 1–2 mm (0.039–0.079 in) long. Each pinna has two pairs of pinnules, the outer pinnules narrowly oblong, 5–12 mm (0.20–0.47 in) long, 1.5–5 mm (0.059–0.197 in) wide, flat or slightly curved, green and glabrous. There are stipules 2.5–4 mm (0.098–0.157 in) long at the base of the leaves and a prominent sessile gland on the rachis at the base of the pinnae and smaller glands at the base of the uppermost one or two pairs of pinnules. The flower are borne in up to three axils spherical heads on glabrous peduncles 10–20 mm (0.39–0.79 in) long, the heads large with 28 to 35 light golden yellow flowers. Flowering occurs from March or May to November, and the pods are 30–40 mm (1.2–1.6 in) long, 6–8 mm (0.24–0.31 in) wide and glabrous. The seeds are oblong to elliptic and 2–3 mm (0.079–0.118 in) long.

== Taxonomy ==
Acacia leioderma was first formally described in 1975 by Bruce Maslin in the journal Nuytsia from specimens he collected 21 km (13 mi) from Denmark towards Mount Barker in 1972. The specific epithet (leioderma) means 'smooth skin' referring to the smooth branches.

== Distribution and habitat ==
This species of wattle grows near watercourses and swamps, and on granite outcrops in sandy loam and on laterite, mostly in coastal heath, scrub and shrubland from the Mount Barker - Albany area and east to Fitzgerald River National Park, in the Esperance Plains, Jarrah Forest and Warren bioregions of south-western Western Australia.

== Conservation status ==
Acacia leioderma is listed as 'not threatened' by the Government of Western Australia Department of Biodiversity, Conservation and Attractions. Acacia leioderma is one of the main understorey species found in open forest on the lower slopes of the Porongurup Range.

== See also ==
- List of Acacia species
