= Barbara York Main =

Australian arachnologist and professor (1929–2019)

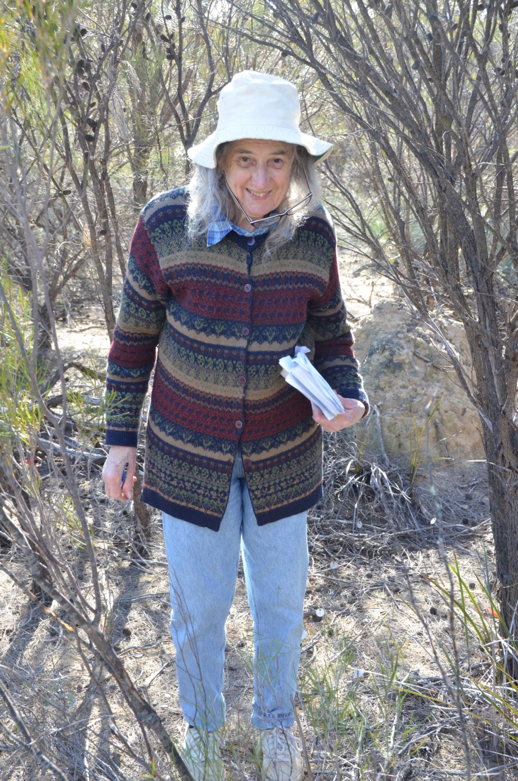
- Main in the North Bungulla Nature Reserve, Western Australia, 2015
- Born: 27 January 1929; Kellerberrin, Western Australia
- Died: 14 May 2019 (aged 90)
- Education: PhD, zoology, University of Western Australia, 1956
- Known for: Study of arachnids
- Spouse: Bert Main (m. 1952–2009)
- Children: 3
- Awards: Medal of the Order of Australia
- Scientific career
- Fields: Arachnology
- Workplaces: University of Western Australia
- Thesis: A comparative study of the evolution of the Araneae as illustrated by the biology of the Aganippini (Mygalomorphae: Ctenizidae)

Barbara Anne York Main OAM (27 January 1929 – 14 May 2019) was an Australian arachnologist and adjunct professor at the University of Western Australia. The author of four books and over 90 research papers, Main is recognised for her prolific work in establishing taxonomy for arachnids, personally describing 34 species and seven new genera. The BBC and ABC produced a film about her work, Lady of the Spiders, in 1981.

With research interests that include the natural history and taxonomy of mygalomorph spiders, Main is noted for having studied the oldest known spider, a Gaius villosus trapdoor spider she named "Number 16", from its birth in 1974 to its death in 2016.

Main is also recognised for her writing about the environment. Two of her books, Between Wodjil and Tor (1967) and Twice Trodden Ground (1971), have been described as "classic studies" of the cost to the environment of developing the wheatbelt in Western Australia. Main remained active in the research community until she retired in 2017 at the age of 88.

== Biography ==
=== Early life ===
Main was born in hospital in Kellerberrin, Western Australia, the fourth child of Gladys York (née Tobias) and Gerald Henry "Harry" York. The children, four boys and a girl, grew up on a farm in the nearby Shire of Tammin, in two rooms in a mud-brick house. Main's parents had married in 1921. Her mother was born in Coolgardie and had worked as one of two teachers in a school in Yorkrakine, and her father was a farmer who had emigrated in 1909 from Yorkshire in England.

Main's early life was spent in what Australians know as "Wodjil country", areas of the wheatbelt region of Western Australia known for its acidic sand, surrounded by Acacia victoriae, sheoak plants and York gum trees. She told ABC Radio National: "I felt an immediate affinity with small things, not kangaroos or wedge-tailed eagles—I didn’t have that one-on-one relationship with a kangaroo that I could with caterpillars! So I'd keep them and feed them in boxes and watch them turn into butterflies." She wrote about the area and its destruction in her second book, Between Wodjil and Tor (1967).

=== Education ===
Main and her brothers attended a bush school, which Main left after two years to study at home through correspondence courses arranged by the Western Australian Education Department. She later attended Northam High School on a scholarship, boarding with a woman who looked after other students, then from 1947 the University of Western Australia (UWA) to study science, with a major in zoology. In 1952, Main became the first woman to study at UWA for a PhD in zoology; she received her PhD in 1956 for a thesis entitled A comparative study of the evolution of the Araneae as illustrated by the biology of the Aganippini (Mygalomorphae: Ctenizidae).

=== Marriage ===
In 1952, she married the Australian zoologist Bert Main; they met at UWA, received their PhDs in the same year, and remained married until his death in 2009. The couple had three children, Rebecca, Gilbert and Monica. Main was pregnant with her first child when she was awarded her PhD. She stayed at home to look after the children, while also working on various research projects, which included writing her first two books, Spiders of Australia (1962) and Between Wodjil and Tor (1967).

== Career ==
Before starting her PhD, Main worked as a junior lecturer at the University of Otago in Dunedin, New Zealand. In 1958, two years after receiving her PhD, Main received an Alice Hamilton Fellowship from the International Federation of University Women to spend six months studying spider collections in London at the British Museum/Natural History Museum and at the Oxford University Museum of Natural History. She engaged in field work in California, Arizona and Texas, also in 1958, and visited spider collections in the American Museum of Natural History, the Smithsonian, and the Museum of Comparative Zoology, while her husband was in the United States on a Carnegie Travelling Fellowship.

Bert Main became Professor of Zoology at UWA and, by 1960, the couple had set up home in Claremont. Main became an honorary lecturer in zoology at UWA in 1979, and later a senior honorary research fellow. In 1981, the BBC and ABC produced a documentary about her, Lady of the Spiders, narrated by David Attenborough and filmed by Jim Frazier and Densey Clyne, which discussed the 1,200 trapdoor spiders Main had been visiting and monitoring for the previous 12 years.

== Recognition ==
=== Awards and honours ===
Main was awarded the Medal of the Order of Australia in January 2011 for "service to science and conservation as a researcher and educator in the field of arachnology, and to the community of Western Australia". The award was announced in the 2011 Australia Day Honours List. She was also an honorary member of the International Society of Arachnology. In 2018 Main was awarded the Medal of the Royal Society of Western Australia, the first woman to win it since the award began in 1924.

=== Species and genera named in her honour ===
Spiders

- Mainosa mainae (McKay, 1979)
- Tasmanoonops mainae (Forster & Platnick, 1985)
- Zephyrarchaea mainae (Platnick, 1991)
- Tamopsis mainae (Baehr & Baehr, 1993)
- Nicodamus mainae (Harvey, 1995)
- Pediana mainae (Hirst, 1995)
- Storena mainae (Jocqué & Baehr, 1995)
- Megaloastia mainae (Zabka, 1995)
- Hersilia mainae (Baehr & Baehr, 1995)
- Aname mainae (Raven, 2000)
- Boolathana mainae (Platnick, 2002)
- Arbanitis yorkmainae (Wishart & Rowell, 2008)
- Atrax yorkmainorum (Gray, 2010)
- Missulena mainae (Miglio, Harms, Framenau & Harvey, 2014)

Other arachnids

- Apozomus mainae (Harvey, 1992) (schizomid)
- Barbaraella mainae (Harvey, 1995) (pseudoscorpion)
- Hypoaspis barbarae (Strong, 1995) (mite)
- Hesperopilio mainae (Shear, 1996) (harvestman)
- Miobunus mainae (Hunt, 1995) (harvestman)

Insects

- Adelotopus mainae (Baehr, 1997) (beetle)
- Ceratobaeus mainae (Austin, 1995) (wasp)

Millipedes

- Atelomastix mainae (Edward & Harvey, 2010)

GENERA

- Bymainiella (Raven, 1978) (spider)
- Barbaraella (Harvey, 1995) (pseudoscorpion)
- Mainosa (Framenau, 2006) (spider)

== Selected works ==
=== Books, essays ===
- (1962). Spiders of Australia. Brisbane: Jacaranda Press.
- (1967). Between Wodjil and Tor. Brisbane: Jacaranda Press.
- (1971). Twice Trodden Ground. Brisbane: Jacaranda Press.
- (1972). "Marginal Country", Westerly, 17(2), June 1972, pp. 21–36.
- (1976). Spiders. Sydney: Collins (Australian Naturalist Library series).
- (1979, Alec Choate and Barbara York Main (eds.). Summerland. Perth: UWA Publishing.

=== Papers ===
Main had over 90 research papers published, including:

- Main, B. Y. (1952). "Notes on the genus Idiosoma, a supposedly rare Western Australian trapdoor spider". Western Australian Naturalist 3: 130–137.
- Main, B. Y. (1954). Spiders and Opiliones. Part 6 of The Archipelago of the Recherche. Australian Geographical Society Reports 1: 37–53.
- Main, B. Y. (1956). Observations on the burrow and natural history of the trapdoor spider Missulena (Ctenizidae). Western Australian Naturalist 5: 73–80.
- Main, B. Y. (1956). Taxonomy and biology of the genus Isometroides Keyserling (Scorpionida). Australian Journal of Zoology 4: 158–164.
- Main, B. Y. and Main, A. R (1956). Spider predator on a vertebrate. Western Australian Naturalist 5: 139.
- Main, B. Y. (1957). Occurrence of the trapdoor spider Conothele malayana (Doleschall) in Australia (Mygalomorphae: Ctenizidae). Western Australian Naturalist 5: 209–216.
- Main, B. Y. (1957). Adaptive radiation of trapdoor spiders. Australian Museum Magazine 12: 160–3.
- Main, B. Y. (1957). Biology of Aganippine trapdoor spiders (Mygalomorphae: Ctenizidae). Australian Journal of Zoology 5: 402–473.
- Butler, W. H. and Main, B. Y. (1959). Predation on vertebrates by mygalomorph spiders. Western Australian Naturalist 7: 52.
- Main, Barbara York (1960). "The genus Cethegus thorell (Mygalomorphae: Macrothelinae)". Journal of the Royal Society of Western Australia, 43: 30–34.
- Harvey, Mark S.; Main, Barbara York; Rix, Michael G.; and Cooper, Steven J. B. (2015). "Refugia within refugia: in situ speciation and conservation of threatened Bertmainius (Araneae: Migidae), a new genus of relictual trapdoor spiders endemic to the mesic zone of south-western Australia". Invertebrate systematics, 29(6), 511–553.
- Mason, Leanda Denise; Wardell-Johnson, Grant; and Main, Barbara York (2016). "Quality not quantity: conserving species of low mobility and dispersal capacity in south-western Australian urban remnants". Pacific Conservation Biology, 22(1), 37–47.
- Mason, Leanda Denise; Wardell-Johnson, Grant; and Main, Barbara York. (2018). "The longest-lived spider: mygalomorphs dig deep, and persevere". Pacific Conservation Biology, 24(2), 203–206.
- Harvey, Mark S.; Hillyer, Mia J.; Main, Barbara York, et al. (2018). "Phylogenetic relationships of the Australasian open-holed trapdoor spiders (Araneae: Mygalomorphae: Nemesiidae: Anaminae): multi-locus molecular analyses resolve the generic classification of a highly diverse fauna]. Zoological Journal of the Linnean Society. zlx111. doi:10.1093/zoolinnean/zlx111
