= A. lepidus =

A. lepidus may refer to:

- Acusilas lepidus, an orb-weaver spider species found in Myanmar
- Argyrodes lepidus, a tangle web spider species

== See also ==
- Lepidus (disambiguation)
