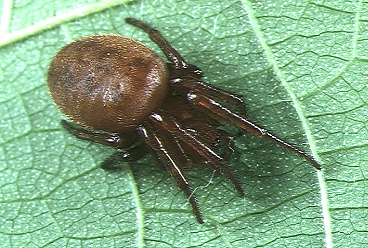
- Female
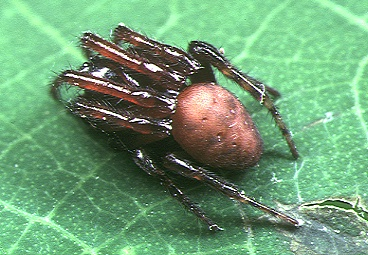
- Male

Scientific classification
- Kingdom: Animalia
- Phylum: Arthropoda
- Subphylum: Chelicerata
- Class: Arachnida
- Order: Araneae
- Infraorder: Araneomorphae
- Family: Araneidae
- Genus: Acusilas
- Species: A. coccineus

Binomial name
- Acusilas coccineus Simon, 1895

Synonyms
- Phonognatha vicitra Sherriffs, 1928; Acusilas gentingensis Murphy & Murphy, 1983

= Acusilas coccineus =

Species of spider

Acusilas coccineus is a species of spider in the family Araneidae, found from India and China to Indonesia (the Moluccas). In India particularly, it has been known by the synonym Phonognatha vicitra Sherriffs, 1928, but this is based on a misidentification. In India, it is found in woodlands and among shrubs. It is a small orb-weaver.

The spider is distinguished by having a curled leaf at the center of its web, in which it shelters. The curled leaf also shelters eggs.

== Appearance ==
The body length varies from 5mm up to 10mm. Their bodies are fat and oval shaped with long tapered legs.

== Web ==
The web, with its shelter at the center is easily identifiable. The leaf curling spider cleverly weaves a leaf or another object into the center of its web as a hide-away from predators. Leaves are twisted along the length to form a funnel. It is an incomplete circle, being open at the top and fanning downwards. The spider uses supporting threads attached to a shrub to suspend its curled-up dry leaf, with the fan-like main web radiating out from the leaf in which the spider hides, with only the tips of its legs visible, feeling for the vibrations of insects colliding with the web. It only leaves its shelter if the prey is stuck in the web, or if the web needs repair. Like other orb weavers, the spider usually rebuilds its web at night.

== Distribution ==
Acusilas coccineus is found from India and China to Indonesia (the Moluccas). Only a few observation in India are known to exist since W.R. Sherriffs in 1928. The spider is commonly found in open woodland and forest habitats.

== Behavior ==
Its fangs are small and the spider is timid. Toxicity to humans in unknown. The leaf curling spiders are day-active orb weavers, protecting themselves from predators by hiding inside the shelter. Such leaves may already be partly curled though many are not, and the spider pulls and silks its leaf into a retreat cylinder, silken shut at the top and open at the hub.
