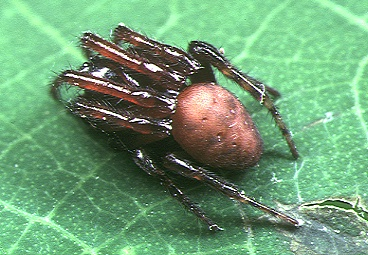
- male Acusilas coccineus
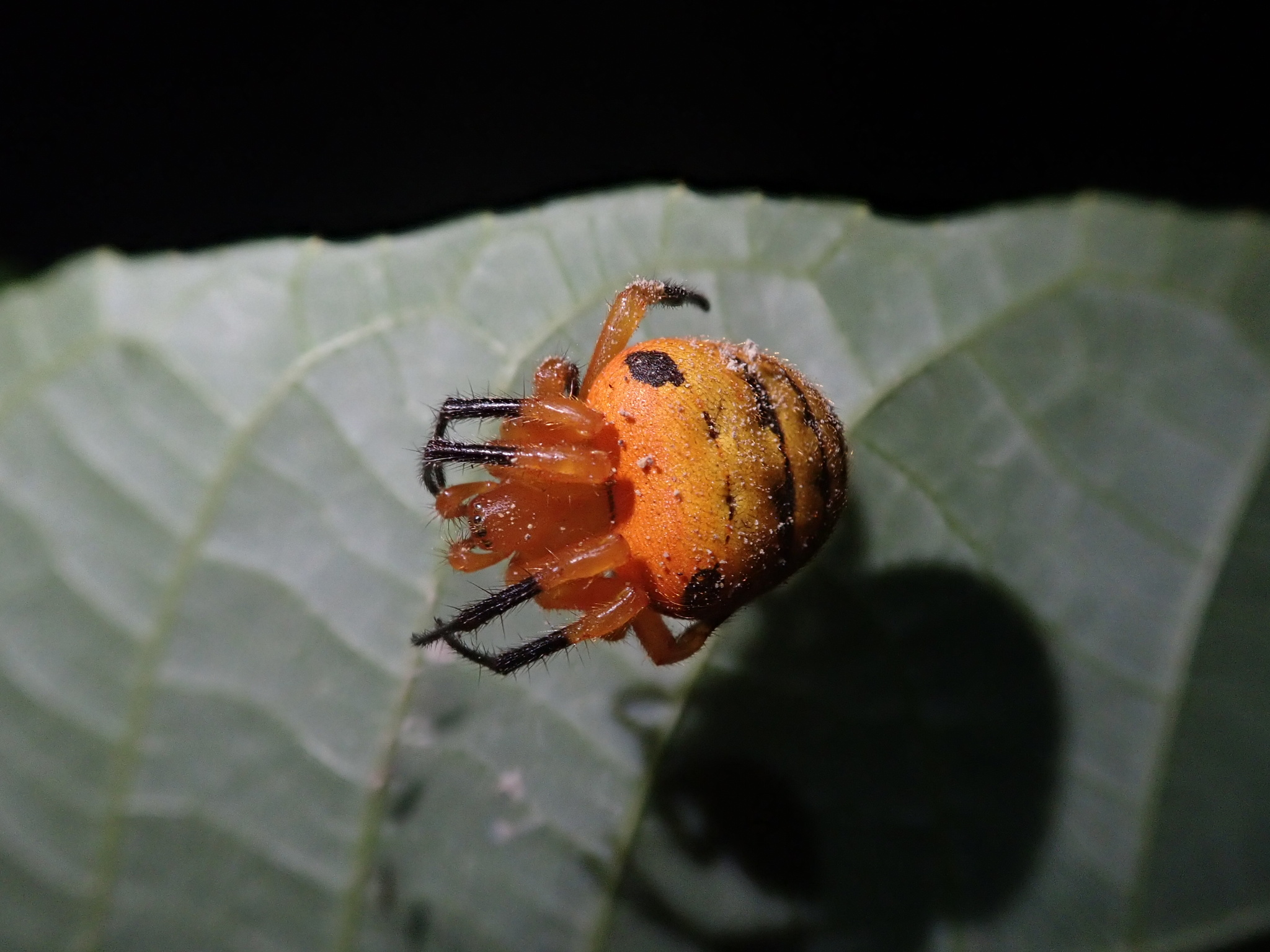
- A. malaccensis

Scientific classification
- Kingdom: Animalia
- Phylum: Arthropoda
- Subphylum: Chelicerata
- Class: Arachnida
- Order: Araneae
- Infraorder: Araneomorphae
- Family: Araneidae
- Genus: Acusilas; Simon, 1895

Type species
- A. coccineus Simon, 1895

Species
- 10, see text

= Acusilas =

Genus of spiders

Acusilas is a genus of orb-weaver spiders first described by Eugène Simon in 1895. Most species are found from India to Sulawesi, with A. africanus found in Africa.

== Life style ==
Acusilas build regular vertical orb-webs which incorporates a rolled leaf in the center.

== Description ==
These spiders are small to medium-sized, measuring between 2.50 and 14.00 mm, with males typically being much smaller than females.

The carapace features a narrow cephalic region and displays a prominent groove between the thorax and cephalothorax regions in females, though this groove is absent in males. The abdomen is longer than it is wide and extends beyond the spinnerets. The abdominal folium contains four lobes at its anterior end.

The anterior median eyes are positioned closer to the anterior lateral eyes than they are to each other.

== Species ==
As of October 2026, this genus includes ten species:

- Acusilas africanus Simon, 1895 – Sierra Leone, Cameroon, DR Congo, Gabon, Tanzania, South Africa
- Acusilas callidus Schmidt & Scharff, 2008 – Indonesia (Sulawesi)
- Acusilas coccineus Simon, 1895 – India, China, Indonesia (Moluccas) (type species)
- Acusilas dahoneus Barrion & Litsinger, 1995 – Philippines
- Acusilas lepidus (Thorell, 1898) – Myanmar
- Acusilas malaccensis J. Murphy & F. Murphy, 1983 – China, Laos, Thailand, Malaysia (Borneo), Indonesia (Sumatra, Borneo)
- Acusilas spiralis Schmidt & Scharff, 2008 – Indonesia (Sumatra)
- Acusilas tongi Mi & Li, 2021 – China
- Acusilas vei Schmidt & Scharff, 2008 – Indonesia (Sulawesi)
- Acusilas vilei Schmidt & Scharff, 2008 – Indonesia (Sulawesi)
