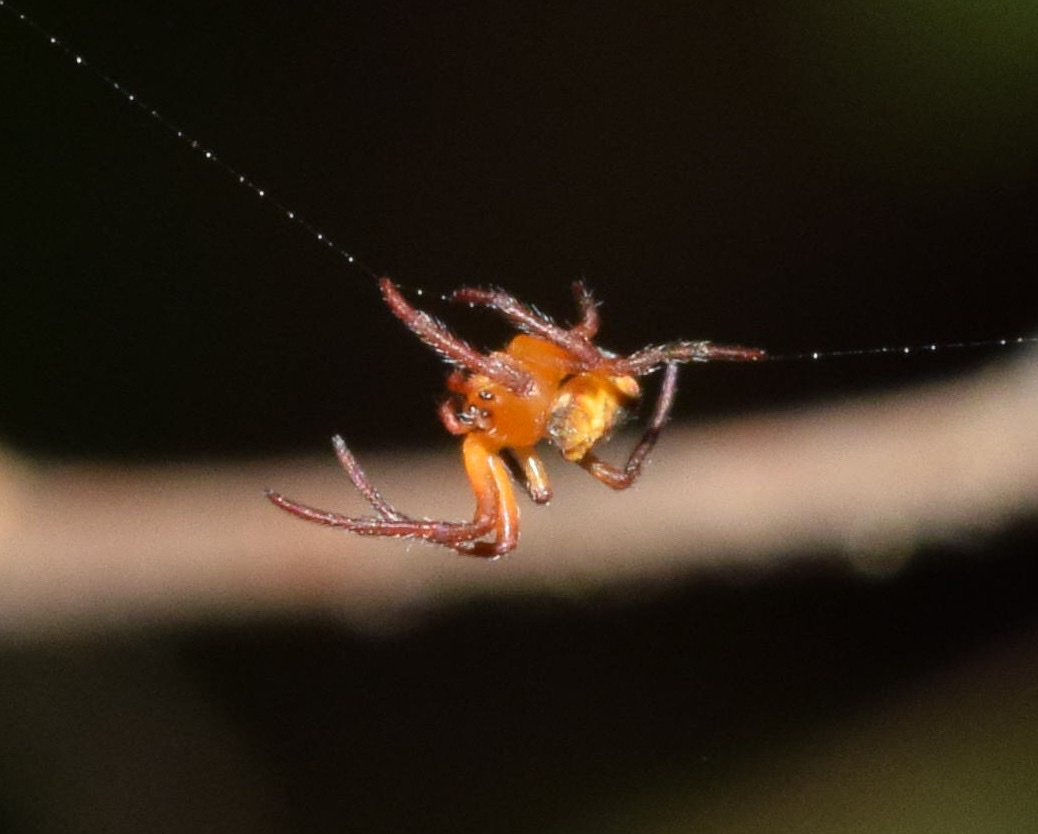

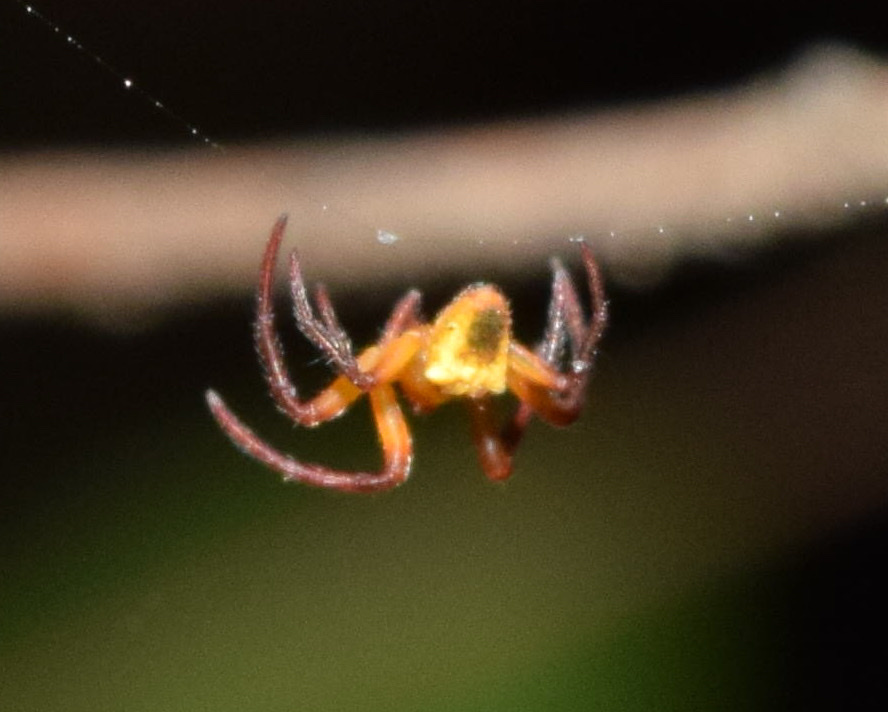

Scientific classification
- Kingdom: Animalia
- Phylum: Arthropoda
- Subphylum: Chelicerata
- Class: Arachnida
- Order: Araneae
- Infraorder: Araneomorphae
- Family: Araneidae
- Genus: Acusilas
- Species: A. africanus

Binomial name
- Acusilas africanus Simon, 1895

= Acusilas africanus =

African Rolled Leaf Orb-Web Spider

Species of spider

Acusilas africanus is a species of spider in the family Araneidae, the only African species of its genus. It is found from Cameroon to Tanzania and South Africa and is commonly known as the African rolled leaf orb-web spider.

== Distribution ==
Acusilas africanus has been recorded from Sierra Leone, Cameroon, Democratic Republic of the Congo, Gabon, and Tanzania. In South Africa, it occurs in the provinces of Eastern Cape, KwaZulu-Natal, and Limpopo.

== Habitat and ecology ==
The species is known to occur in leaf litter in coastal dunes and inhabits the Forest, Indian Ocean Coastal Belt, Savanna, and Thicket biomes. It is found at altitudes ranging from 16 to 1,930 m above sea level.

Acusilas africanus builds regular vertical orb-webs that incorporate a rolled leaf in the centre. The species is a web-dweller with nocturnal habits.

== Conservation ==
Acusilas africanus is listed as Least Concern by the South African National Biodiversity Institute due to its wide geographical range. In South Africa, it is protected in Ndumo Game Reserve and Makalali Nature Reserve.

== Taxonomy ==
The species was originally described by Eugène Simon in 1895 from Sierra Leone. It has been reviewed by Schmidt & Scharff (2008) and is known from both sexes.
