= Acusilas lepidus =

Scientific classification
- Kingdom: Animalia
- Phylum: Arthropoda
- Subphylum: Chelicerata
- Class: Arachnida
- Order: Araneae
- Infraorder: Araneomorphae
- Family: Araneidae
- Genus: Acusilas
- Species: A. lepidus

Binomial name
- Acusilas lepidus Thorell, 1898

Species of spider

Acusilas lepidus is a spider species in the genus Acusilas. It is found in Myanmar.
