= List of Eresidae species =

This page lists all described species of the spider family Eresidae accepted by the World Spider Catalog as of January 2021:

== Adonea ==
Adonea Simon, 1873

- A. algarvensis Wunderlich, 2017 — Portugal
- A. algerica (El-Hennawy, 2004) — Algeria, Israel
- A. fimbriata Simon, 1873 (type) — Algeria, Tunisia, Greece, Israel

== Dorceus ==
Dorceus

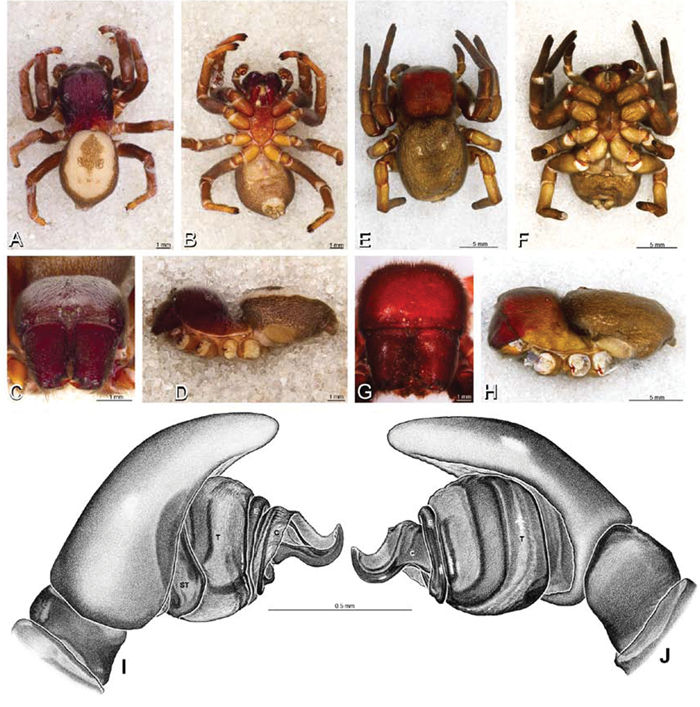
Dorceus fastuosus

Dorceus C. L. Koch, 1846

- D. albolunulatus (Simon, 1876) — Algeria
- D. fastuosus C. L. Koch, 1846 (type) — Tunisia, Senegal, Israel
- D. latifrons Simon, 1873 — Algeria, Tunisia
- D. quadrispilotus Simon, 1908 — Egypt
- D. trianguliceps Simon, 1911 — Tunisia

== Dresserus ==
Dresserus Simon, 1876

- D. aethiopicus Simon, 1909 — Ethiopia
- D. angusticeps Purcell, 1904 — South Africa
- D. armatus Pocock, 1901 — Uganda
- D. bilineatus Tullgren, 1910 — East Africa
- D. collinus Pocock, 1900 — South Africa
- D. colsoni Tucker, 1920 — South Africa
- D. darlingi Pocock, 1900 — South Africa
- D. elongatus Tullgren, 1910 — East Africa
- D. fontensis Lawrence, 1928 — Namibia
- D. fuscus Simon, 1876 (type) — East Africa, Zanzibar
- D. kannemeyeri Tucker, 1920 — South Africa
- D. laticeps Purcell, 1904 — South Africa
- D. murinus Lawrence, 1927 — Namibia
- D. namaquensis Purcell, 1908 — South Africa
- D. nigellus Tucker, 1920 — South Africa
- D. obscurus Pocock, 1898 — South Africa
- D. olivaceus Pocock, 1900 — South Africa
- D. rostratus Purcell, 1908 — Namibia
- D. schreineri Tucker, 1920 — South Africa
- D. schultzei Purcell, 1908 — Namibia
- D. sericatus Tucker, 1920 — South Africa
- D. subarmatus Tullgren, 1910 — East Africa, Botswana
- D. tripartitus Lawrence, 1938 — South Africa

== Eresus ==
Eresus

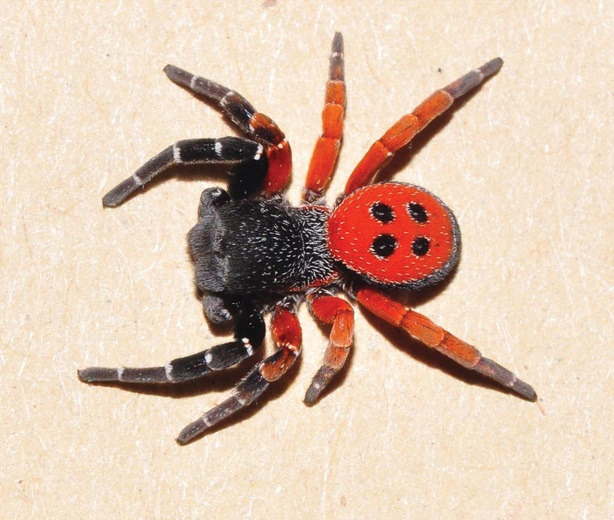
Eresus hermani, male

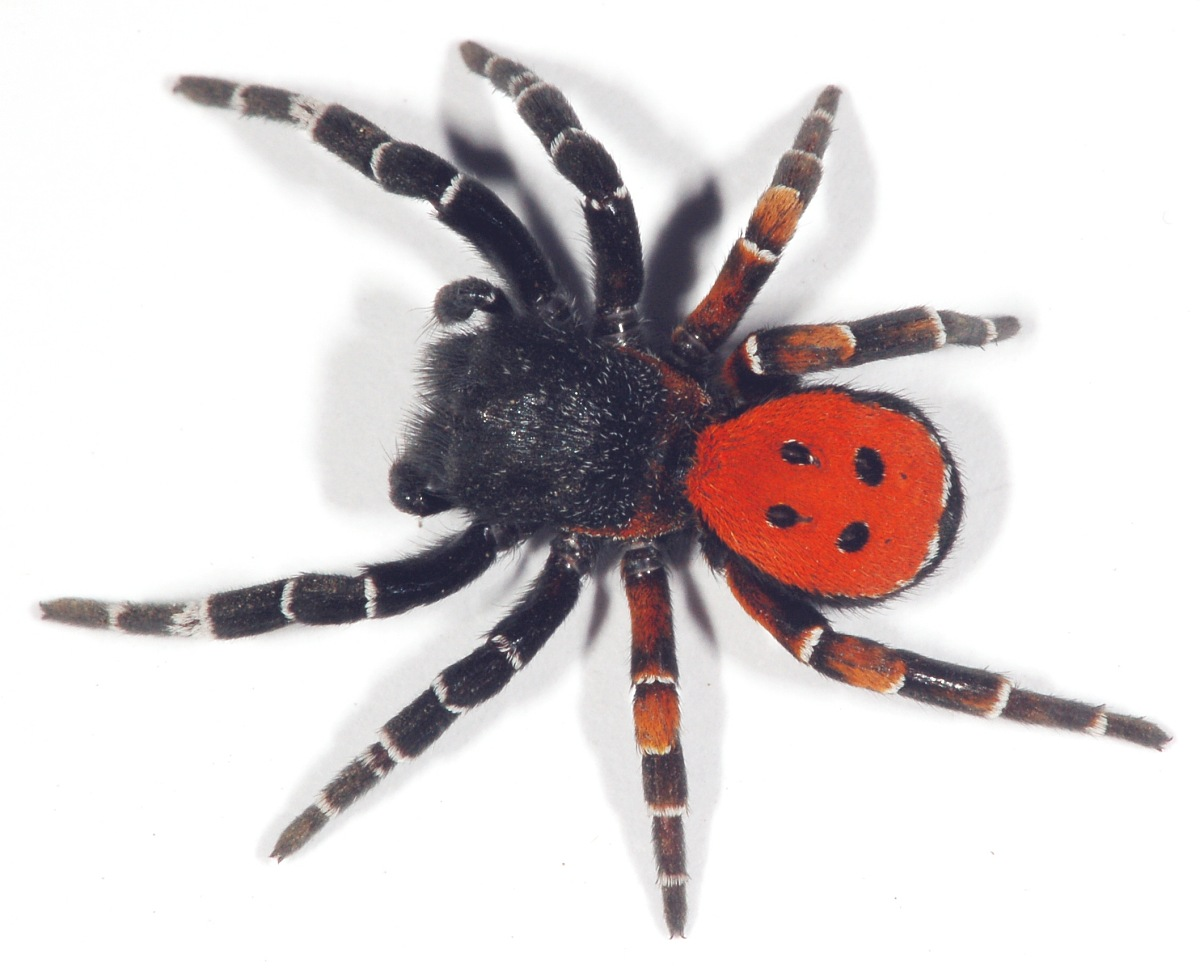
Eresus kollari

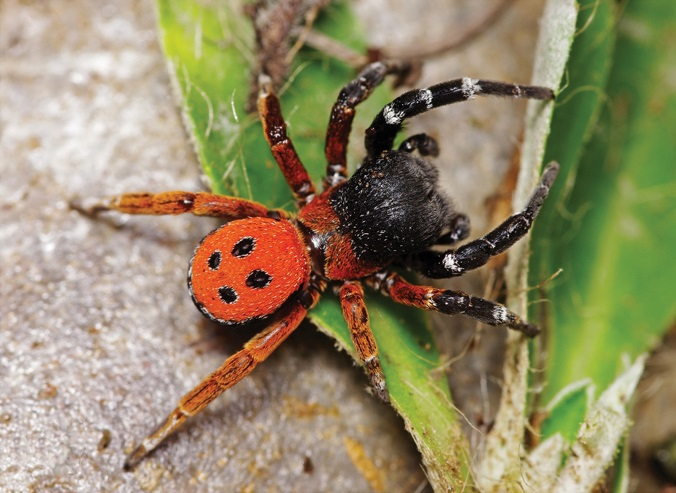
Eresus moravicus

Eresus Walckenaer, 1805

- E. adaleari Zamani & Szűts, 2020 — Iran
- E. albopictus Simon, 1873 — Italy (Sicily), Morocco?, Algeria?
- E. bifasciatus Ermolajev, 1937 — Russia (South Siberia)
- E. crassitibialis Wunderlich, 1987 — Canary Is.
- E. granosus Simon, 1895 — Russia (West Siberia), China
- E. hermani Kovács, Prazsák, Eichardt, Vári & Gyurkovics, 2015 — Hungary
- E. kollari Rossi, 1846 — Europe, Turkey, Caucasus, Iran, Russia (Europe, to Far East?), Central Asia?
  - E. k. frontalis Latreille, 1817 — Spain
  - E. k. ignicomis Simon, 1914 — France (Corsica)
  - E. k. latefasciatus Simon, 1911 — Algeria
  - E. k. tricolor Simon, 1873 — France (Corsica)
- E. lavrosiae Mcheidze, 1997 — Turkey, Georgia
- E. moravicus Řezáč, 2008 — Austria, Hungary, Czechia, Slovakia, Albania, Bulgaria, Greece
- E. pharaonis Walckenaer, 1837 — Egypt
- E. robustus Franganillo, 1918 — Spain
- E. rotundiceps Simon, 1873 — Ukraine, Turkmenistan
- E. ruficapillus C. L. Koch, 1846 — Italy (Sicily)
- E. sandaliatus (Martini & Goeze, 1778) — Europe
- E. sedilloti Simon, 1881 — Portugal, Spain
- E. solitarius Simon, 1873 — Mediterranean
- E. tristis Kroneberg, 1875 — Kazakhstan
- E. walckenaeri Brullé, 1832 — Mediterranean
  - E. w. moerens C. L. Koch, 1846 — Greece, Syria, Afghanistan

== Gandanameno ==
Gandanameno Lehtinen, 1967

- G. echinata (Purcell, 1908) — Namibia
- G. fumosa (C. L. Koch, 1837) — Namibia, South Africa
- G. inornata (Pocock, 1898) — Malawi
- G. purcelli (Tucker, 1920) — South Africa
- G. spenceri (Pocock, 1900) (type) — South Africa

== Loureedia ==
Loureedia

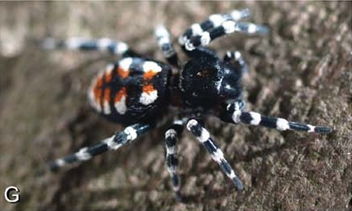
Loureedia annulipes, male

Loureedia Miller, Griswold, Scharff, Řezáč, Szűts & Marhabaie, 2012

- L. annulipes (Lucas, 1857) (type) — Algeria, Tunisia, Libya, Egypt, Israel
- L. colleni Henriques, Miñano & Pérez-Zarcos, 2018 — Spain
- L. lucasi (Simon, 1873) — Morocco, Algeria
- L. phoenixi Zamani & Marusik, 2020 — Iran

== Paradonea ==
Paradonea

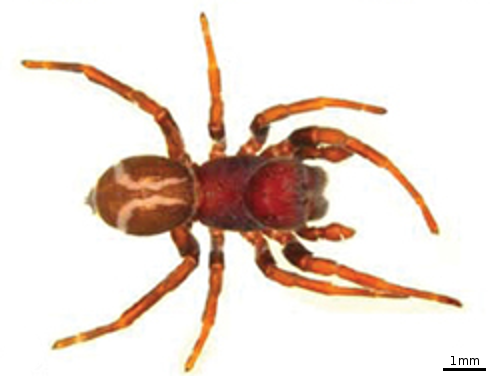
Paradonea presleyi

Paradonea Lawrence, 1968

- P. parva (Tucker, 1920) — Namibia, Botswana, South Africa
- P. presleyi Miller, Griswold, Scharff, Řezáč, Szűts & Marhabaie, 2012 — Zimbabwe, South Africa
- P. splendens (Lawrence, 1936) — Botswana, South Africa
- P. striatipes Lawrence, 1968 (type) — Namibia, South Africa
- P. variegata (Purcell, 1904) — Namibia, Botswana, South Africa

== Seothyra ==
Seothyra Purcell, 1903

- S. annettae Dippenaar-Schoeman, 1991 — Namibia
- S. barnardi Dippenaar-Schoeman, 1991 — Botswana
- S. dorstlandica Dippenaar-Schoeman, 1991 — Namibia
- S. fasciata Purcell, 1904 — Namibia, Botswana, South Africa
- S. griffinae Dippenaar-Schoeman, 1991 — Angola, Namibia
- S. henscheli Dippenaar-Schoeman, 1991 — Namibia
- S. longipedata Dippenaar-Schoeman, 1991 — Namibia, South Africa
- S. louwi Dippenaar-Schoeman, 1991 — Namibia
- S. neseri Dippenaar-Schoeman, 1991 — Namibia
- S. perelegans Simon, 1906 — South Africa
- S. roshensis Dippenaar-Schoeman, 1991 — Namibia
- S. schreineri Purcell, 1903 (type) — Namibia, South Africa
- S. semicoccinea Simon, 1906 — South Africa

== Stegodyphus ==
Stegodyphus

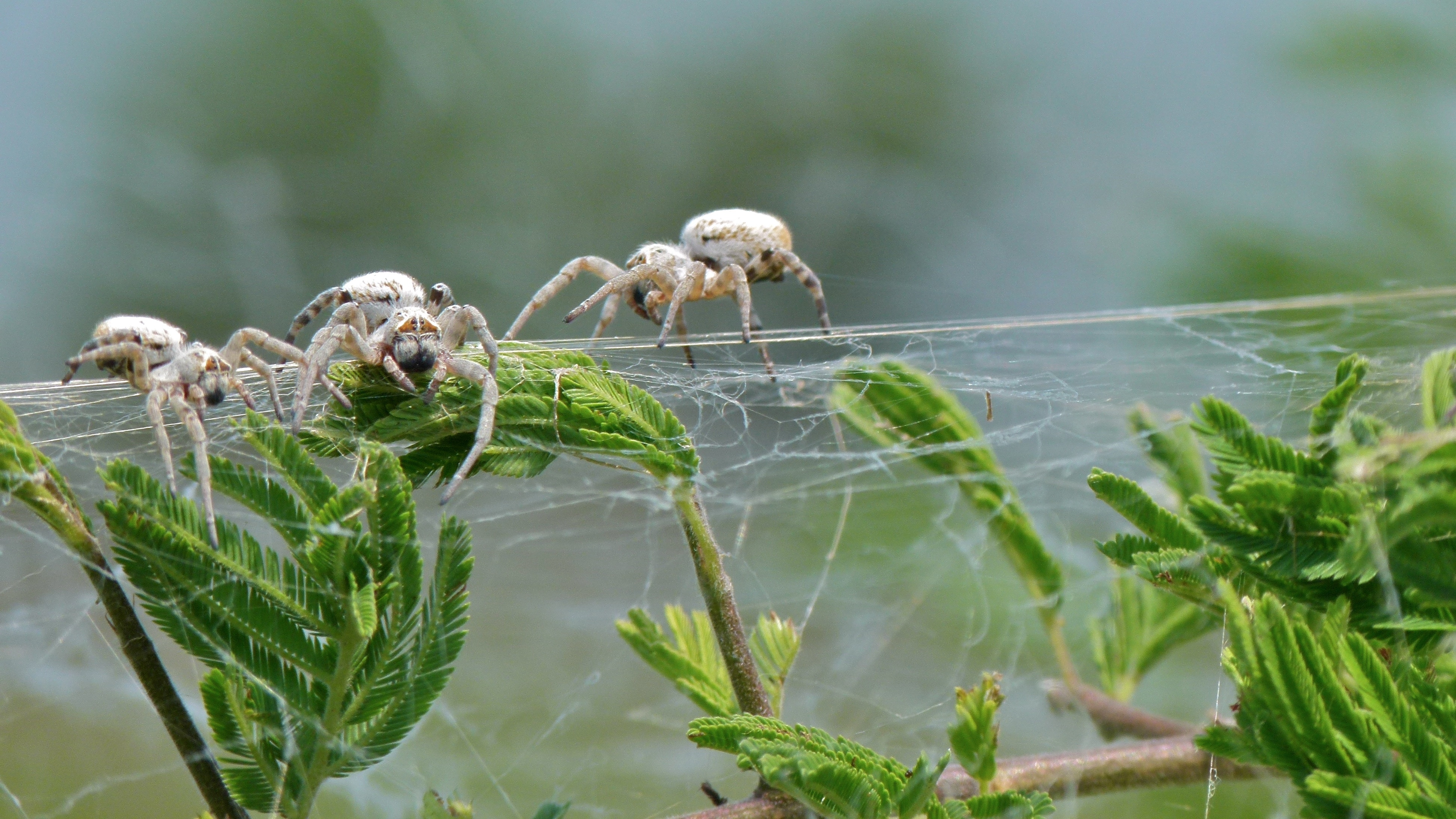
African social spider
(Stegodyphus dumicola)

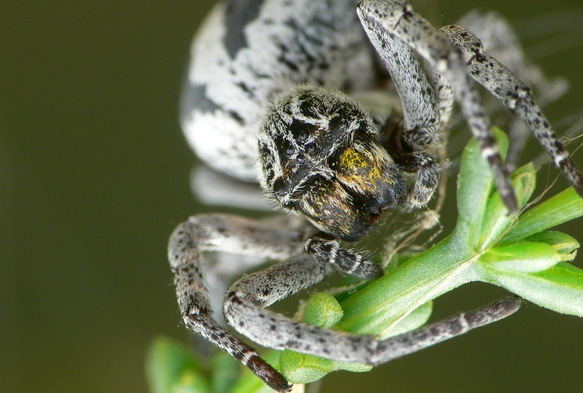
Stegodyphus lineatus

Stegodyphus Simon, 1873

- S. africanus (Blackwall, 1866) — Africa
- S. bicolor (O. Pickard-Cambridge, 1869) — Southern Africa
- S. dufouri (Audouin, 1826) — North, West Africa
- S. dumicola Pocock, 1898 — Central, Southern Africa
- S. hildebrandti (Karsch, 1878) — Central, East Africa, Zanzibar
- S. hisarensis Arora & Monga, 1992 — India
- S. lineatus (Latreille, 1817) (type) — Southern Europe, North Africa to Tajikistan
- S. lineifrons Pocock, 1898 — East Africa
- S. manaus Kraus & Kraus, 1992 — Brazil
- S. manicatus Simon, 1876 — North, West Africa
- S. mimosarum Pavesi, 1883 — Africa, Madagascar
- S. mirandus Pocock, 1899 — India
- S. nathistmus Kraus & Kraus, 1989 — Morocco to Yemen
- S. pacificus Pocock, 1900 — Jordan, Iran, Pakistan, India
- S. sabulosus Tullgren, 1910 — East, Southern Africa
- S. sarasinorum Karsch, 1892 — India, Sri Lanka, Nepal, Myanmar
- S. simplicifrons Simon, 1906 — Madagascar
- S. tentoriicola Purcell, 1904 — South Africa
- S. tibialis (O. Pickard-Cambridge, 1869) — India, Myanmar, Thailand, China
- S. tingelin Kraus & Kraus, 1989 — Cameroon
