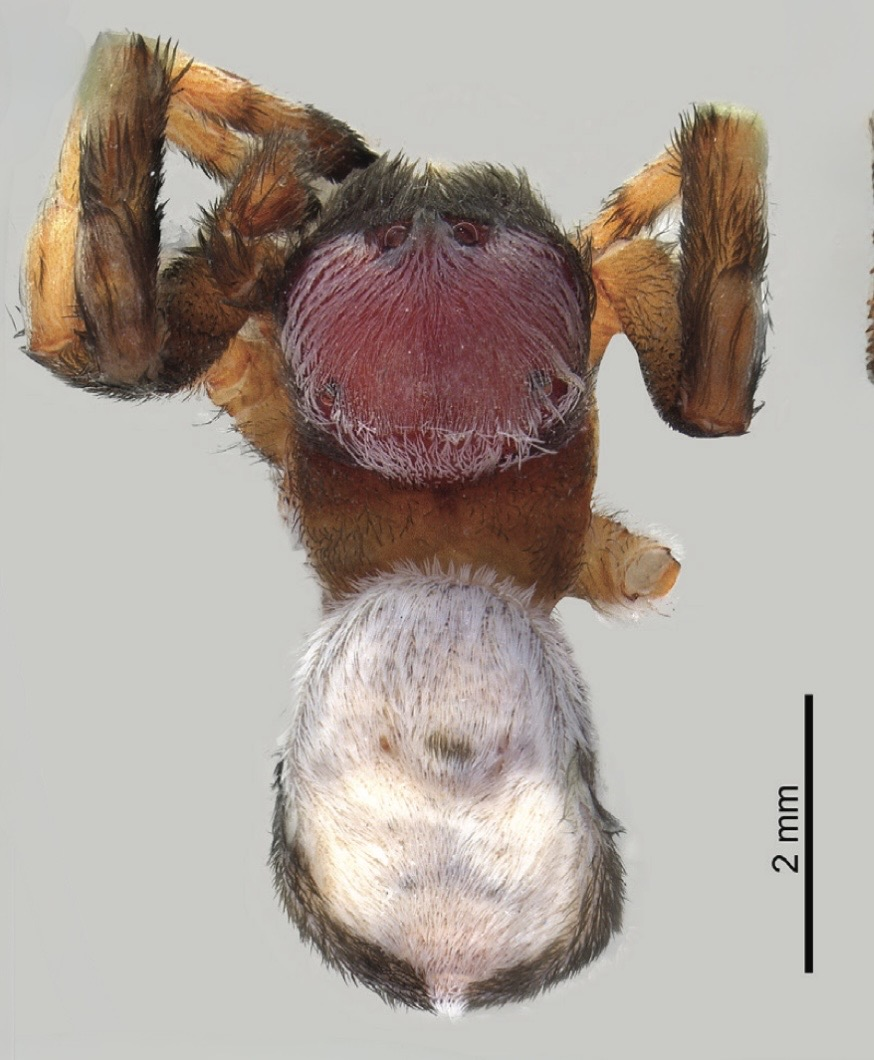

Scientific classification
- Kingdom: Animalia
- Phylum: Arthropoda
- Subphylum: Chelicerata
- Class: Arachnida
- Order: Araneae
- Infraorder: Araneomorphae
- Family: Eresidae
- Genus: Dorceus
- Species: D. saif

Binomial name
- Dorceus saif Szűts & Zamani, 2026

= Dorceus saif =

Species of spider

Dorceus saif is a species of velvet spider known only from the Eastern Province of northeastern Saudi Arabia. It is the only Dorceus species found Saudi Arabia.

== Description ==
The male holotype has a total body length of 5.75 millimeters. The carapace is 3.20 millimeters long, 2.20 millimeters wide, and 1.80 millimeters high. The integument of the carapace is yellow. The pars cephalica is entirely covered with white setae that extend down to the middle eyes. The chelicerae and the frontal side of the carapace below the middle eyes are densely covered with thick black setae. The pars thoracica has sparse black slender setae. The labium, sternum, and maxillae are pale brown.

The legs have mainly black setae on the femora and the proximal ends of the tibiae, with a few white setae on the proximal parts. The remaining parts of the legs have white setae. The abdomen is white on the dorsal surface and dark grey on the lateral and ventral surfaces. The spinnerets are dark grey.

The male palpal bulb has a spermophor that is slightly bent medially. The ejaculatory duct diverges from the base of the conductor. In lateral view, the conductor is a long and curved blade-shaped structure. The female of the species is unknown.

The male of Dorceus saif can be distinguished from most other species in the genus by its long conductor blade. It resembles Dorceus trianguliceps in having a strongly curved and broad conductor tip. It differs from that species in having a more protruding conductor blade and in the path of the ejaculatory duct, which diverges from the base of the conductor rather than running parallel to it. The coloration is also diagnostic. The cephalic area is entirely covered with white setae while the thoracic area lacks them, and the dorsal surface of the abdomen is white.

== Etymology ==
The specific epithet saif is an Arabic word meaning "sword". The name refers to the sword-like shape of the conductor in lateral view.

== Distribution ==
The species is known only from the type locality near the Aramco Tanajib Airport in the Eastern Province of Saudi Arabia.
