= Paradonea parva =

Decorated Velvet Spider

Conservation status
- Least Concern (SANBI Red List)

Scientific classification
- Kingdom: Animalia
- Phylum: Arthropoda
- Subphylum: Chelicerata
- Class: Arachnida
- Order: Araneae
- Infraorder: Araneomorphae
- Family: Eresidae
- Genus: Paradonea
- Species: P. parva

Binomial name
- Paradonea parva (Tucker, 1920)

Species of spider

Paradonea parva is a species of spider in the family Eresidae. It occurs in southern Africa and is commonly known as the decorated velvet spider.

== Distribution ==
Paradonea parva is found in Namibia, Botswana, and South Africa. In South Africa, it occurs in four provinces: Free State, Limpopo, Mpumalanga, Northern Cape, and North West.

== Habitat and ecology ==
The species inhabits Grassland and Savanna biomes at altitudes ranging from 116 to 1,394 m above sea level.

They build silken tubes under stones or under shrubs. Sometimes, spiders build a round web approximately 10 cm in diameter that may be covered with sand and herbal debris. The species is often collected by pitfall trapping.

== Description ==
Paradonea parva exhibits distinct sexual dimorphism in size and colour typical of the genus: Males have distinct colour patterns on the carapace and opisthosoma, while females display various hues of dark brown, yellowish brown, or grey with small dark abdominal spots.

The species is currently known only from males.

== Conservation ==
Paradonea parva is listed as Least Concern by the South African National Biodiversity Institute due to its wide geographical range across southern Africa. The species is protected in four protected areas including Blouberg Nature Reserve and Kruger National Park.

== Taxonomy ==
The species was originally described by Richard William Ethelbert Tucker in 1920 as Adonea parva from the junction of the Crocodile and Marico Rivers in Limpopo. It was later transferred to Paradonea by Lawrence in 1968.
