= Dresserus tripartitus =

Scientific classification
- Kingdom: Animalia
- Phylum: Arthropoda
- Subphylum: Chelicerata
- Class: Arachnida
- Order: Araneae
- Infraorder: Araneomorphae
- Family: Eresidae
- Genus: Dresserus
- Species: D. tripartitus

Binomial name
- Dresserus tripartitus Lawrence, 1938

Species of spider

Dresserus tripartitus is a species of spider in the family Eresidae. It is endemic to South Africa.

== Etymology ==
The species name tripartitus refers to the three-part structure of the cribellum, derived from Latin tri (three) and partitus (divided).

== Distribution ==
Dresserus tripartitus is endemic to the KwaZulu-Natal province of South Africa. The species is known only from the type locality of Pietermaritzburg.

== Habitat and ecology ==
The species is rare and found in retreat webs in the Savanna biome. It inhabits areas at an altitude of 647 m above sea level.

== Description ==
Dresserus tripartitus is known only from females. The opisthosoma is pale fawn in colour.

== Conservation ==
Dresserus tripartitus is listed as Data Deficient due to taxonomic reasons. The species has a very restricted range. The status remains obscure as males have not been collected, and more sampling is needed to determine the species' range.

== Taxonomy ==
The species was originally described by Reginald Frederick Lawrence in 1938 from Pietermaritzburg. It has not been revised since its original description and remains known only from the female sex.
