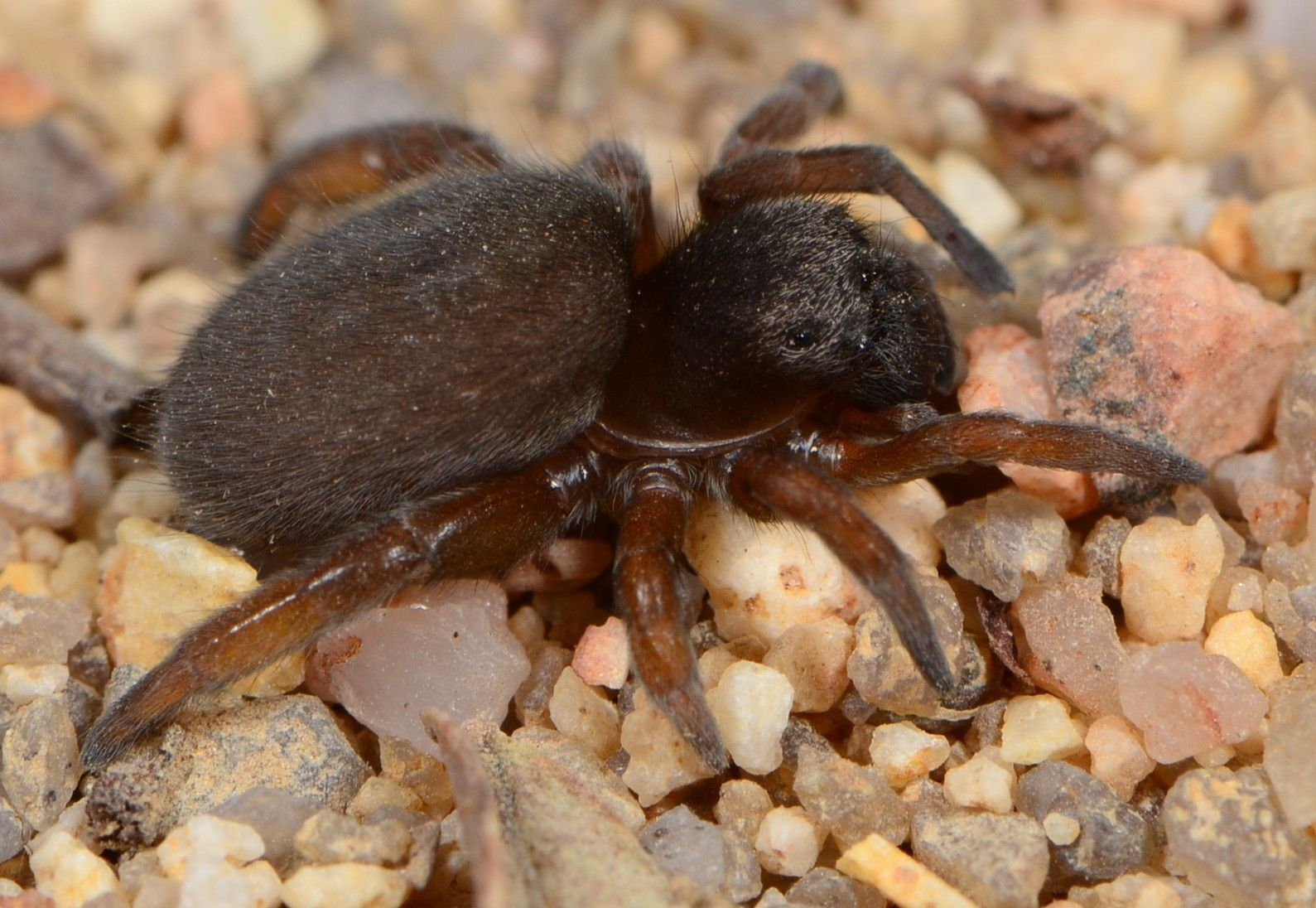
- juvenile female

Scientific classification
- Kingdom: Animalia
- Phylum: Arthropoda
- Subphylum: Chelicerata
- Class: Arachnida
- Order: Araneae
- Infraorder: Araneomorphae
- Family: Eresidae
- Genus: Dresserus
- Species: D. namaquensis

Binomial name
- Dresserus namaquensis Purcell, 1908

= Dresserus namaquensis =

Steinkopf Ground Velvet Spider

Species of spider

Dresserus namaquensis is a species of spider in the family Eresidae. It is endemic to South Africa and is commonly known as the Steinkopf ground velvet spider.

== Distribution ==
Dresserus namaquensis is endemic to the Northern Cape province of South Africa. The species has been recorded from Steinkopf, Kamaggas, and Richtersveld Transfrontier National Park.

== Habitat and ecology ==
The species is rare and found in retreat webs made under rocks in the Succulent Karoo biome. It inhabits areas at altitudes ranging from 231 to 870 m above sea level.

== Description ==
Dresserus namaquensis is known only from females. The opisthosoma is pale yellowish or smoky, clothed with black setae and uniform in colour.

== Conservation ==
Dresserus namaquensis is listed as Data Deficient due to taxonomic reasons. The status remains obscure as males have not been collected, and more sampling is needed to determine the species' range. The species is protected in Richtersveld Transfrontier National Park.

== Taxonomy ==
The species was originally described by William Frederick Purcell in 1908 from Steinkopf and Kamaggas. It has not been revised since its original description and remains known only from the female sex.
