= Dresserus angusticeps =

Scientific classification
- Kingdom: Animalia
- Phylum: Arthropoda
- Subphylum: Chelicerata
- Class: Arachnida
- Order: Araneae
- Infraorder: Araneomorphae
- Family: Eresidae
- Genus: Dresserus
- Species: D. angusticeps

Binomial name
- Dresserus angusticeps Purcell, 1904

Species of spider

Dresserus angusticeps is a species of spider in the family Eresidae. It is endemic to South Africa.

== Etymology ==
The species name angusticeps is derived from Latin angustus (narrow) and ceps (head).

== Distribution ==
Dresserus angusticeps is endemic to the Western Cape province of South Africa. The species has been recorded from two coastal localities: St Helena Bay and Brands-se-Baai.

== Habitat and ecology ==
The species is a ground dweller that constructs retreat webs and is found mainly under stones in the Fynbos biome. It inhabits coastal areas at altitudes ranging from 84 to 109 m above sea level.

== Description ==
Dresserus angusticeps is known only from females. The opisthosoma is speckled with white setae above, and spots form lines of white setae at the sides.

== Conservation ==
Dresserus angusticeps is listed as Data Deficient due to taxonomic reasons. The species has a very restricted range. The status remains obscure as males have not been collected, and more sampling is needed to determine the species' full range. The species is threatened by habitat loss due to farming activities in the St Helena Bay area.

== Taxonomy ==
The species was originally described by William Frederick Purcell in 1904 from St Helena Bay in the Western Cape. It has not been revised since its original description and remains known only from the female sex.
