= Paradonea striatipes =

Black and White Velvet Spider

Conservation status
- Least Concern (SANBI Red List)

Scientific classification
- Kingdom: Animalia
- Phylum: Arthropoda
- Subphylum: Chelicerata
- Class: Arachnida
- Order: Araneae
- Infraorder: Araneomorphae
- Family: Eresidae
- Genus: Paradonea
- Species: P. striatipes

Binomial name
- Paradonea striatipes Lawrence, 1968

Species of spider

Paradonea striatipes is a species of spider in the family Eresidae. It occurs in southern Africa and is commonly known as the black and white velvet spider.

== Etymology ==
The species epithet "striatipes" combines Latin "striatus" (striped) and "pes" (foot).

== Distribution ==
Paradonea striatipes is found in Namibia and South Africa. In South Africa, it occurs in the Northern Cape province.

== Habitat and ecology ==
The species inhabits Savanna biomes at altitudes ranging from 1,238 to 1,326 m above sea level.

The species is a ground-dweller that builds silken tube-like nests under stones or under shrubs.

== Description ==
The species is currently known only from males.

== Conservation ==
Paradonea striatipes is listed as Least Concern by the South African National Biodiversity Institute due to its wide southern African geographical range. Additional sampling is needed to collect females and better understand the species' biology.

== Taxonomy ==
The species was described by Lawrence in 1968 from Namibia and serves as the type species for the genus Paradonea. It was revised by Miller et al. in 2012.
