= Dresserus obscurus =

Scientific classification
- Kingdom: Animalia
- Phylum: Arthropoda
- Subphylum: Chelicerata
- Class: Arachnida
- Order: Araneae
- Infraorder: Araneomorphae
- Family: Eresidae
- Genus: Dresserus
- Species: D. obscurus

Binomial name
- Dresserus obscurus Pocock, 1898

Species of spider

Dresserus obscurus is a species of spider in the family Eresidae. It is endemic to South Africa.

== Distribution ==
Dresserus obscurus is endemic to the KwaZulu-Natal province of South Africa. The species has been recorded from Estcourt and Richards Bay.

== Habitat and ecology ==
The species is rare and found in retreat webs made under rocks in the Grassland and Savanna biomes. It inhabits areas at altitudes ranging from 29 to 1,189 m above sea level.

== Description ==
Dresserus obscurus is known only from females. The whole body is mouse-brown and covered with greyish-black setae.

== Conservation ==
Dresserus obscurus is listed as Data Deficient due to taxonomic reasons. The species has a very restricted range. The status remains obscure as males have not been collected, and more sampling is needed to determine the species' range.

== Taxonomy ==
The species was originally described by Reginald Innes Pocock in 1898 from Estcourt. It has not been revised since its original description and remains known only from the female sex.
