= Dresserus collinus =

Scientific classification
- Kingdom: Animalia
- Phylum: Arthropoda
- Subphylum: Chelicerata
- Class: Arachnida
- Order: Araneae
- Infraorder: Araneomorphae
- Family: Eresidae
- Genus: Dresserus
- Species: D. collinus

Binomial name
- Dresserus collinus Pocock, 1900

Species of spider

Dresserus collinus is a species of spider in the family Eresidae. It is endemic to South Africa.

== Distribution ==
Dresserus collinus is endemic to the Western Cape province of South Africa. The species has been recorded from four protected areas: De Hoop Nature Reserve, Table Mountain National Park, Bontebok National Park, and Napier.

== Habitat and ecology ==
The species is found in retreat webs, mainly under stones in the Fynbos biome. It inhabits areas at altitudes ranging from 9 to 266 m above sea level.

== Description ==
Dresserus collinus is known only from females. The opisthosoma is grey with pale spots, and the posterior median eyes are large and separated from the anterior lateral eyes.

== Conservation ==
Dresserus collinus is listed as Data Deficient due to taxonomic reasons. Its status remains obscure as males have not been collected, and more sampling is needed to determine the species' range. The species is protected in De Hoop Nature Reserve, Bontebok National Park, and Table Mountain National Park.

== Taxonomy ==
The species was originally described by Reginald Innes Pocock in 1900 from Table Mountain National Park. It has not been revised since its original description and remains known only from the female sex.
