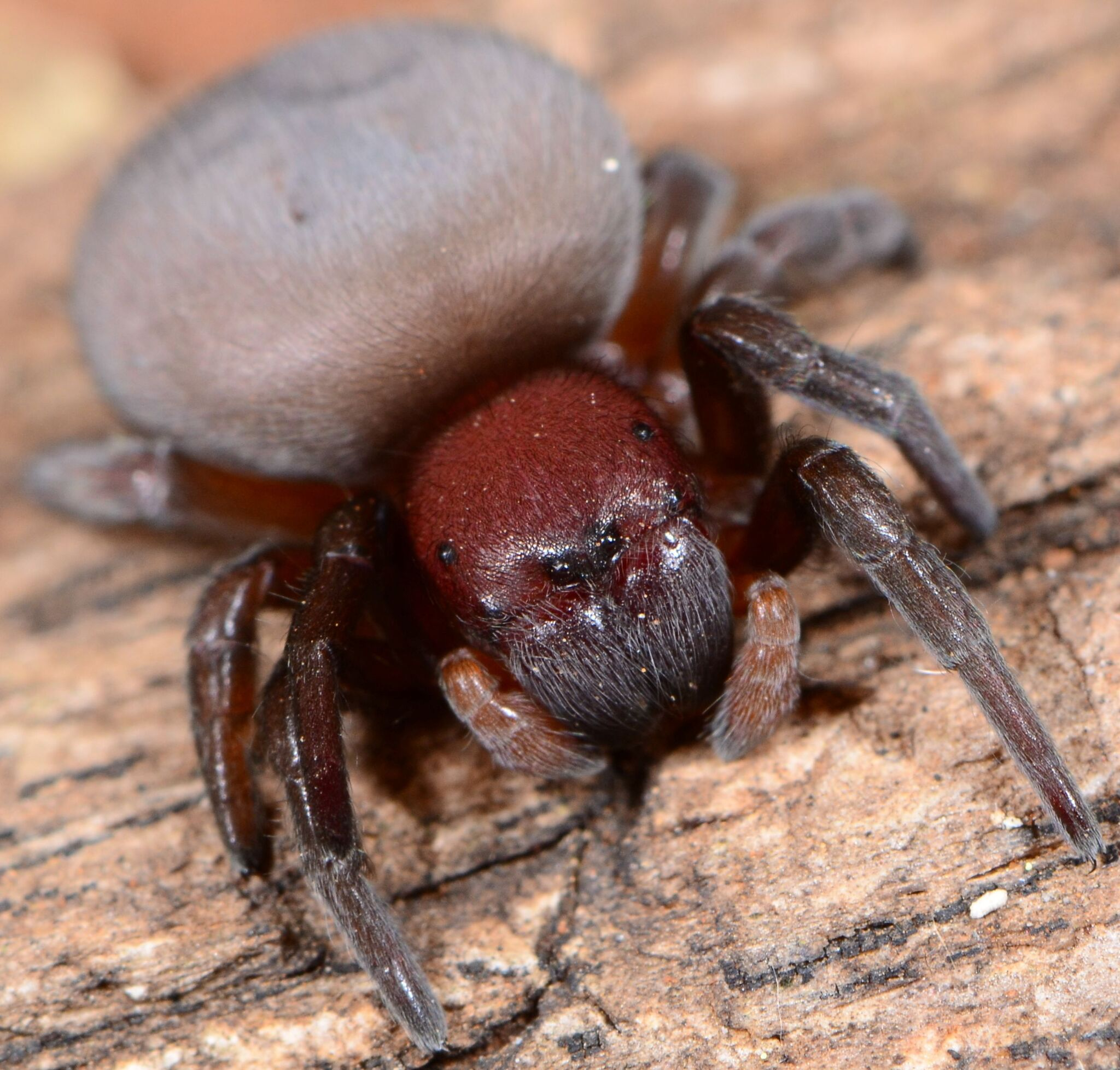
- Male
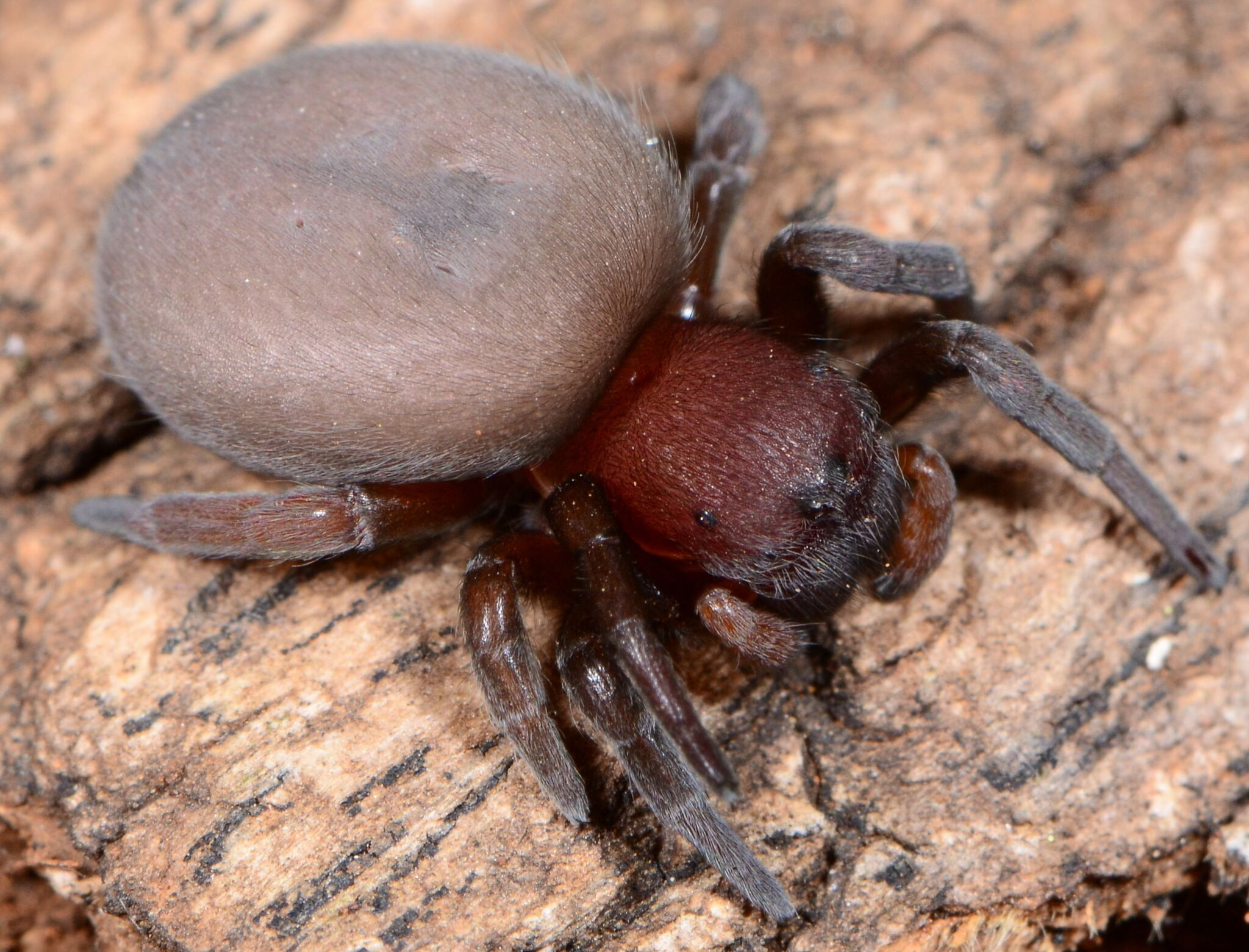
- Male

Scientific classification
- Kingdom: Animalia
- Phylum: Arthropoda
- Subphylum: Chelicerata
- Class: Arachnida
- Order: Araneae
- Infraorder: Araneomorphae
- Family: Eresidae
- Genus: Dresserus
- Species: D. kannemeyeri

Binomial name
- Dresserus kannemeyeri Tucker, 1920

= Dresserus kannemeyeri =

Kannemeyer's Ground Velvet Spider

Species of spider

Dresserus kannemeyeri is a species of spider in the family Eresidae. It is endemic to South Africa and is commonly known as Kannemeyer's ground velvet spider.

The species is named after South African naturalist Daniel Rossouw Kannemeyer.

== Distribution ==
Dresserus kannemeyeri is endemic to South Africa and has been recorded from the Free State and Gauteng provinces. The species occurs in three protected areas across its range.

== Habitat and ecology ==
The species is commonly found in retreat webs under rocks and ground debris, sometimes in compost heaps in gardens. It inhabits areas at altitudes ranging from 1,253 to 1,673 m above sea level in the Grassland biome.

== Description ==
Dresserus kannemeyeri is known from both sexes. The opisthosoma is dull testaceous with moderately long dark setae.

== Conservation ==
Dresserus kannemeyeri is listed as Least Concern by the South African National Biodiversity Institute. The species has a wide geographic range. There are no significant threats to the species, and it is protected in Mpetsane Conservation Estate, Erfenis Dam Nature Reserve, and Suikerbosrand Nature Reserve.

== Taxonomy ==
The species was originally described by Richard William Ethelbert Tucker in 1920 from Smithfield in the Free State. It has not been revised since its original description.
