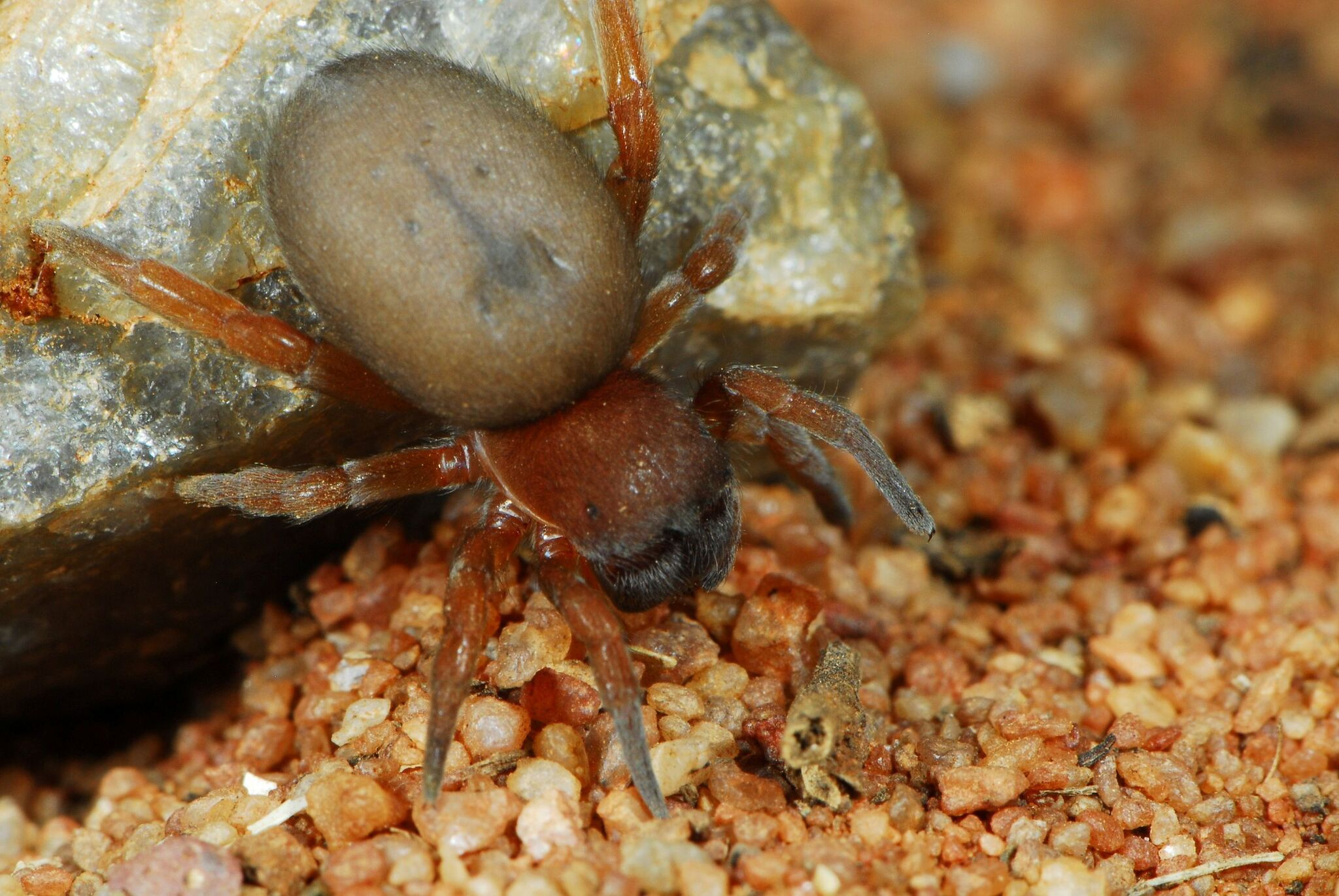
- Female
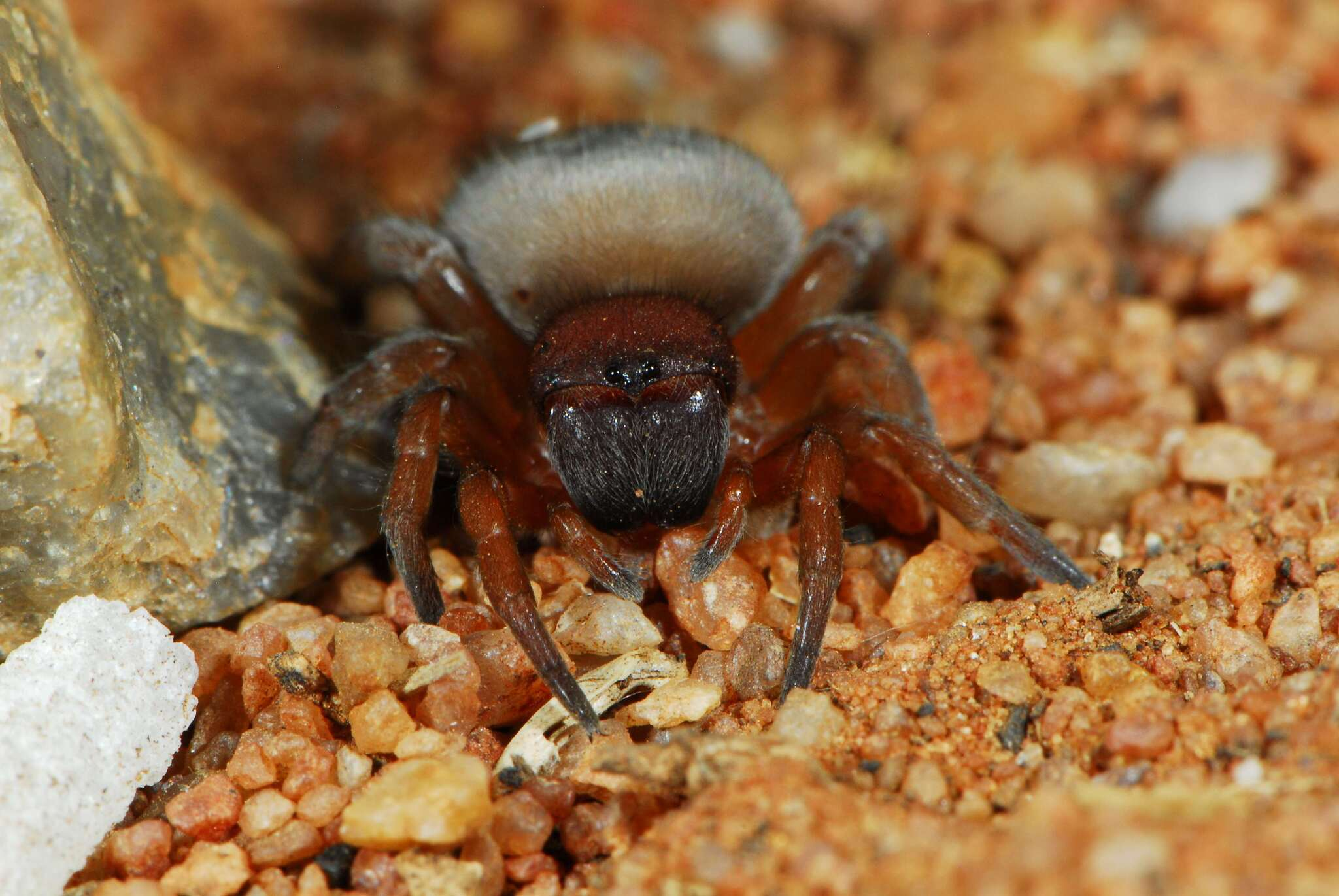
- Female

Scientific classification
- Kingdom: Animalia
- Phylum: Arthropoda
- Subphylum: Chelicerata
- Class: Arachnida
- Order: Araneae
- Infraorder: Araneomorphae
- Family: Eresidae
- Genus: Dresserus
- Species: D. laticeps

Binomial name
- Dresserus laticeps Purcell, 1904

= Dresserus laticeps =

Northern Cape Ground Velvet Spider

Species of spider

Dresserus laticeps is a species of spider in the family Eresidae. It is endemic to South Africa and is commonly known as the Northern Cape ground velvet spider.

== Distribution ==
Dresserus laticeps is endemic to the Northern Cape province of South Africa. The species has been recorded from Tsabis, Tswalu Kalahari Reserve, and Tankwa-Karoo National Park.

== Habitat and ecology ==
The species is rare and found in retreat webs made under rocks. It inhabits areas at altitudes ranging from 251 to 1,156 m above sea level.

== Description ==
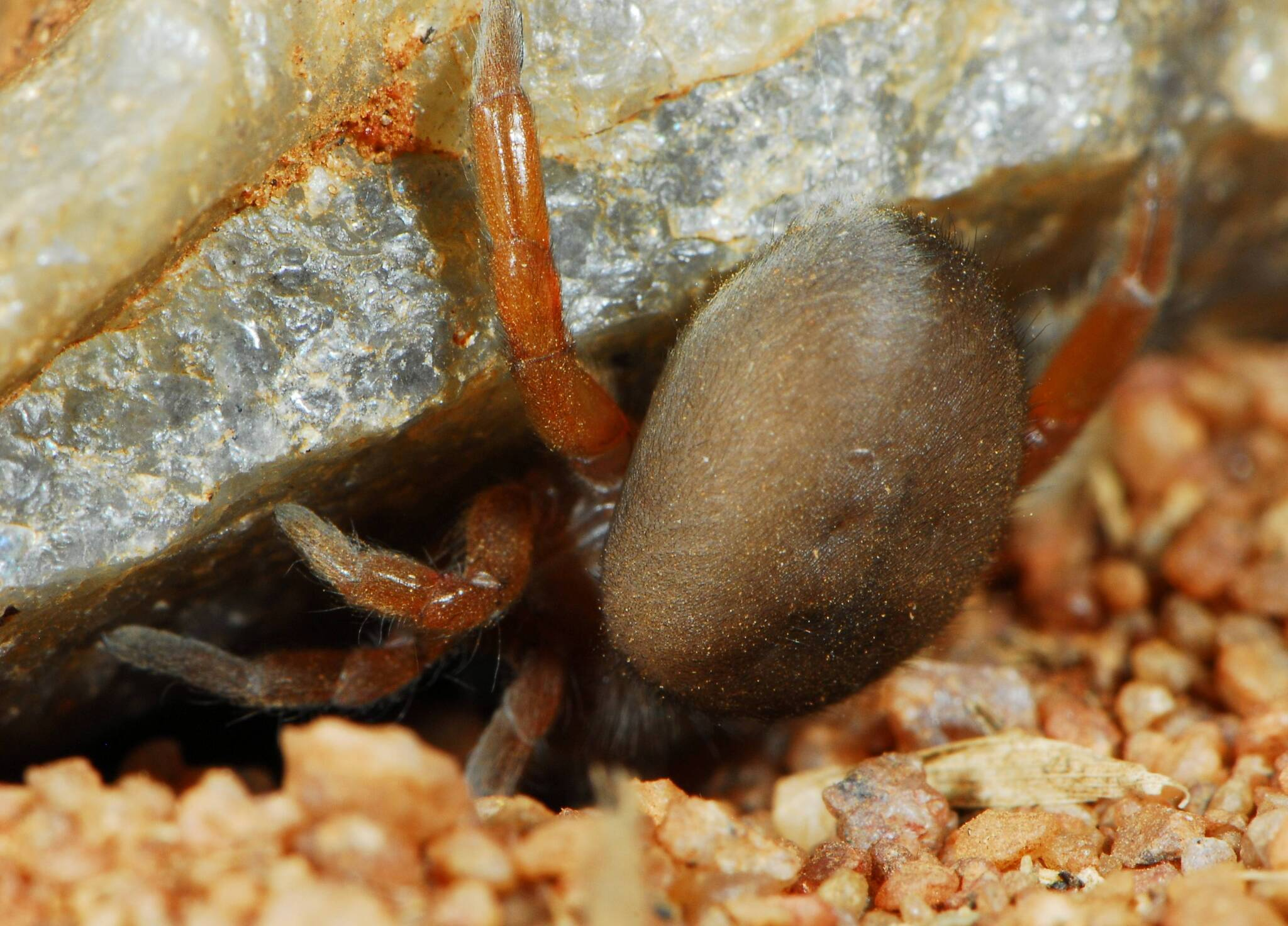
female

Dresserus laticeps is known only from females. The opisthosoma is pale yellowish and covered with olive-brown setae.

== Conservation ==
Dresserus laticeps is listed as Data Deficient due to taxonomic reasons. The species has a very restricted range. The status remains obscure as males have not been collected, and more sampling is needed to determine the species' range. The species is protected in Tswalu Kalahari Reserve and Tankwa-Karoo National Park.

== Taxonomy ==
The species was originally described by William Frederick Purcell in 1904 from Tsabis. It has not been revised since its original description and remains known only from the female sex.
