= Dresserus nigellus =

Scientific classification
- Kingdom: Animalia
- Phylum: Arthropoda
- Subphylum: Chelicerata
- Class: Arachnida
- Order: Araneae
- Infraorder: Araneomorphae
- Family: Eresidae
- Genus: Dresserus
- Species: D. nigellus

Binomial name
- Dresserus nigellus Tucker, 1920

Species of spider

Dresserus nigellus is a species of spider in the family Eresidae. It is endemic to South Africa. They are most commonly found from November to May.

== Distribution ==
Dresserus nigellus is endemic to the Western Cape province of South Africa. The species has been recorded from Matroosberg and Gamkaberg Nature Reserve.

== Habitat and ecology ==
The species is rare and found in retreat webs made under rocks in the Fynbos biome. It inhabits areas at altitudes ranging from 980 to 1,161 m above sea level.

== Description ==
It has a dark coloured brown, yellow to grey skin with thin hair on its body. Its can grow from 7 mm to 20 mm with males usually being smaller than females.

Dresserus nigellus is known only from females. The opisthosoma is infuscated testaceous and clothed with black setae.

== Conservation ==
Dresserus nigellus is listed as Data Deficient due to taxonomic reasons. The species has a very restricted range. The status remains obscure as males have not been collected, and more sampling is needed to determine the species' range. The species is protected in Gamkaberg Nature Reserve.

== Taxonomy ==
The species was originally described by Richard William Ethelbert Tucker in 1920 from Matroosberg. It has not been revised since its original description and remains known only from the female sex.
