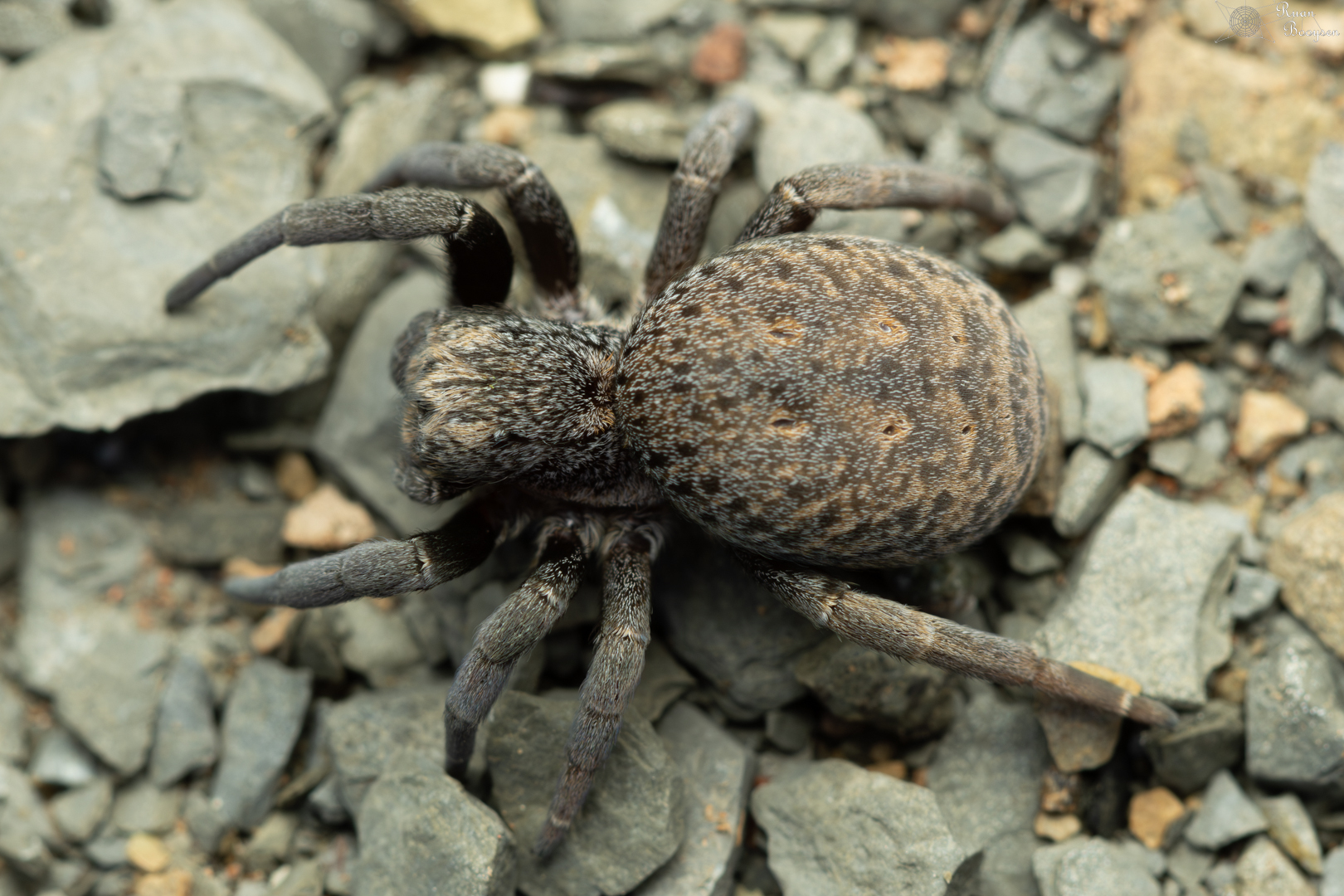
- female
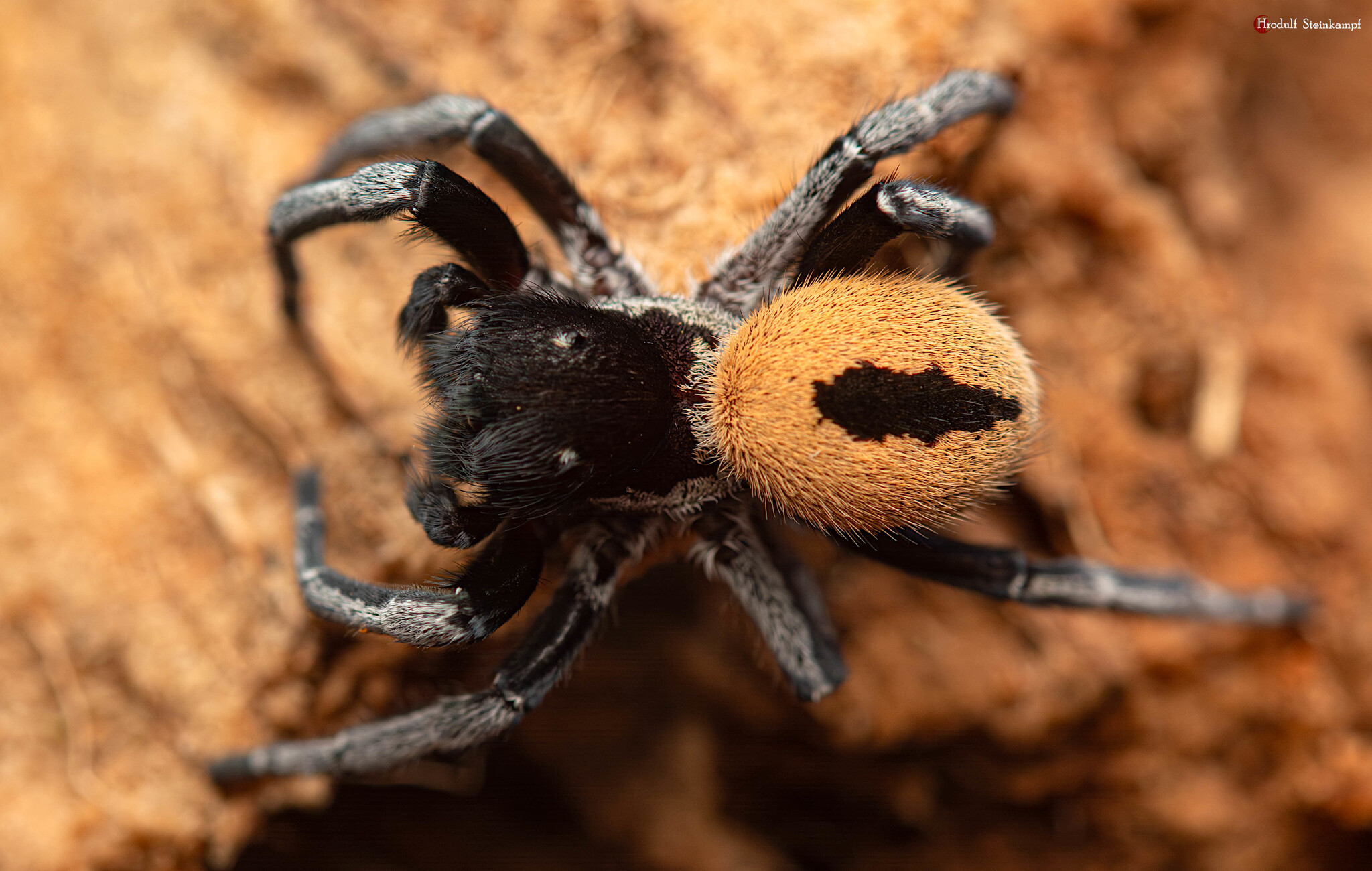
- male

Scientific classification
- Kingdom: Animalia
- Phylum: Arthropoda
- Subphylum: Chelicerata
- Class: Arachnida
- Order: Araneae
- Infraorder: Araneomorphae
- Family: Eresidae
- Genus: Paradonea
- Species: P. variegata

Binomial name
- Paradonea variegata (Purcell, 1904)

= Paradonea variegata =

Spotted Velvet Spider

Species of spider

Paradonea variegata is a species of spider in the family Eresidae. It occurs in southern Africa and is commonly known as the spotted velvet spider.

== Distribution ==
Paradonea variegata is found in Namibia, Botswana, and South Africa. In South Africa, it occurs in two provinces, Northern Cape and Western Cape.

== Habitat and ecology ==
The species inhabits Savanna, Nama Karoo, Succulent Karoo, and Fynbos biomes at altitudes ranging from 56 to 1,405 m above sea level.

They build silken tube-like nests under stones or under shrubs. Sometimes, spiders build a round web approximately 10 cm in diameter that may be covered with sand and herbal debris. Juveniles feed on their mother's corpse before dispersing, and adults appear around December while juveniles disperse in October.

== Description ==
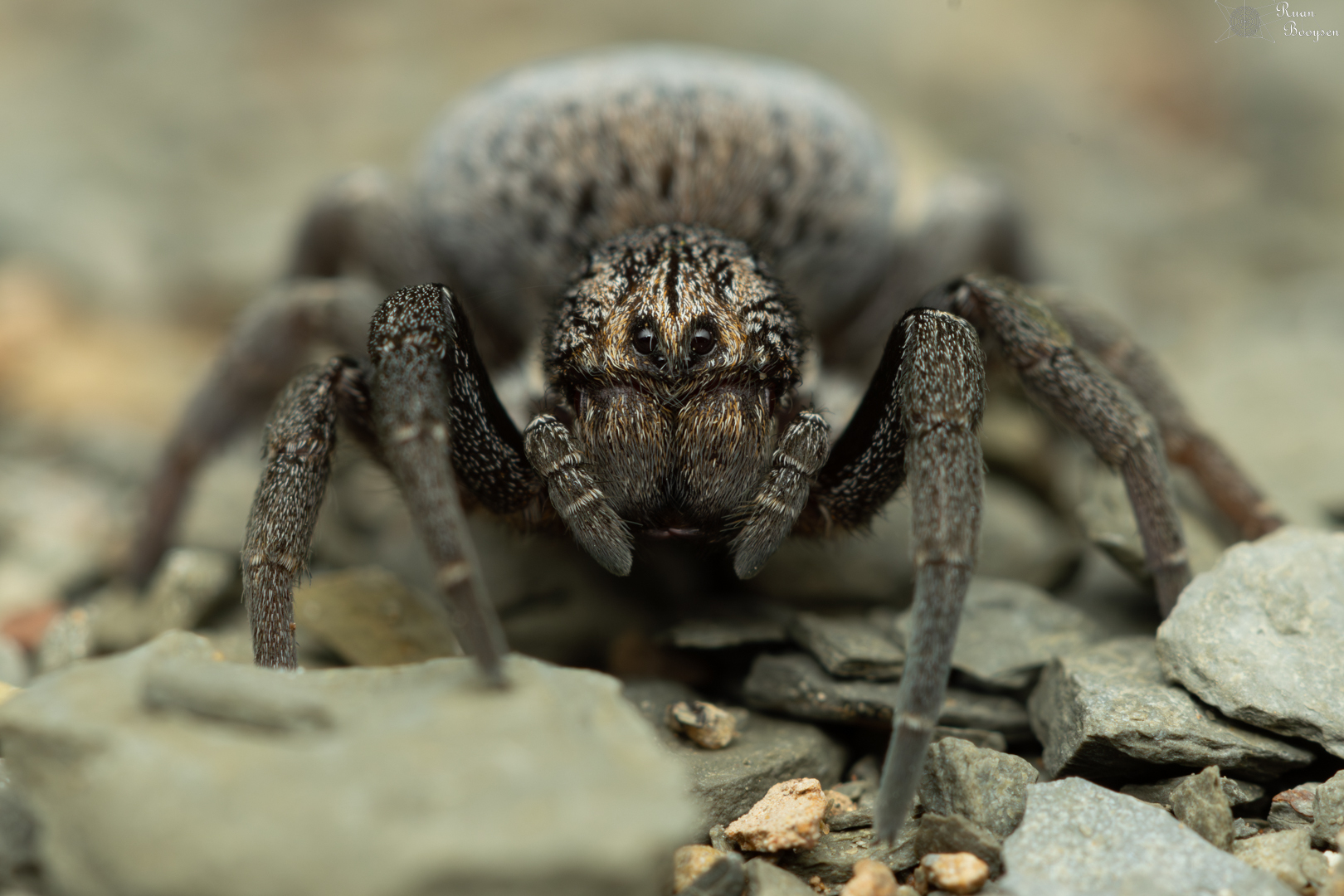
female

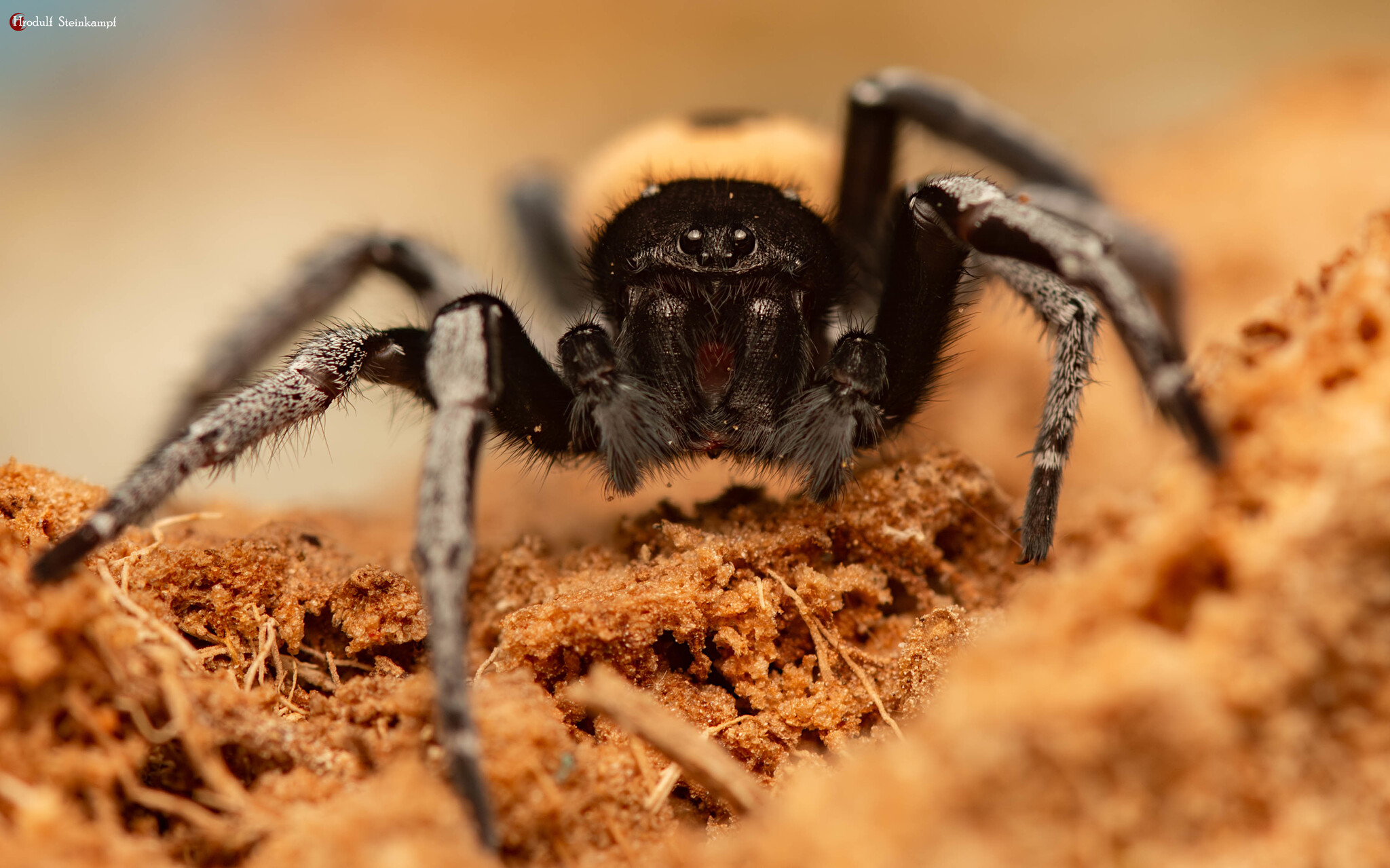
male

The species is known from both sexes.

== Conservation ==
Paradonea variegata is listed as Least Concern by the South African National Biodiversity Institute due to its wide geographical range across southern Africa. The species is protected in three protected areas including Namaqua National Park, Richtersveld Transfrontier National Park, and Karoo National Park.

== Etymology ==
The species epithet "variegata" is Latin for "variegated" or "spotted", referring to the distinctive spotted pattern on the spider's opisthosoma.

== Taxonomy ==
The species was originally described by William Frederick Purcell in 1904 as Adonea variegata from Naroep in the Northern Cape. It was later transferred to Paradonea by Lawrence in 1968 and revised by Miller et al. in 2012.
