= Dresserus schreineri =

Scientific classification
- Kingdom: Animalia
- Phylum: Arthropoda
- Subphylum: Chelicerata
- Class: Arachnida
- Order: Araneae
- Infraorder: Araneomorphae
- Family: Eresidae
- Genus: Dresserus
- Species: D. schreineri

Binomial name
- Dresserus schreineri Tucker, 1920

Species of spider

Dresserus schreineri is a species of spider in the family Eresidae. It is endemic to South Africa.

== Distribution ==
Dresserus schreineri is endemic to South Africa and has been recorded from the Northern Cape and Western Cape provinces. The species has been found in Hanover and Karoo National Park.

== Habitat and ecology ==
The species is rare and found in retreat webs made under rocks in the Nama Karoo biome. It inhabits areas at altitudes ranging from 1,212 to 1,358 m above sea level.

== Description ==
Dresserus schreineri is known from both sexes. The opisthosoma is dull testaceous and clothed with moderately long dark setae.

== Conservation ==
Dresserus schreineri is listed as Data Deficient due to the species' obscure status. The species is protected in Karoo National Park.

== Taxonomy ==
The species was originally described by Richard William Ethelbert Tucker in 1920 from Hanover. It has not been revised since its original description.
