= Dresserus olivaceus =

Scientific classification
- Kingdom: Animalia
- Phylum: Arthropoda
- Subphylum: Chelicerata
- Class: Arachnida
- Order: Araneae
- Infraorder: Araneomorphae
- Family: Eresidae
- Genus: Dresserus
- Species: D. olivaceus

Binomial name
- Dresserus olivaceus Pocock, 1900

Species of spider

Dresserus olivaceus is a species of spider in the family Eresidae. It is endemic to South Africa.

== Distribution ==
Dresserus olivaceus is endemic to the Eastern Cape province of South Africa. The species is known only from the type locality of Grahamstown.

== Habitat and ecology ==
The species is rare and found in retreat webs made under rocks in the Thicket biome. It inhabits areas at an altitude of 552 m above sea level.

== Description ==
Dresserus olivaceus is known only from females. The species is darker in colour above and below, being of a silky greenish black.

== Conservation ==
Dresserus olivaceus is listed as Data Deficient due to taxonomic reasons. The species has a very restricted range. The status remains obscure as males have not been collected, and more sampling is needed to determine the species' range. Redescription of the type specimen is needed.

== Taxonomy ==
The species was originally described by Reginald Innes Pocock in 1900 from Grahamstown. It has not been revised since its original description and remains known only from the female sex.
