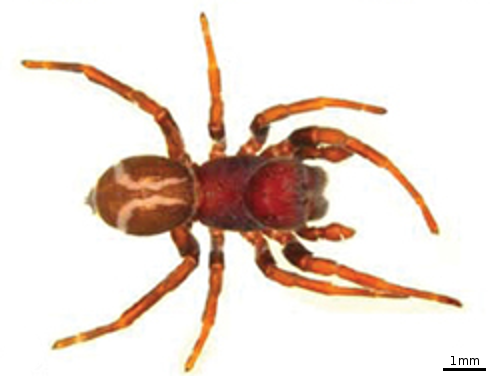
- Dorsal view of P. presleyi

Scientific classification
- Kingdom: Animalia
- Phylum: Arthropoda
- Subphylum: Chelicerata
- Class: Arachnida
- Order: Araneae
- Infraorder: Araneomorphae
- Family: Eresidae
- Genus: Paradonea
- Species: P. presleyi

Binomial name
- Paradonea presleyi Miller, Griswold, Scharff, Rezác, Szüts, & Marhabaie, 2012

= Paradonea presleyi =

Presley's Velvet Spider

Species of spider

Paradonea presleyi is a species of araneomorph spiders in the family Eresidae. It is found in Zimbabwe and South Africa.

== Etymology ==
The species is named after Elvis Presley, described by Miller et al. as the "king of rock and roll and subject of innumerable black velvet paintings”

== Distribution ==
This species is found in Zimbabwe and South Africa. In South Africa, it occurs in two provinces: Limpopo and Mpumalanga.

== Habitat and ecology ==
The species inhabits Savanna biomes at altitudes ranging from 285 to 1,341 m above sea level.

They build a silken tube-like nest under stones or under shrubs. Males have been collected from pitfall traps, suggesting terrestrial activity patterns.

== Description ==
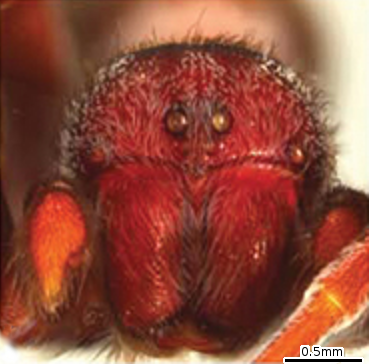
Frontal view of P. presleyi

The male holotype has white setae concentrated in the thoracic and eye regions. The cephalic region is semicircular, wider than it is long, and moderately raised. The chelicerae are contiguous mesally, with a lateral boss. The legs have patches and longitudinal bands of white setae. Femur I is slightly thickened with a thick brush of dark setae; there are rows of distal ventral macrosetae on metatarsus I–IV, and a few scattered ventral macrosetae on tarsus I–IV and metatarsus II–IV. The dorsum of the abdomen has two longitudinal stripes of white hairs which are parallel anteriorly, diverge posteriorly, before connecting by transverse portion. The median part is medium brown, with the ectal and posterior parts being dark brown.

The male palp have proximal-distal axis. The tegulum is subrectangular, and the conductor and embolus together form an apical complex moving distally. The conductor is moderately sclerotized and broad with a helical ridge fringed with distinct papillae, and hooked distally. Tegular division is slightly longer than the embolic division. The cymbium has several prolateral macrosetae.

No information has been published about the female of the species.

== Conservation ==
Paradonea presleyi is listed as Least Concern by the South African National Biodiversity Institute due to its wide geographical range in southern Africa. The species is protected in five protected areas including Kruger National Park, Blouberg Nature Reserve, Ben Lavin Nature Reserve, and Luvhondo Nature Reserve.

== Taxonomy ==
The species was described by Miller et al. in 2012 from Zimbabwe.

== See also ==
- Preseucoela imallshookupis, a species of wasp also named after Elvis Presley
- List of organisms named after famous people (born 1925–1949)
