= Paradonea splendens =

Scientific classification
- Kingdom: Animalia
- Phylum: Arthropoda
- Subphylum: Chelicerata
- Class: Arachnida
- Order: Araneae
- Infraorder: Araneomorphae
- Family: Eresidae
- Genus: Paradonea
- Species: P. splendens

Binomial name
- Paradonea splendens (Lawrence, 1936)

Species of spider

Paradonea splendens is a species of spider in the family Eresidae. It is endemic to South Africa.

== Etymology ==
The species epithet "splendens" is Latin for "shiny" or "splendid".

== Distribution ==
Paradonea splendens is found exclusively in South Africa, where it occurs in two provinces: Gauteng and Northern Cape.

== Habitat and ecology ==
The species inhabits Grassland and Savanna biomes at altitudes ranging from 1,102 to 1,345 m above sea level.

The species is a ground-dweller that builds silken tubes under stones or under shrubs.

== Description ==
The species is currently known only from males.

== Conservation ==
Paradonea splendens is listed as Data Deficient by the IUCN for taxonomic reasons. The species is possibly under-collected, and too little is known about its location, habitat, and threats for a proper assessment. The placement of the species is also problematic taxonomically.

The species is protected in Benfontein Nature Reserve. Additional sampling is needed to better understand its distribution and conservation needs.

== Taxonomy ==
This species was originally described by Lawrence in 1936 as Adonea splendens from Gemsbok Pan. It was later transferred to Paradonea by Lawrence in 1968 and revised by Miller et al. in 2012.
