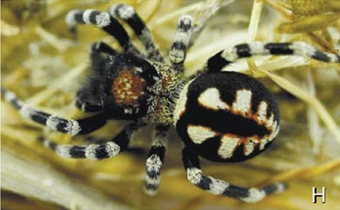
- Male

Scientific classification
- Kingdom: Animalia
- Phylum: Arthropoda
- Subphylum: Chelicerata
- Class: Arachnida
- Order: Araneae
- Infraorder: Araneomorphae
- Family: Eresidae
- Genus: Loureedia
- Species: L. annulipes

Binomial name
- Loureedia annulipes (Lucas, 1857)

Synonyms
- Eresus annulipes Lucas, 1857; Eresus semicanus Simon, 1908; Eresus jerbae El-Hennawy, 2005; Stegodyphus annulipes (Lucas, 1857)

= Loureedia annulipes =

Species of spider

Loureedia annulipes is a species of spider in the velvet spider family Eresidae, found in Libya, Egypt and Israel.

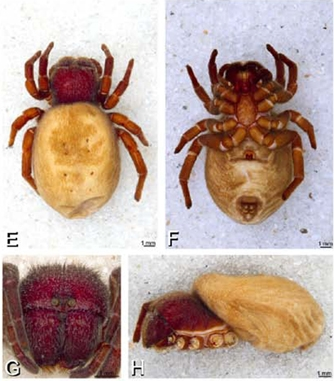
Preserved specimens of female
