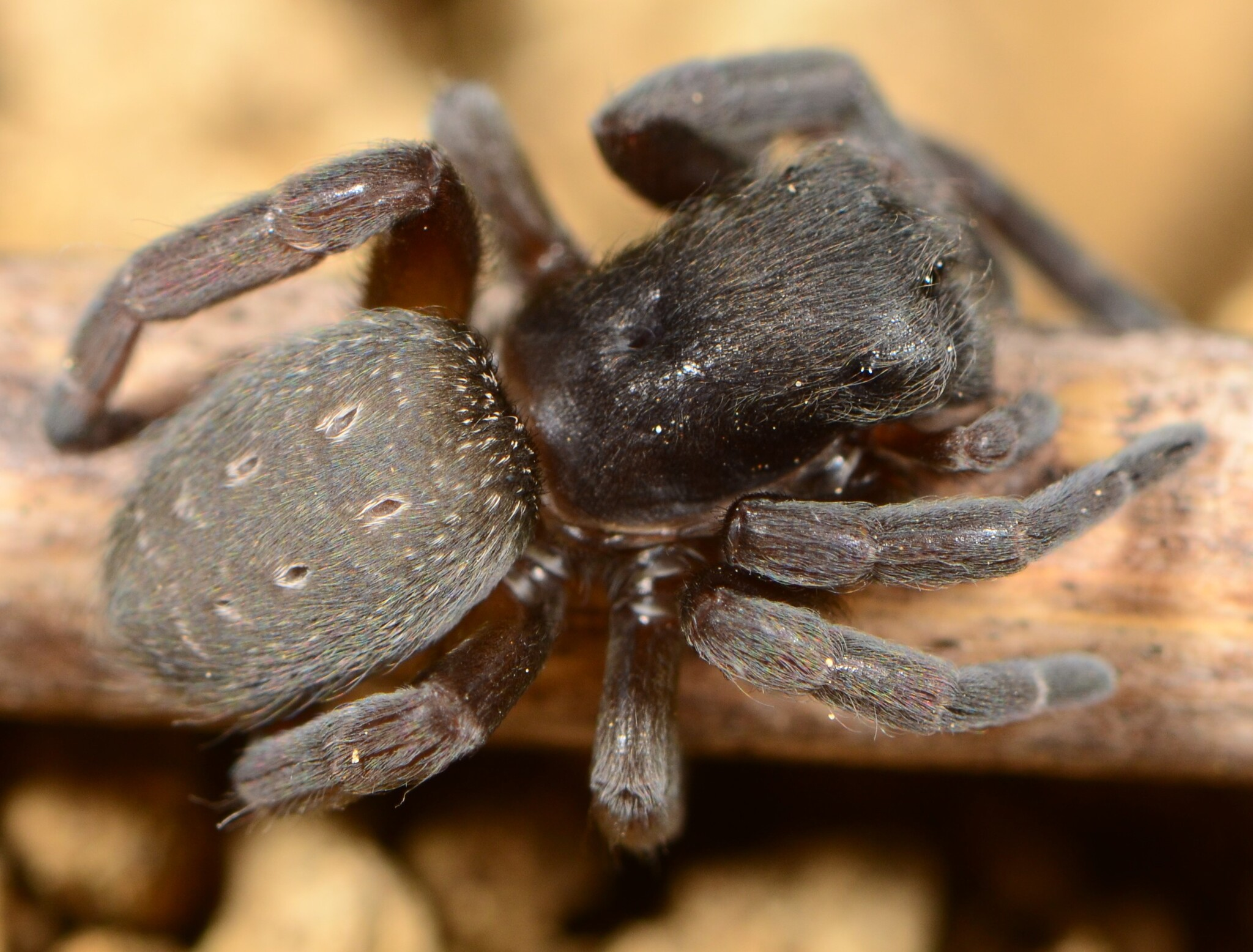
- Female
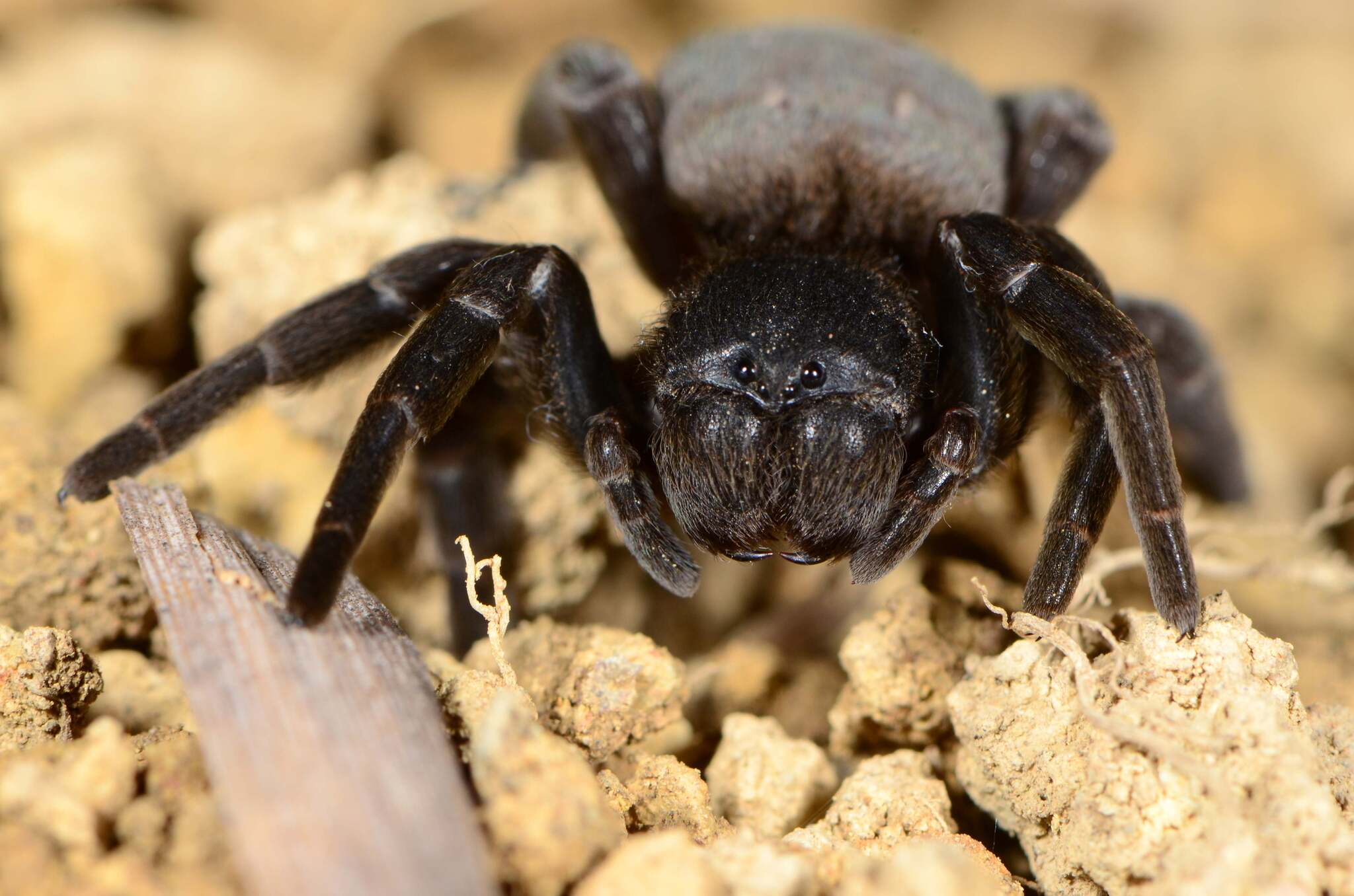
- Female

Scientific classification
- Kingdom: Animalia
- Phylum: Arthropoda
- Subphylum: Chelicerata
- Class: Arachnida
- Order: Araneae
- Infraorder: Araneomorphae
- Family: Eresidae
- Genus: Gandanameno
- Species: G. purcelli

Binomial name
- Gandanameno purcelli (Tucker, 1920)

= Gandanameno purcelli =

Purcell's Velvet Spider

Species of spider

Gandanameno purcelli is a species of spider in the family Eresidae. It is endemic to South Africa and is commonly known as Purcell's velvet spider.

== Etymology ==
The species is named after William Frederick Purcell.

== Distribution ==
Gandanameno purcelli is found exclusively in South Africa, where it occurs across the provinces Eastern Cape, Gauteng, KwaZulu-Natal, Limpopo, Northern Cape, and Western Cape.

== Habitat and ecology ==
The species inhabits multiple biomes including Grassland, Savanna, Thicket, Fynbos, and Indian Ocean Coastal Belt biomes at altitudes ranging from 9 to 1,212 m above sea level.

The species builds a retreat-web under stones and ground debris or sometimes under loose bark. This behavior provides protection while allowing the spider to detect prey movement.

== Description ==
Gandanameno purcelli is distinguished by its dull opisthosoma with short scanty setae and the absence of white rings around dorsal stigmata. The species lacks spines on the underside of the coxae of the first leg, which helps distinguish it from related species.

The species is currently known only from females.

== Conservation ==
Gandanameno purcelli is listed as Least Concern by the South African National Biodiversity Institute due to its wide geographical range across South Africa. The species is protected in ten protected areas including Kruger National Park, Karoo National Park, Swartberg Nature Reserve, and Table Mountain National Park.

== Taxonomy ==
The species was originally described by Richard William Ethelbert Tucker in 1920 as Eresus purcelli from East London. It was later transferred to the genus Gandanameno by Pekka Lehtinen in 1967.
