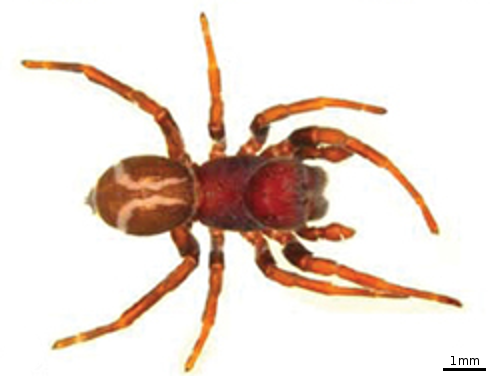
- P. presleyi

Scientific classification
- Kingdom: Animalia
- Phylum: Arthropoda
- Subphylum: Chelicerata
- Class: Arachnida
- Order: Araneae
- Infraorder: Araneomorphae
- Family: Eresidae
- Genus: Paradonea; Lawrence, 1968

Type species
- P. striatipes Lawrence, 1968

Species
- 5, see text

= Paradonea =

Genus of spiders

Paradonea is a genus of African velvet spiders that was first described by R. F. Lawrence in 1968.

== Species ==
As of September 2025 it contains five species:

- Paradonea parva (Tucker, 1920) – Namibia, Botswana, South Africa
- Paradonea presleyi Miller, Griswold, Scharff, Řezáč, Szűts & Marhabaie, 2012 – Zimbabwe, South Africa
- Paradonea splendens (Lawrence, 1936) – Botswana, South Africa
- Paradonea striatipes Lawrence, 1968 (type) – Namibia, South Africa
- Paradonea variegata (Purcell, 1904) – Namibia, Botswana, South Africa
