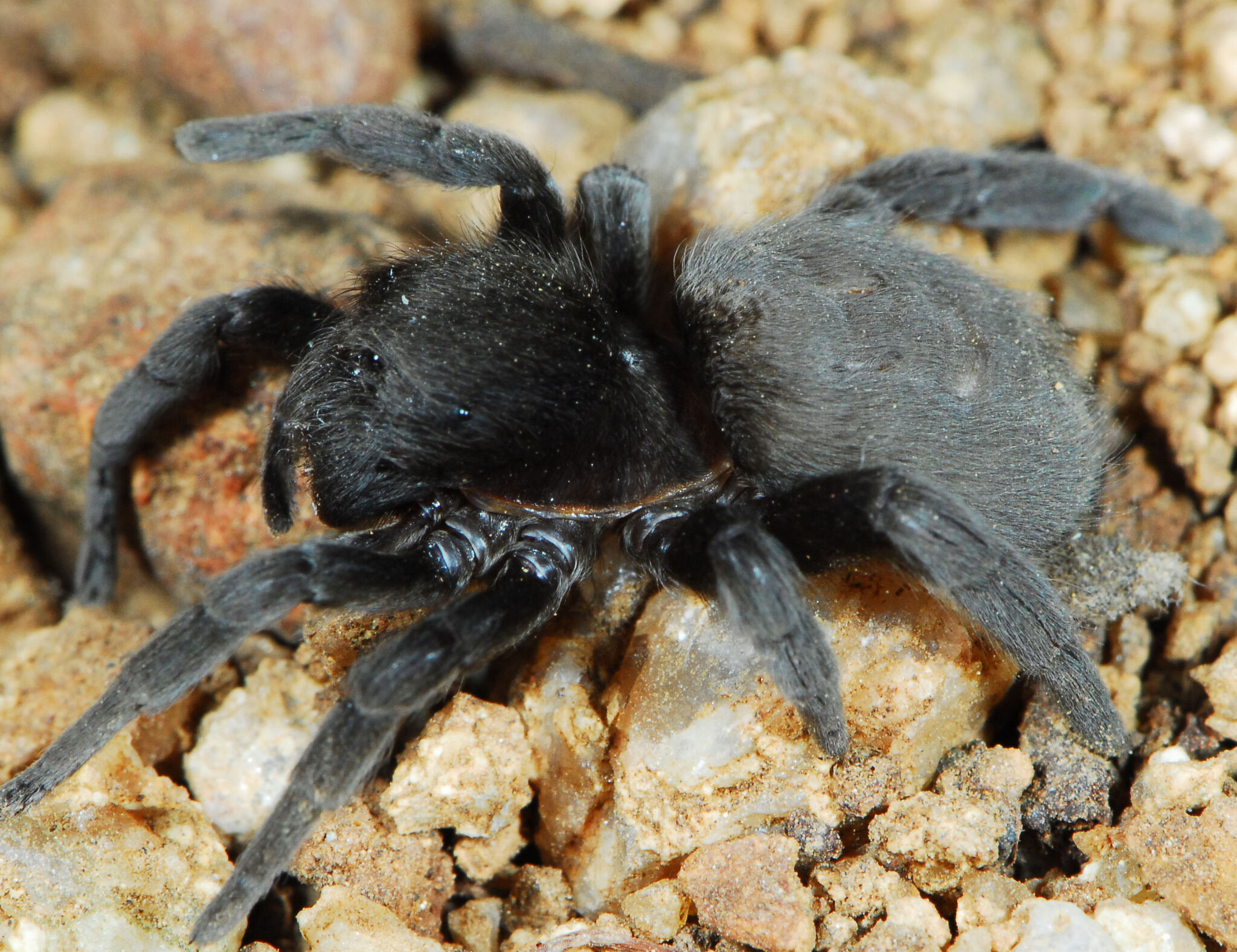
- Female
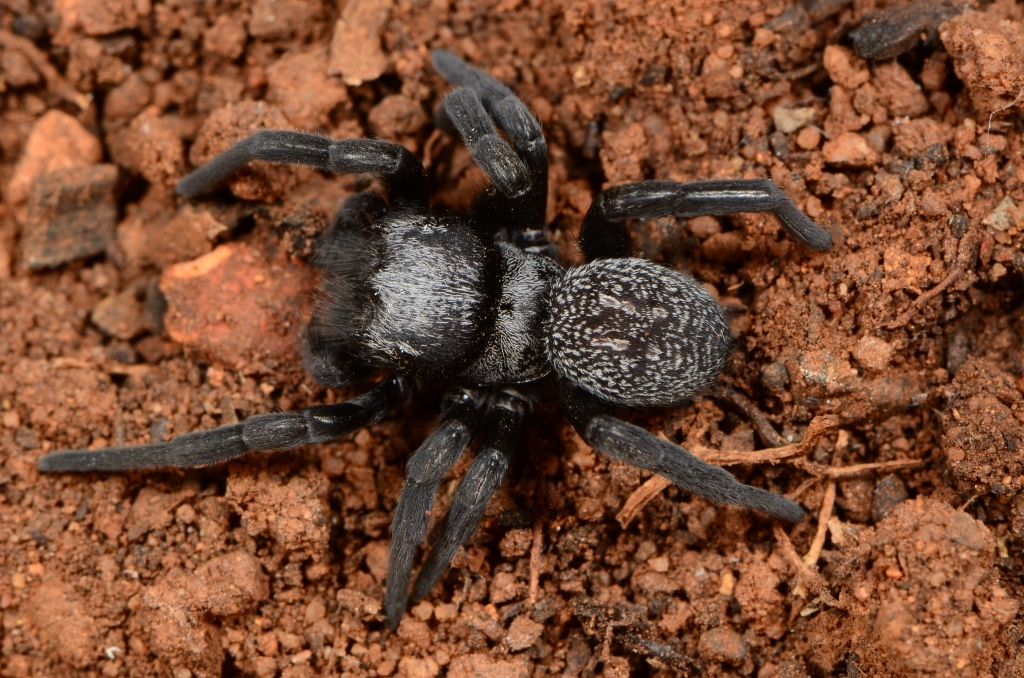
- Male

Scientific classification
- Kingdom: Animalia
- Phylum: Arthropoda
- Subphylum: Chelicerata
- Class: Arachnida
- Order: Araneae
- Infraorder: Araneomorphae
- Family: Eresidae
- Genus: Dresserus
- Species: D. colsoni

Binomial name
- Dresserus colsoni Tucker, 1920

= Dresserus colsoni =

Common Ground Velvet Spider

Species of spider

Dresserus colsoni is a species of spider in the family Eresidae. It is endemic to South Africa and is commonly known as the common ground velvet spider.

== Distribution ==
Dresserus colsoni is endemic to South Africa and has been recorded from five provinces: Gauteng, KwaZulu-Natal, Limpopo, Mpumalanga, and North West. The species occurs in more than 10 protected areas across its range.

== Habitat and ecology ==
The species is commonly found in retreat webs, mainly under stones and sometimes in compost heaps in gardens. It inhabits areas at altitudes ranging from 54 to 1,909 m above sea level in the Grassland and Savanna biomes.

== Description ==
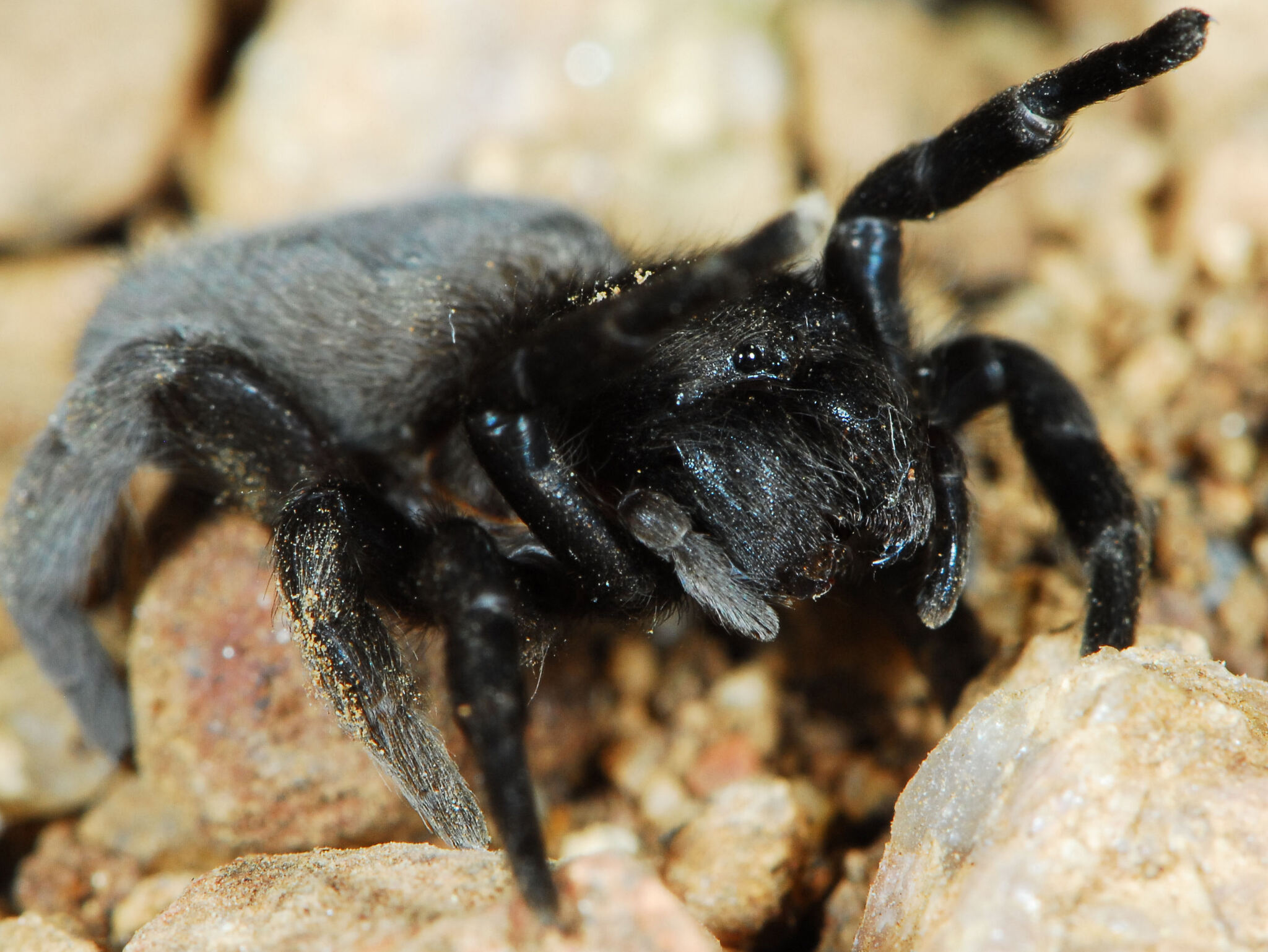
female

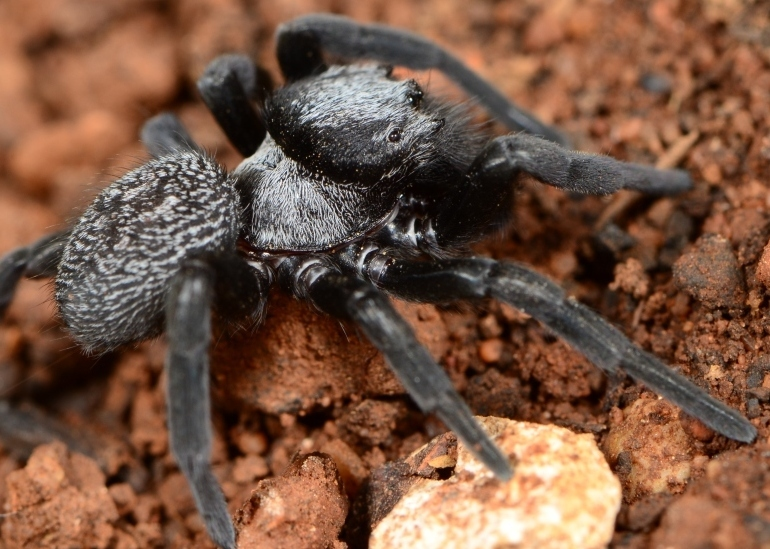
male

Dresserus colsoni is known from both sexes. The opisthosoma is dull testaceous brown and covered with short setae.

== Conservation ==
Dresserus colsoni is listed as Least Concern by the South African National Biodiversity Institute. Despite being known only from one sex in early descriptions, the species has a wide geographical range. The species is protected in more than 10 protected areas including Kruger National Park, Polokwane Nature Reserve, and Nylsvley Nature Reserve.

== Taxonomy ==
The species was originally described by R.W.E. Tucker in 1920 from Lydenburg in Mpumalanga. It has not been revised since its original description.
