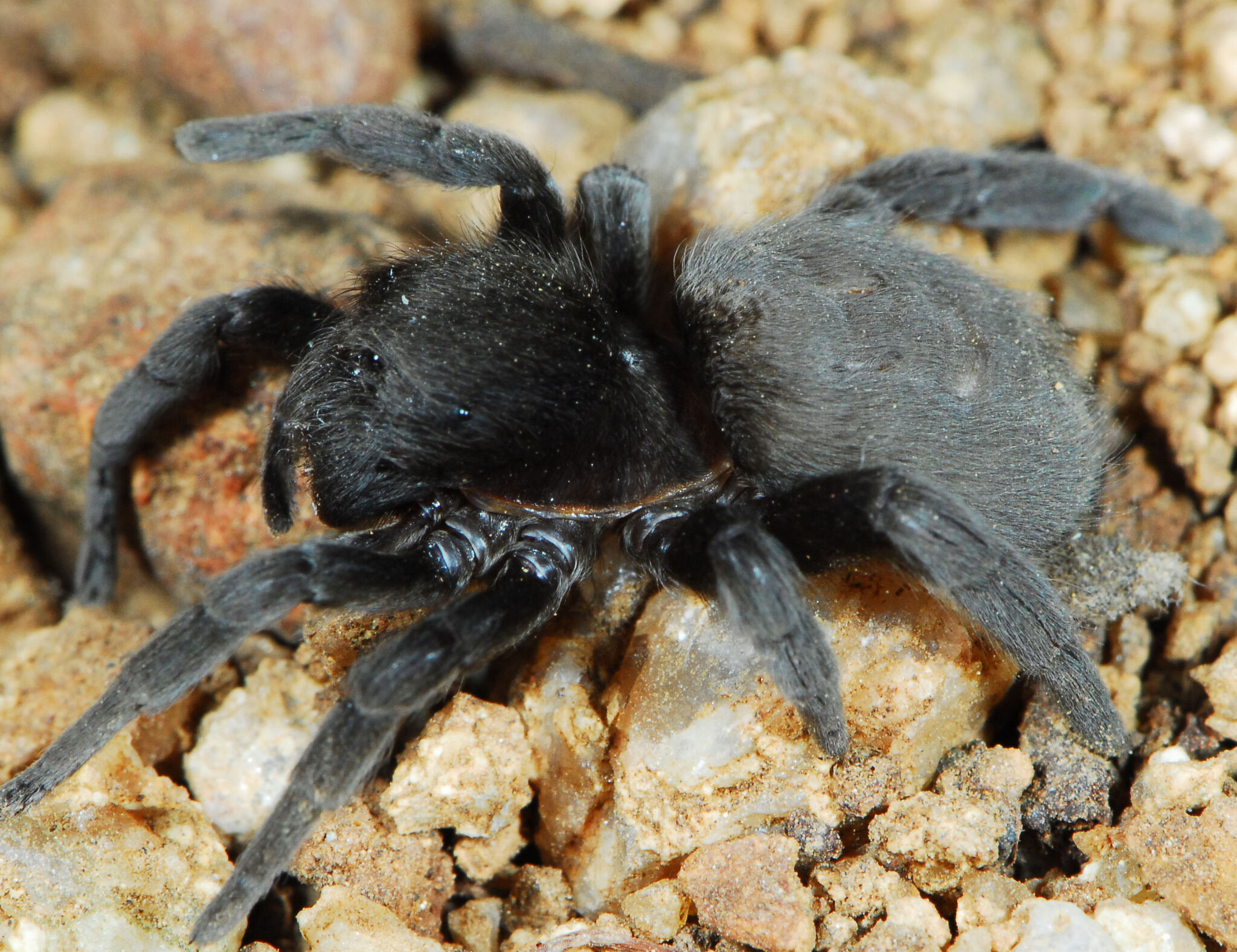
- Female D. colsoni
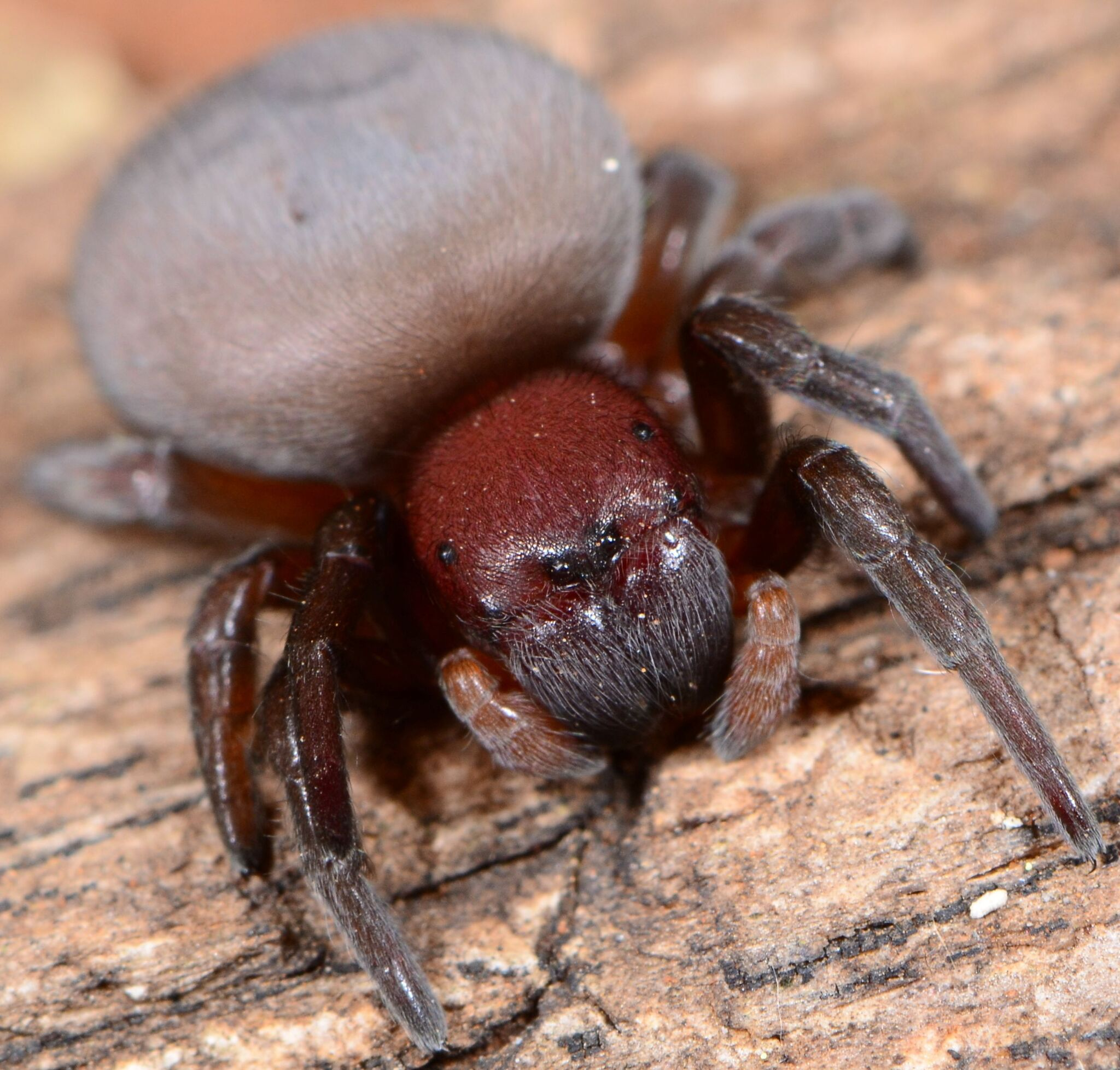
- Male D. kannemeyeri

Scientific classification
- Kingdom: Animalia
- Phylum: Arthropoda
- Subphylum: Chelicerata
- Class: Arachnida
- Order: Araneae
- Infraorder: Araneomorphae
- Family: Eresidae
- Genus: Dresserus; Simon, 1876

Type species
- D. fuscus Simon, 1876

Species
- 23, see text

= Dresserus =

Genus of spiders

Dresserus is a genus of African velvet spiders that was first described by Eugène Simon in 1876.

== Species ==
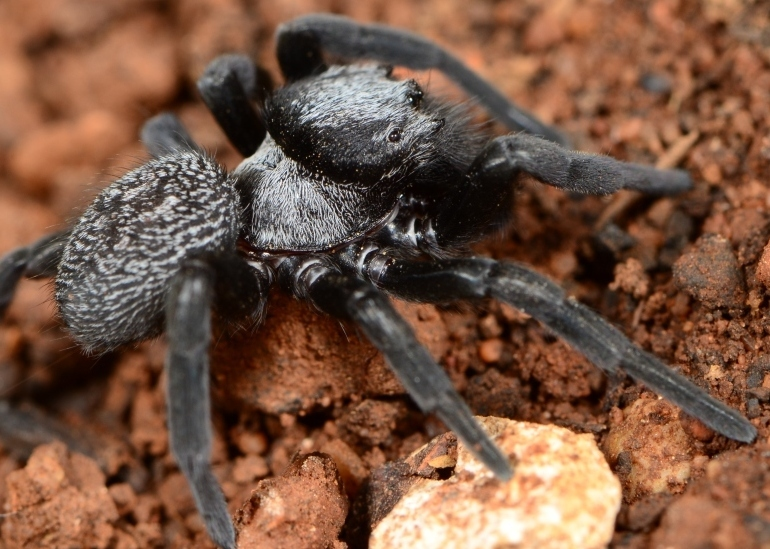
male D. colsoni

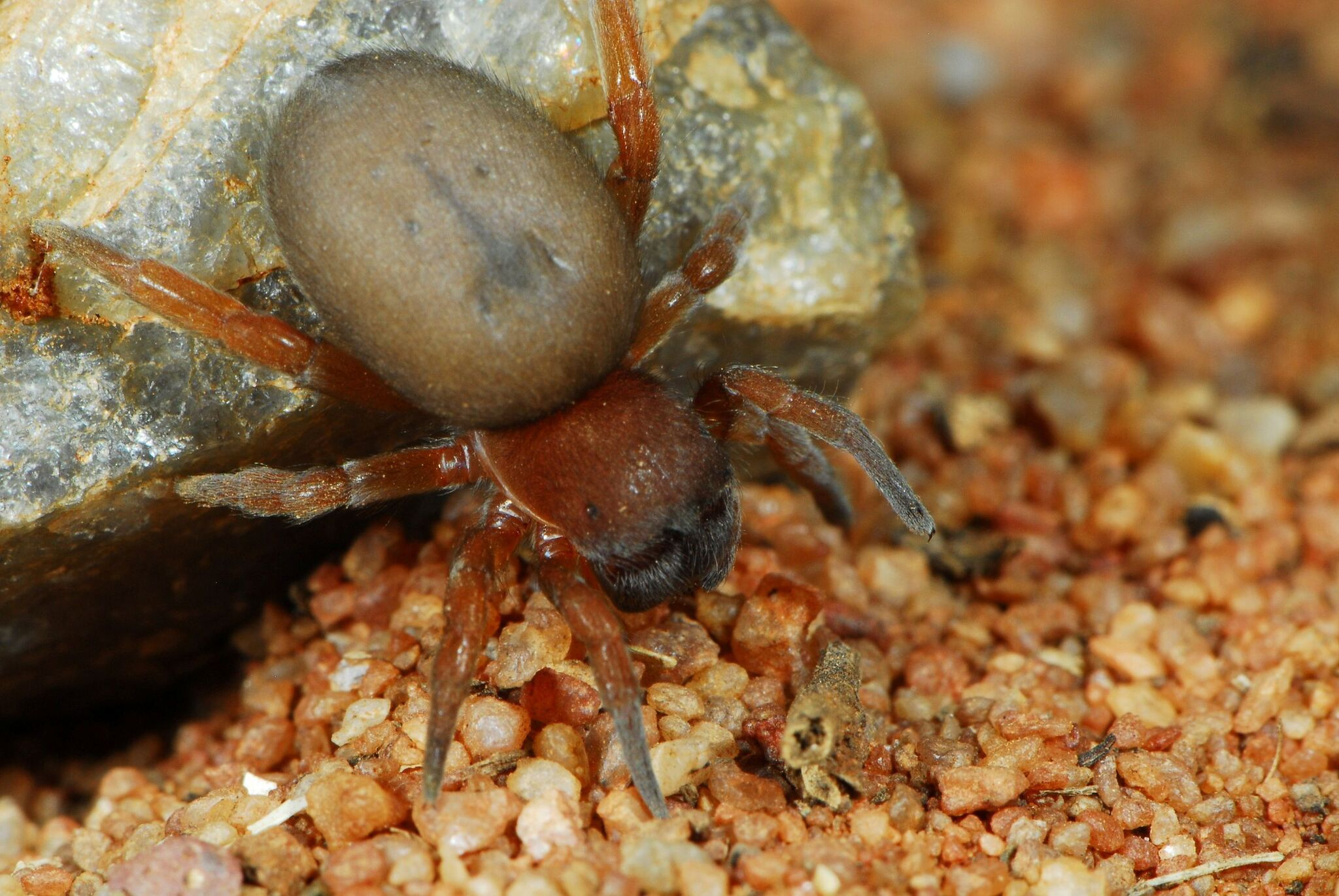
female D. laticeps

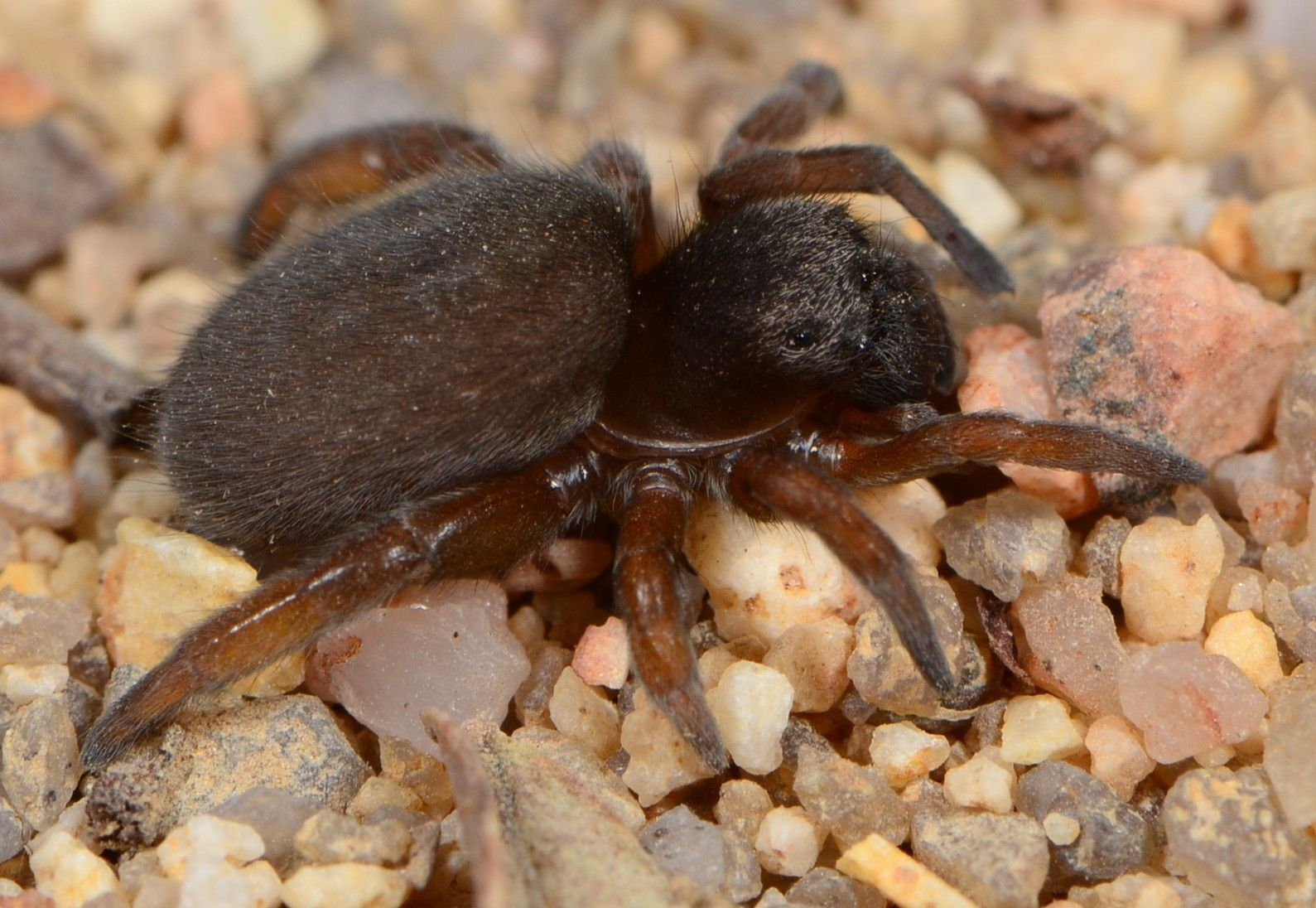
juvenile D. namaquensis

As of October 2025, this genus includes 23 species:

- Dresserus aethiopicus Simon, 1909 – Ethiopia
- Dresserus angusticeps Purcell, 1904 – South Africa
- Dresserus armatus Pocock, 1901 – Uganda
- Dresserus bilineatus Tullgren, 1910 – East Africa
- Dresserus collinus Pocock, 1900 – South Africa
- Dresserus colsoni Tucker, 1920 – South Africa
- Dresserus darlingi Pocock, 1900 – Zimbabwe
- Dresserus elongatus Tullgren, 1910 – East Africa
- Dresserus fontensis Lawrence, 1928 – Namibia
- Dresserus fuscus Simon, 1876 – East Africa, Zanzibar (type species)
- Dresserus kannemeyeri Tucker, 1920 – South Africa
- Dresserus laticeps Purcell, 1904 – South Africa
- Dresserus murinus Lawrence, 1927 – Namibia
- Dresserus namaquensis Purcell, 1908 – South Africa
- Dresserus nigellus Tucker, 1920 – South Africa
- Dresserus obscurus Pocock, 1898 – South Africa
- Dresserus olivaceus Pocock, 1900 – South Africa
- Dresserus rostratus Purcell, 1908 – Namibia
- Dresserus schreineri Tucker, 1920 – South Africa
- Dresserus schultzei Purcell, 1908 – Namibia
- Dresserus sericatus Tucker, 1920 – Namibia
- Dresserus subarmatus Tullgren, 1910 – East Africa, Botswana
- Dresserus tripartitus Lawrence, 1938 – South Africa
