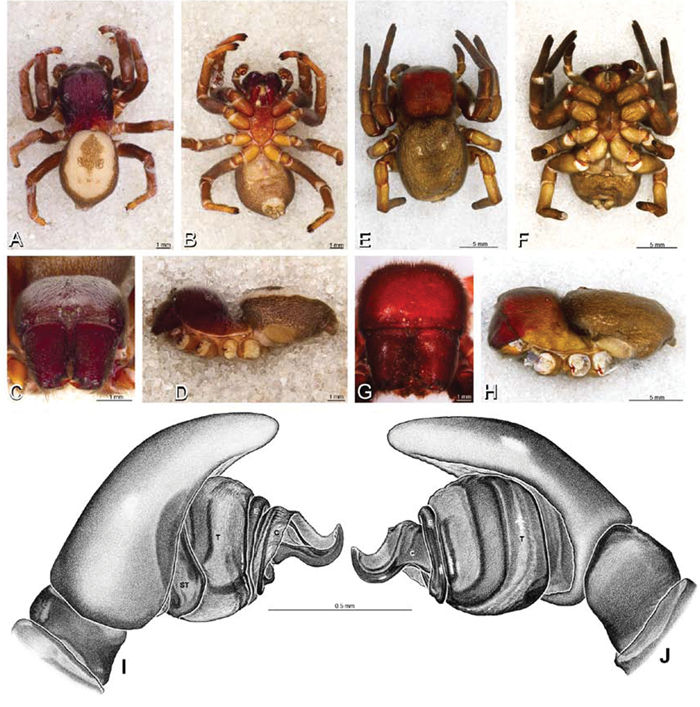
- D. fastuosus

Scientific classification
- Kingdom: Animalia
- Phylum: Arthropoda
- Subphylum: Chelicerata
- Class: Arachnida
- Order: Araneae
- Infraorder: Araneomorphae
- Family: Eresidae
- Genus: Dorceus; C. L. Koch, 1846

Type species
- D. fastuosus C. L. Koch, 1846

Species
- 5, see text

= Dorceus =

Genus of spiders

Dorceus is a genus of velvet spiders that was first described by C. L. Koch in 1846.

== Species ==
Genus Dorceus includes following species:

- Dorceus albolunulatus (Simon, 1876) – Algeria
- Dorceus fastuosus C. L. Koch, 1846 (type) – Tunisia, Senegal, Israel
- Dorceus latifrons Simon, 1873 – Algeria, Tunisia
- Dorceus quadrispilotus Simon, 1908 – Egypt
- Dorceus saif Szűts & Zamani, 2026 – Saudi Arabia
- Dorceus trianguliceps Simon, 1911 – Tunisia
