= Adonea =

Scientific classification
- Kingdom: Animalia
- Phylum: Arthropoda
- Subphylum: Chelicerata
- Class: Arachnida
- Order: Araneae
- Infraorder: Araneomorphae
- Family: Eresidae
- Genus: Adonea; Simon, 1873

Type species
- A. fimbriata Simon, 1873

Species
- A. algarvensis Wunderlich, 2017 – Portugal; A. algerica (El-Hennawy, 2004) – Algeria to Israel; A. fimbriata Simon, 1873 – Mediterranean

Synonyms
- Storkaniella Kratochvíl & Miller, 1940

Genus of spiders

Adonea is a genus of velvet spiders that was first described by Eugène Simon in 1873. As of May 2019 it contains only three species: A. algarvensis, A. algerica, and A. fimbriata.
