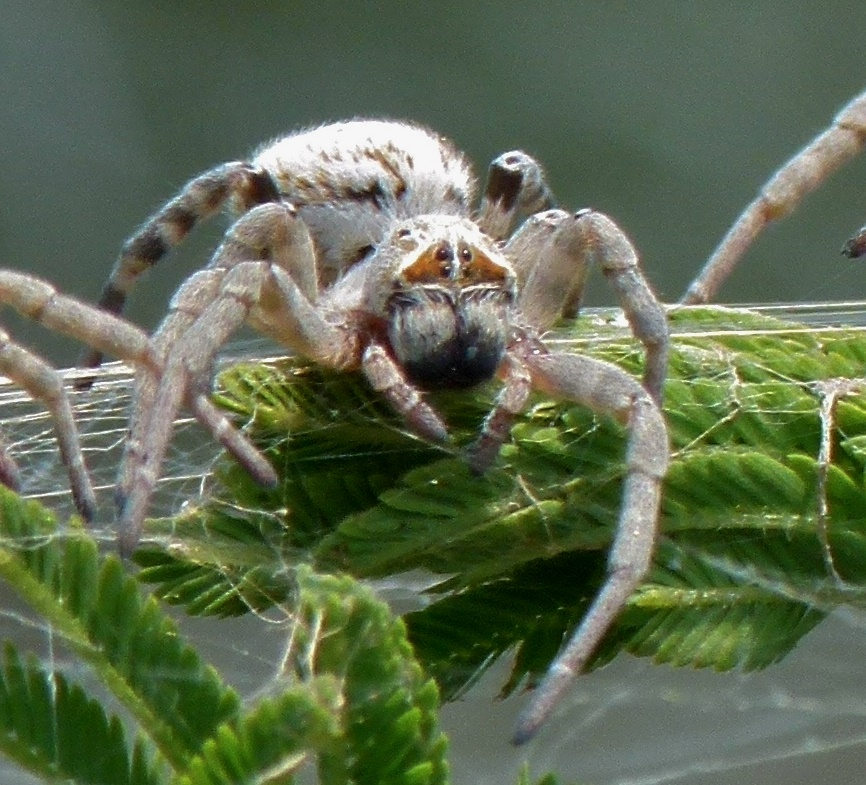
- Female Stegodyphus dumicola
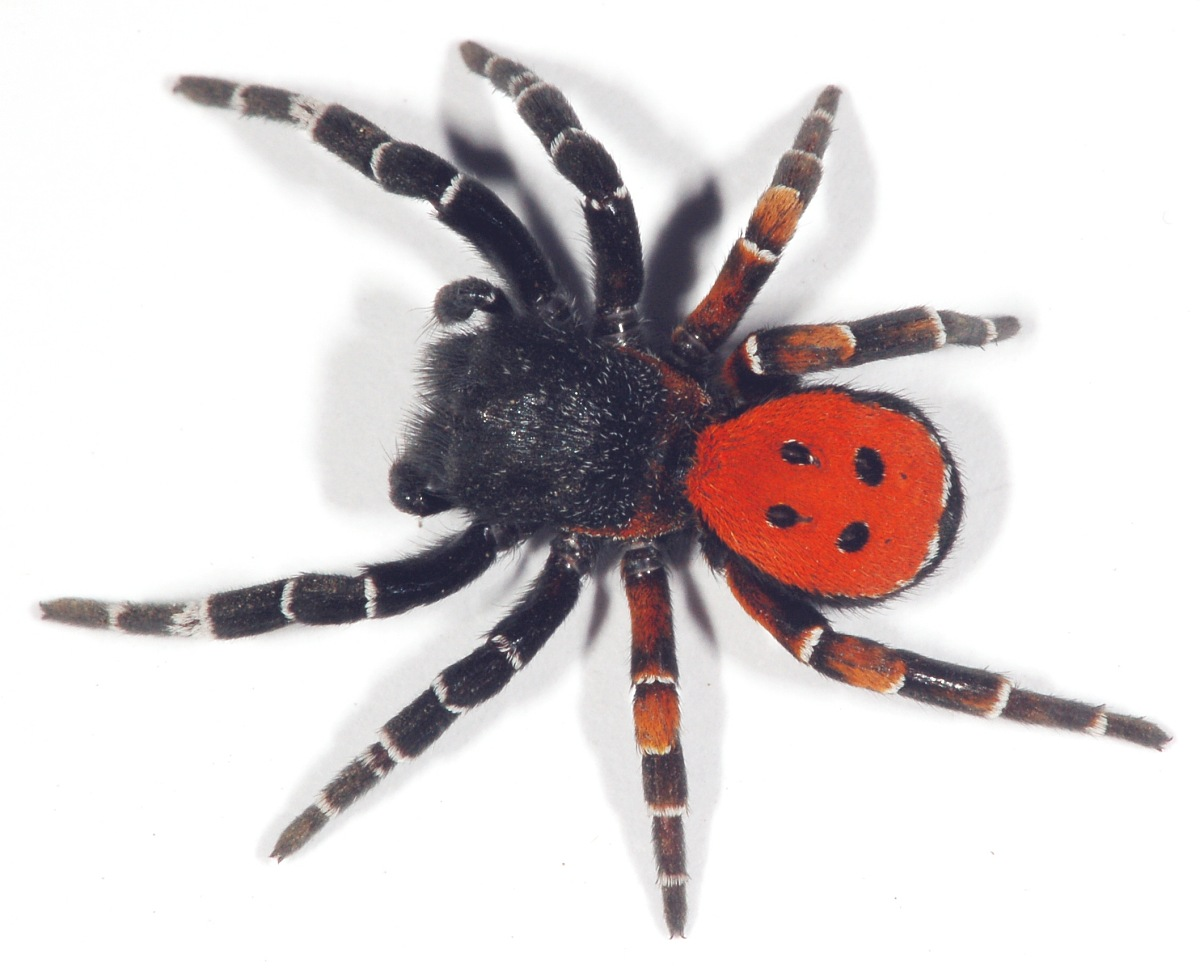
- Male Eresus kollari

Scientific classification
- Kingdom: Animalia
- Phylum: Arthropoda
- Subphylum: Chelicerata
- Class: Arachnida
- Order: Araneae
- Infraorder: Araneomorphae
- Family: Eresidae; C. L. Koch, 1845

Diversity
- 9 genera, 119 species
- blue: reported countries (WSC) green: observation hotspots (iNaturalist)

= Velvet spider =

Velvet spiders Temporal range: Miocene–present

Family of spiders

Velvet spiders (family Eresidae) are a small group (about 100 species in 9 genera) of spiders almost entirely limited to the Old World, with the exception of one species known from Brazil. In Europe, some are commonly called the ladybird spiders.

== Description ==
This family can sometimes be confused with the jumping spiders, or those in the Palpimanidae family. These spiders are usually black or brown in colour, though they can also have brighter colours as pictured. As their common name implies they can look quite smooth and velvety. They usually live in silken tubes under objects, or underground, but the genus Stegodyphus builds silken nests.

== Identification ==
The eye grouping for the Adonea genus, representative of the entire family.

They can be distinguished from most species except the Penestomidae by their semi-rectangular carapace and clypeal hood. They can be distinguished from Penestomidae by the eye arrangement, straight anterior eye row and strongly recurved posterior eye row, with the median eyes close together.

== Social behavior ==
Some species are nearly eusocial, lacking only a specialized caste system and a queen. They cooperate in brood rearing, unlike most other spiders except for some spitting spiders, African agelenid spiders in the genus Agelena, Monocentropus balfouri and a few others.

Female velvet spiders exhibit a remarkable type of maternal care unique among arachnids. Upon the birth of her brood, the mother spider liquefies her internal organs and regurgitates this material as food. Once her capability to liquefy her insides is exhausted, the young sense this and consume the mother.

Spiders of the genus Stegodyphus, such as Stegodyphus sarasinorum in India, are known for their elaborate and robust nests and their colony integrity.

== Genera ==
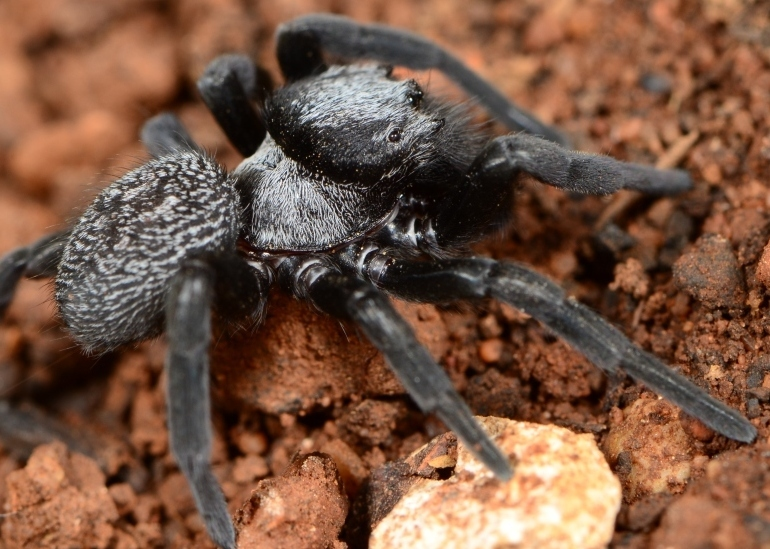
male Dresserus colsoni

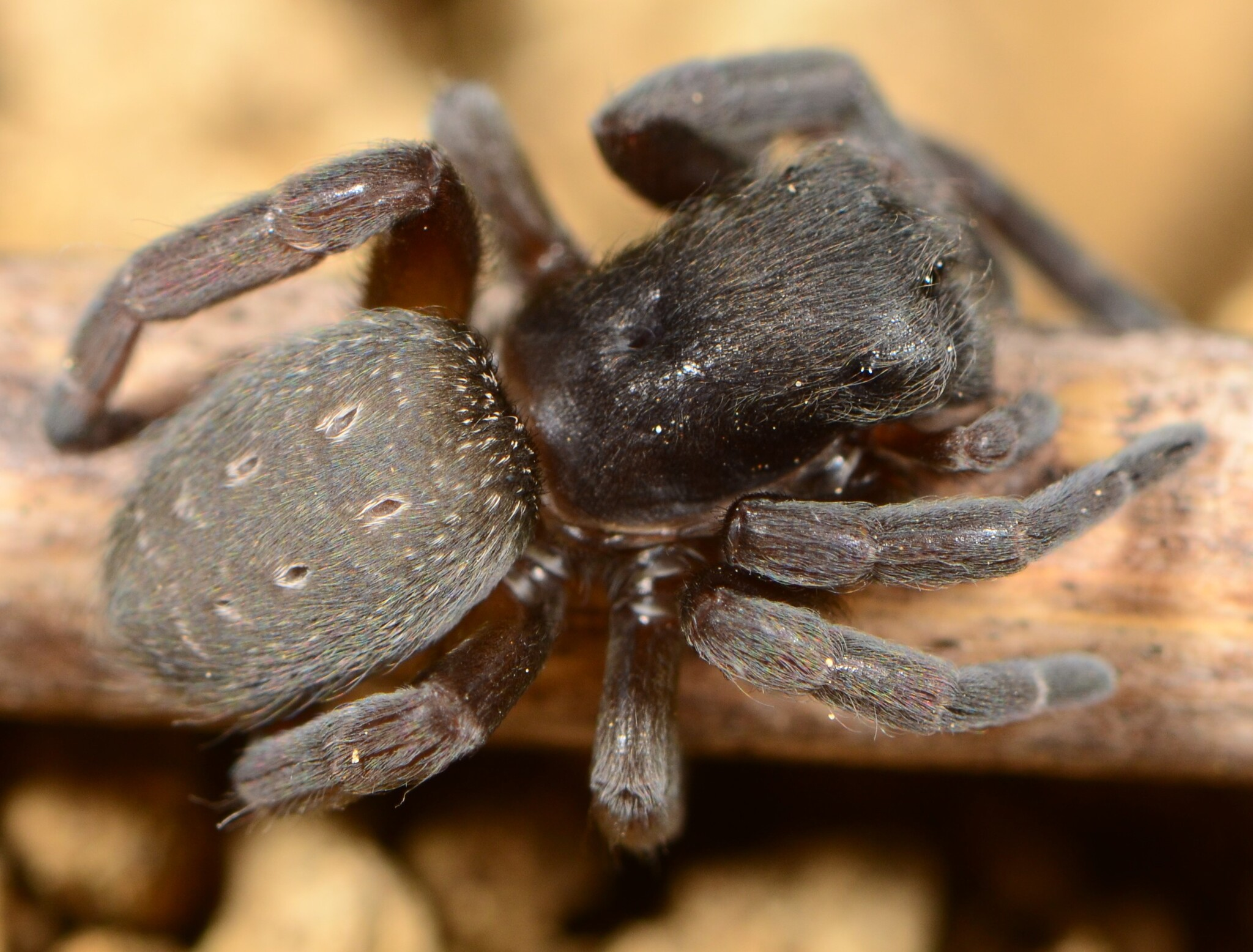
female Gandanameno purcelli

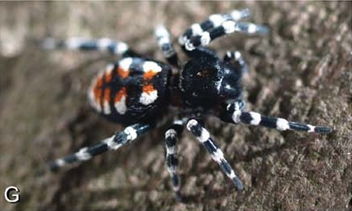
male Loureedia annulipes

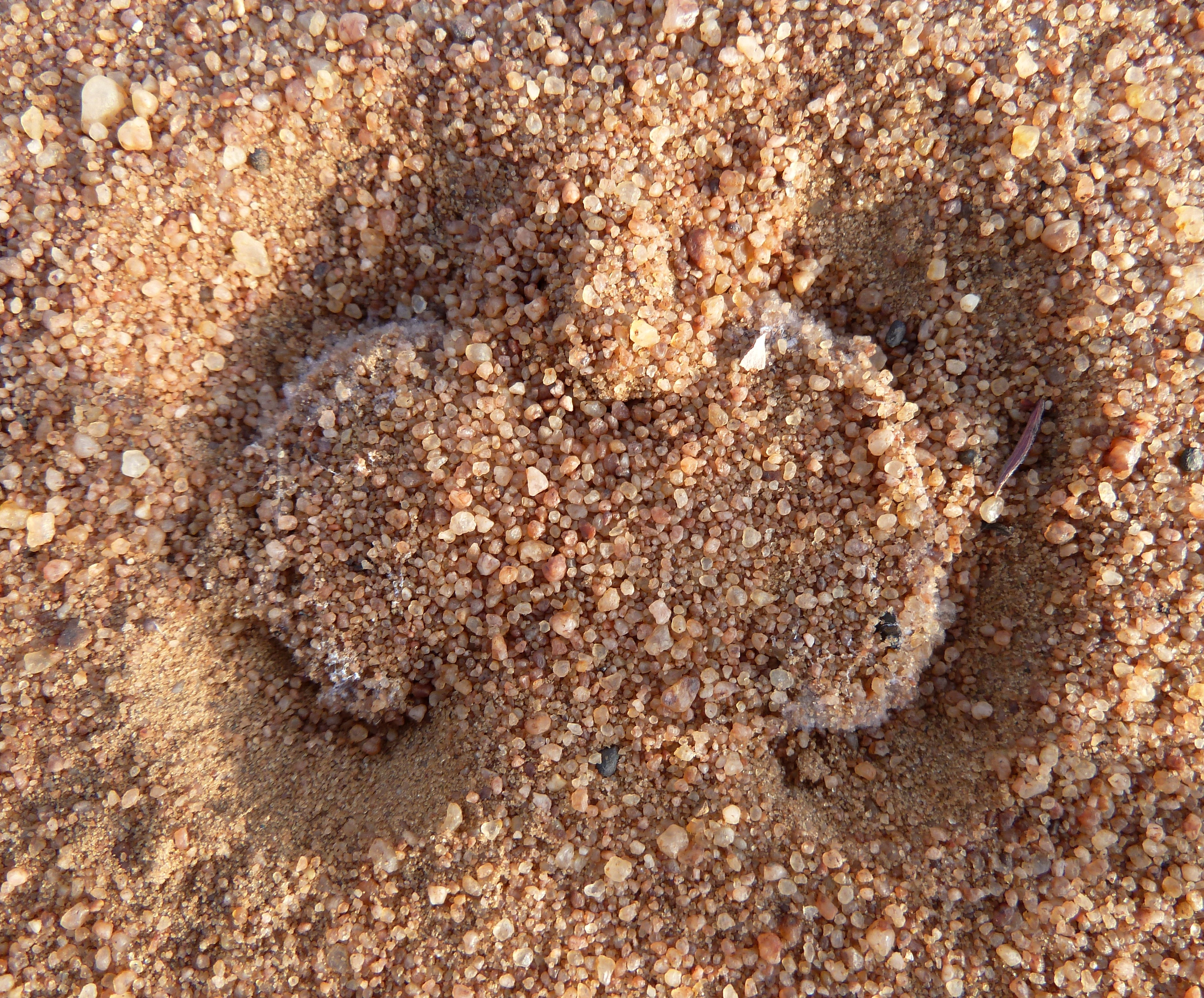
web of buck-door spider Seothyra fasciata

As of October 2025, this family includes nine genera and 119 species:

- Adonea Simon, 1873 – Algeria, Morocco?, Tunisia, Israel, Greece, Portugal
- Dorceus C. L. Koch, 1846 – Algeria, Egypt, Tunisia, Senegal, Israel
- Dresserus Simon, 1876 – Ethiopia, Uganda, Southern Africa, East Africa, Zanzibar
- Eresus Walckenaer, 1805 – Algeria, Egypt, Morocco, Asia, Europe
- Gandanameno Lehtinen, 1967 – Malawi, Namibia, South Africa, Zimbabwe
- Loureedia Miller, Griswold, Scharff, Řezáč, Szűts & Marhabaie, 2012 – Northern Africa, Iran, Israel, Spain
- Paradonea Lawrence, 1968 – Southern Africa
- Seothyra Purcell, 1903 – Angola, Botswana, Namibia, South Africa
- Stegodyphus Simon, 1873 – Africa, Asia, Brazil, North Africa to Tajikistan

The genus Penestomus was previously placed in Eresidae as the subfamily Penestominae, but was elevated to its own family, Penestomidae, in 2010.
