= List of Deadly 60 episodes =

The following is a list of Deadly 60 episodes.

== Series 1 (2009) ==
Episode	Title	Synopsis
1	South Africa 1	The first episode is set in South Africa. Steve Backshall looks at hippopotamuses, meeting a very special hippo called Jessica before kayaking to look for more hippos. He gets trapped by two hippos in a river but his crew manages to save him. Next he goes to a reptile park to see rock pythons, black mambas and rinkhals and chooses one for his list (the black mamba). Next Steve looks for invertebrates such as baboon spiders and African rock scorpions. He then finds the fat-tailed scorpion and puts that on the Deadly 60. Featured animals: hippopotamus, rock python, black mamba, rinkhals, baboon spider, African rock scorpion, fat-tailed scorpion, geography cone, shark eye, bat star, aardvark, Indian pangolin, southern hairy-nosed wombat, hairy-tailed mole, rough-haired golden mole, bat-eared fox, nine-banded armadillo, ground pangolin, aardwolf, black drongo, kit fox, bengal fox, maned wolf, cape fox
2	South Africa 2	Steve continues exploring South Africa and goes to an animal sanctuary and looks at African fish eagles. One called Bonno which lives in captivity goes fishing for plastic fish. After Steve watches this he tries his own hand at fishing and massively fails. Steve puts the African fish eagle on the Deadly 60. As Steve starts leaving he picks up the local newspaper and reads about a girl getting attacked by a Nile crocodile in her swimming pool. Steve decides to look at them close up and see if they can make the Deadly 60. Next he sneaks up on impala, giraffe and wildebeest and tries to see if he can match their ability to stalk and catch prey but fails. He wants to see if the African hunting dogs are better. He goes in a plane searching for some dogs but doesn't find any. He puts them on the Deadly 60 anyway. Featured animals: African fish eagle, golden orb weaver, Nile crocodile, African hunting dog
3	South Africa 3	This is the last visit to South Africa of the season. Steve plans to look for great white sharks, and after a decision to head inland because of bad weather that would potentially frustrate his plans, and Steve goes inland and after walking with a honey badger called Buster he gets friendly with Buster and gets attacked (sort of), and after calling it fearless, puts it on the Deadly 60, then checks out a wildlife sanctuary where a meerkat bites him, a springbok runs at him with its horns extended out in front and then he meets a bat-eared fox, which he calls too cute to make the Deadly 60 and then he meets a caracal. He says these are great predators and after getting close to one and strokes it, being very careful as of his luck with the other animals, but the caracal attacks him anyway and Steve decides caracals deserve to be on the Deadly 60. Next he decides not to go out to look for sharks just yet, and looks at stingrays instead, close relatives of sharks. He feeds some off the coast of Cape Town, and explains that because they killed Steve Irwin, the last man who would want stingrays hated because of what happened to him, they won't be going on the Deadly 60, and instead after a while goes out on a boat looking for sharks. He goes shark-feeding with shark bait and sees one, but decides not to get wet with one. However, great white sharks manage to go on the Deadly 60. Featured animals: honey badger, meerkat, springbok, bat-eared fox, caracal, great white shark, stingray, African clawless otter
4	Australia 1	Steve goes to Western Australia to look for deadly animals. He starts on the outskirts of Perth and a local helps him search for tiger snakes. The local finds a large skink, but they have not found tiger snakes. They go to a local park and find eight tiger snakes. He then shows a reconstruction of a man dying of a tiger snake bite, Steve catches one. He says they are more venomous than cobras, but they look like cobras; they have a hood and are possibly very close to cobras. The tiger snake then is put on the Deadly 60. Next Steve goes out to sea to catch fish hunters and looks at Australian sea lions and pelicans, the latter going on the Deadly 60. Next Steve looks at bottlenose dolphins which have bigger brains than humans and Steve discovers they are good predators definitely going on the Deadly 60. Featured animals: skink, tiger snake, Australian sea lion, pelican, bottlenose dolphin
5	Australia 2	Steve travels to Queensland, Australia and starts by flying over the suffer canes and then shows cane toads, but doesn't put them on the Deadly 60. Featured animals: cane toad, paralysis tick, spectacled flying fox, stinging nettle, catsnake, forest bearded dragon, lace monitor, redback spider
6	Australia 3	This program focuses on South Australia. Featured animals: yellowfin tuna, duck-billed platypus, eastern grey kangaroo, funnel web spider, jack jumper ant, Australian giant cuttlefish
7	Australia 4	The final program from Australia goes to the Northern Territory where Steve looks at nocturnals. Featured animals: saltwater crocodile, whistling kite, frilled lizard, ghost bat
8	India 1	Steve goes to India to look for deadly animals. Featured animals: mugger crocodile, Russell's viper, king cobra, saw-scaled viper, sloth bear, langur monkey, praying mantis
9	India 2	Steve uses this episode to continue his studies of India. Featured animals: gharial, Asian elephant, Bengal tiger
10	Borneo 1	Steve goes to Borneo, and to start looks for animals in the Gomantong Cave System. Featured animals: wrinkle-lipped bat, cockroach, scutigera centipede, Reticulated Python
11	Borneo 2	Steve goes to the Bornean sea and looks for deadly animals. Featured animals: crocodilefish, frogfish, lionfish, mantis shrimp, chevron barracuda
12	United Kingdom 1	Steve goes back home to the UK, and this time looks at the deadliest animals his home has to offer. First is a battle in Wales. Featured animals: gannet, sand lizard, common lizard, grass snake, slow worm, smooth snake, adder, giant hornet, goshawk
13	United Kingdom 2	This episode continues the search for deadly animals in the United Kingdom. Featured animals: common otter, great raft spider, peregrine falcon
14	Alaska USA	Steve goes to Alaska to look at deadly animals. Featured animals: Arctic fox, wolverine, polar bear, bald eagle, salmon, brown bear
15	Arizona USA	Steve heads to the Arizonan desert. Featured animals: owl, Harris hawk, black bear, mountain lion, Gila monster, tiger rattlesnake
16	Louisiana USA	Steve goes to Louisiana's swamp and looks at many deadly animals. Featured animals: catfish, alligator gar, red soldier ant, cottonmouth, armadillo, American alligator, alligator snapping turtle
17	Bahamas	Shark Special - Steve Backshall looks at sharks in a trip to the Bahamas. Featured animals: Caribbean reef shark, tiger shark, great hammerhead, lemon shark
18	Brazil 1	Steve goes to the Brazilian savannah to meet deadly contenders for his list. Featured animals: giant anteater, burrowing owl
19	Brazil 2	Steve goes to the Brazilian flooded forests to find the deadliest animals there. Featured animals: fer de lance, red-bellied piranha, giant candiru, pink river dolphin
20	Brazil 3	Steve finishes his journey by looking for the last two Deadly 60 animals. Featured animals: whip spider, Goliath birdeater, vampire bat, fresh water crab, poison dart frog, army ant
21	Killers	Steve shows us the handful of Deadly 60 animals which would kill a human.
22	Weapons	Steve looks at the animals on the Deadly 60 and their weapons.
23	Unseen	Steve Backshall shows all the deadly animals he just didn't put on the Deadly 60.
24	Behind the Scenes	Steve shows the viewers who tune in how his favourite animal encounters were made.
25	The Making of South America and Alaska	Steve shows how the crew filmed the Brazil episodes and the Alaska episode.
26	Endangered	Steve meets all the endangered Deadly 60 animals.

== Series 2 (2010) ==
Episode	Title	Synopsis
1	Baja California, Mexico	Steve Backshall meets the deadly animals in Baja California, Mexico to start his new Deadly 60. Featured animals: Humboldt squid, tarantula, tarantula hawk wasp, rattlesnake
2	British Columbia	Steve goes to British Columbia to see potentially deadly sea creatures. Featured animals: wolf eel, Pacific giant octopus, orca
3	Vancouver	Featured animals: Steller's sea lion, orca, skunk, raccoon, American black bear
4	Costa Rica 1	Steve shows the audience the deadliest animals in Costa Rica. Featured animals: fer de lance, American crocodile, jaguar, peccary
5	Costa Rica 2	Steve continues the studies of Costa Rica. Featured animals: boa constrictor, eyelash viper, bushmaster, poison dart frog, vampire bat
6	Panama	Steve visits Panama on the search for the elusive harpy eagle. Featured animals: glossy racer snake, peccary, bullet ant, harpy eagle
7	Mozambique	Steve visits the coast of Mozambique. Featured animals: zooplankton, whale shark, solifuge, marlin, crown-of-thorns starfish
8	South Africa	Steve revisits South Africa to show deadly animals not shown last series of Deadly 60. Featured animals: blacktip reef shark, African honeybee, ragged tooth shark, dassie, black eagle
9	Namibia 1	Steve goes to Namibia's Namib desert and shows deadly Namibians. Featured animals: spoor spider, dune ant, shovel-snouted lizard, sidewinder, vulture
10	Namibia 2	Steve is on the search for Namibia's Big Cats. Featured animals: leopard, lion, porcupine, warthog, giraffe
11	Madagascar	Steve visits Madagascar to view the Deadly Animals there. Featured animals: fossa, cicada, chameleon, leaf-tailed gecko, aye-aye
12	Uganda	Here Steve shows people how deadly primates can be. Featured animals: gorilla, baboon, chimpanzee, giant earthworm
13	Thailand	In Thailand Steve tries to find the Deadliest animals it has to offer. Featured animals: king cobra, clouded leopard, Tokay gecko
14	Philippines 1	Steve continues his adventure for the Deadly 60 in the Philippines. Featured animals: water monitor, tarantula, whip spider, pangolin, mangrove catsnake
15	Philippines 2	Steve continues his studies in the Philippines. Featured animals: thresher shark, yellow-bellied sea krait, tarsier
16	Dogs and Wolves, Norway, UK and Romania	In this episode Steve focuses on dogs. Featured animals: Alaskan husky, rottweiler rescue dog, German shepherd police dog, grey wolf, brown bear, He also visits Norway
17	Norway	Steve goes to the frozen north of Norway to see what deadly animals there are in its polar region. Featured animals: Arctic fox, lemming, musk ox, lynx, roe deer
18	United Kingdom (UK)	Steve sees what deadly animals his home land has to offer. Featured animals: pike, white-tailed sea eagle, crab spider, orb weaver
19	Argentina	Steve travels to Argentina to see the deadly animals that live in its swamp lands. Featured animals: spectacled caiman, capybara, fox, yellow-bellied piranha, yellow anaconda
20	Peru	Steve finishes his search in the wonders of the Amazon rainforest. Featured animals: giant otter, black caiman, yellow-tailed cribo
21	Making Of (Special)	Steve and the gang show how the TV show was made.
22	Tracks and Signs (Special)	Steve tells how we can track animals using tracks and signs.
23	Inside Deadly 60 (Special)	Steve focuses on showing viewers how animals survive by looking under the skin.
24	Unseen (Special)	Steve shows the animals he did not have time to show us. white lady spider, spoor spider (cameo), armored ground cricket, African hunting dog, millipede, scorpion, vervet monkey, tarsier, stork-billed kingfisher, shame-faced crab, velvet ant and Scolopendrium centipede
25	Venom (Special)	Steve tells us about venom, how it works and how to cure it
26	Endangered (Special)	Steve shows the endangered deadly animals

== Series 3 (2012) ==
Episode	Title	Synopsis
1	Indonesia	Steve Backshall travels to Indonesia where he and his crew have a nerve-racking close encounter when they are chased by a group of ravenous, three-metre-long Komodo dragons, the world's largest venomous lizards!
2	Ethiopia	Steve travels to Ethiopia to find the gelada baboons however first he has an experience of a lifetime, feeding wild hyenas in a medieval city with a local man. The hyenas have become used to this feeding after hundreds of years. He then travels into the mountains to find the geladas but accidentally runs into the extremely rare Ethiopian wolf along the way.
3	United Kingdom	Steve is on his home turf, scouring land, sea and air, for some of the deadliest critters that the UK has to offer. First, he heads for the seas off the coast of Plymouth, in search of monsters from the deep. And he's not disappointed! In the bowels of a wreck he comes face to face with a giant conger eel, one of the most feared predators in the ocean. Back on land he meets a double deadly killer, the dragonfly. As adults they are amazing aerial assassins, but they lead a double life. Finally, he takes a look at the kestrel, the world champion in hovering.
4	Alaska	Steve and the crew head into the beautiful Alaskan wilderness for another deadly adventure. It's the largest state in America, and is home to some of the most impressive predators on Earth.
5	South Africa 1	Steve's search for deadly animals takes him and the crew to South Africa. This time they're looking for one of the most iconic of them all, the ferocious great white shark.
6	Mexico 1	Steve Backshall and his team head to Mexico's Yucatán Peninsula where he embarks on a high-octane chase with the fastest fish in the sea, the sailfish, and marvels at the awesome hunting skills of the Mexican Night Snake
7	Australia 1	This time on Deadly 60, Steve and the crew are in Australia and it's Deadly to the extreme. Steve heads into the blistering sun of the outback to fulfil a lifelong dream of finding the most venomous land snake the Inland Taipan in the world. Then the crew head to Tasmania where Steve finds a devilish mammal called the Tasmanian Devil that will fly into a maniacal rage when competing for food. Also, he finally goes in search of a toxic terror living right in the heart of Sydney, diving into the harbour to hunt for the blue-ringed octopus - it might fit in the palm of your hand but one touch of this critter could mean game over.
8	New Zealand	For the first time on Deadly 60 Steve and the team head to New Zealand. Steve descends deep into the Waitomo Caves to find an unusual predator that lures insects to their death with a lethal light show, the glow-worm.
9	South Africa 2	This time on Deadly 60, Steve and the crew are back in South Africa, one of the deadly capitals of the world. He's taken out by the fastest feet on the planet when he goes up against a couple of cheetahs in a football game.
10	Australia 2	This time on Deadly 60, Steve and the crew are back in Australia, one of the deadly capitals of the world. He is slung under a helicopter into a nest of saltwater crocodiles and measures their bite but loses the bite test gauge!
11	South America 1	Steve and his crew are back in the jungles of South America for his Deadly 60 adventure. Steve heads into crocodile-infested waters for a spooky nocturnal encounter with a truly shocking predator, the electric eel.
12	Nepal	Steve and the crew head to the mountain kingdom of Nepal to search for more animal predators to add to the Deadly 60. Steve enlists the help of an elephant to track down a very grumpy rhinoceros.
13	Mexico 2	Steve and the crew return to Mexico in search of more animals to add to the Deadly 60. Steve searches a swamp at night for a rare and beautiful crocodile with a nasty bite, before heading to the stunning Mexican coastline.
14	Venezuela	This time Steve and the crew travel to Venezuela in search of more lethal animal predators for the Deadly list. First they comb the Venezuelan wetlands looking for the biggest snake in the world, the mighty green anaconda.
15	South America 2	Steve returns to South America. He joins a team trying to save a highly endangered predator, the Orinoco crocodile, and witnesses the ferocious maternal instincts of a female.
16	Sri Lanka 1	Steve heads to Sri Lanka where he attempts to free dive with the largest animal ever known to have lived, the Blue Whale. And back on dry land he goes in search of another giant, the Asian Elephant.
17	Sri Lanka 2	Steve Backshall and the crew continue their Sri Lankan adventure on the hunt for another three perfect predators to add to the Deadly 60.
18	Southern States	Steve visits the Southern States of the USA. He dives into the crystal clear waters of the Silver Springs River to swim with a wild alligator and adds his first plant to the Deadly 60, a carnivorous Venus flytrap.
19	Florida	Steve heads to Florida in the USA. He wades into a swamp to try and catch a slippery amphibian called the amphiuma and tracks down America's largest snake, the eastern diamondback rattlesnake.
20	Unseen	In this final episode of the series, wildlife adventurer Steve Backshall looks back at some unseen footage from the filming of Deadly 60.
21	Killer Shots	.
22	Parasites	.
23	Super Powers	.
24	Neighbours	.
25	Self Defence	.
26	Endangered	.

== Series 4 (2020) ==
On 17 February 2020, Steve Backshall announced on social media that the fourth season of Deadly 60 was coming on CBBC a week later.

Episode	Title	Synopsis
1	Rhino Rescue Special	Steve Backshall travels to South Africa and visits a Rhino conservation and see for himself the efforts to save these endangered animals. Backshall spends time with an anti-poaching team. Backshall ends his visit by helping to put a tracking collar on a Rhino.
2	Bali	Backshall goes in search of Pufferfish, Lionfish, Frogfish and Trumpetfish. Back on land, Backshall meets two sisters whose charity is helping to clean up Bali's beaches of plastic. Down on the beach, Backshall finds a highly-venomous banded sea krait. Back in the sea, Backshall finds a massive Ocean sunfish, believed to be the world's largest species of bony fish.
3	Gabon Jungle	Steve travels to Gabon's Loango National Park. Backshall goes in search of the elusive Dwarf crocodile, deep in the jungle he finds chimpanzees and see one that has caught a tortoise. Steve then has a close encounter with a Forest elephant.
4	Norway	Backshall heads to Norway to dive with one of the planet's ultimate predators - the Orca. Whilst diving for Orca some Humpback Whales are spotted. Steve has a look at Herring, which are one of the Orcas favourite fish.
5	South Africa	Steve Backshall is in South Africa, looking for the elusive Serval. Along the way he spots a Duiker (a small type of antelope). After finding a Serval steve then travels to a reptile rescue centre, and handles an African rock python. Backshall releases a highly venomous Mozambique spitting cobra. Next to make the Deadly 60 list is the Gaboon viper. Steve goes on the trail of the Golden baboon tarantula.
6	Ecuador Oceans	Steve travels to Ecuador, where he meets Pelicans and Frigate birds which are kleptoparasite (steal food or prey from another animal). Backshall is amazed when he sees a Giant Manta Ray, that is almost as big as his boat. Whilst diving he spots a large group of Mobula rays. Back on land, Steve visits a turtle sanctuary. Backshall then goes swimming with Humpback whales. During a night time dive he encounters a Pufferfish which is one of the most poisonous fish species, finds a Moray eel, turtles and removes a fishing line from a Green sea turtle.
7	Borneo	Cruising along the pitch-black river, Steve spots his first Deadly animal – a saltwater crocodile. He later catches a Reticulated python in the jungle. Backshall is shocked by the scale of deforestation on the island and the effect on the wildlife. Animals such as Sun bears and orangutans habitations are being threatened by deforestation in Borneo. Steve finds a female Reticulated python that has just given birth.
8	Shark Rescue Special	Steve is in The Bahamas to see the efforts being made to save sharks. During Steve's dive he encounters several Great hammerhead sharks. Backshall, then heads to Palm Beach, Florida, and spots a large shiver (group) of Blacktip sharks. Back in The Bahamas, Steve finds some Lemon, Nurse, Bull and Tiger sharks during his dive.
9	Ecuador Jungle	Steve Backshall travels to the Ecuador jungle, looking for species to add to the deadly list. His first find is a not so deadly Crested Forest Toad. Steve spots what he thinks is a Fer-de-lance, but is the similar looking Mock Viper. Backshall feed a black caiman that has made the area near his camp its home. During a boat trip, Steve catches a Piranha, that he adds to the Deadly 60 list. A massive Goliath bird-eating spider is found in the jungle. After handling a Whip spider, Backshall encounters the highly dangerous Wandering spider, which has the longest venom glands of any spider. Steve and the crew find a highly venomous Fer-de-lance in their camp.
10	Gabon Coast	Steve Backshall is in Gabon's Loango National Park to find more animals for the deadly list. In the jungle, Steve spots some western lowland gorillas, a critically endangered species. Steve and the crew go in search of Nile crocodiles. During a nighttime wonder through the jungle, a leaf is found full of Tiger Beetles. Backshall gets to grips with a large African Rock Python. The next day, Steve plays back the footage from a camera trap that he had put out the day before near a crocodile nest, but is surprise to see an Ornate Monitor Lizard.

== Series 5 (2024) ==
Episode	Title	Synopsis
1	Braving The Bait Balls	Steve searches for wildlife events which can be seen from space, but not easy to find.
2	Big Cat Special	
3	Very Hungry Hippos	
4	Steve's River Expedition	
5	Saving the Pangolins	
6	The Deep	
7	Giant Otter Stakeout	
8	South America’s Weirdest	
9	Sharks and Eels	
10	Saving Wild Dogs	
11	Mexico Mayhem	

== Series 6 (2025) ==
Episode	Title	Synopsis
1	Cheetah Special	In Zambia, Backshall witnesses the hunting habits of Cheetahs, and the challenges faced from other predators. After visiting a local Wildlife conservation group, Backshall returns to the savannah, where he finds an Anchieta's Cobra.
2	Saving Sharks	Backshall begins this Shark special in Jervis Bay, New South Wales, Australia, where he finds grey nurse sharks and an Ornate Wobbegong. In Lombok, Indonesia, Backshall meets Madison Stewart, a Shark conservationist who is working with locals to protect the various Shark species in the area. He also takes the opportunity to dive with Whale Sharks.
3	Ocean Oddballs	In the waters off Sulawesi, Backshall finds some its weirdest creatures including: Striped catfish, Stargazer fish, Flamboyant cuttlefish, and Hairy frogfish. After an encounter with Crested black macaques, Backshal is back in the water to observe more unusual marine creatures, such as: Mimic octopus, Bobbit worms, a Coconut octopus and a scorpionfish.
4	Bat Spectacular	Backshall heads to the Kasanka National Park in Zambia which is home to millions of Straw-coloured fruit bats. The bats are also prey for African Fish Eagles, Crowned Eagles, and Martial Eagles. Back at camp, Backshall finds a Solifugae, also known as a Camel Spider.
5	Dragons and Death Adders	In the waters off Western Australia, Backshall finds a Fiddler Ray, Horn Shark and a Weedy Seadragon. Back on land, Backshall encounters some of the area's predators, including; a Burton's Legless Lizard, a Rough-scaled Snake, a Huntsman Spider, and a Death Adder. Later, he meets a spider expert who creates life-saving Sydney funnel-web spider antivenom.
6	Jaguar Special	Backshall is in Brazil's Pantanal, home to the Jaguar; where he witnesses them hunt Yacare caiman and Capybara.
7	Camouflage Killers	Backshall visits Queensland's, Springbrook National Park where he sees a Golden-crowned snake, a Trapdoor spider, and a Leaf-tailed gecko. After a visit to the coast to find a highly venomous Stone fish, Backshall heads back inland where he finds a Raft spider, a Bush cricket (also known as a katydid) and Amethystine pythons.
8	Meerkat Madness	Backshall travels to the Kalahari Desert to witness Meerkat behaviour. Elsewhere on the savanna, he catches a glimpse of a Sengi. After earlier spotting an Aardwolf, Backshall and his team spot a Caracal and an Aardvark during a night safari.
9	Otter Hide and Seek	Backshall is back in Brazil's Pantanal, and is in search of the Giant River Otter. Along the way, he freedives with Caiman and Piranha. Later, he visits an animal rehabilitation centre before seeing conservation efforts helping to protect Hyacinth Macaws.
10	Snake Island	Backshall begins his journey in São Paulo, a city being plagued by highly venomous Brazilian yellow scorpions. At the Butantan Institute, he meets a venom expert who believes the scorpion-eating Yellow Cururu toad could be the answer to the city's scorpion problem. On Snake Island, Backshall discovers that poaching has caused a large reduction in the number of Golden Lancehead vipers on the island.

== Series 7 (2026) ==
Episode	Title	Synopsis
1	Bears and Vipers in Slovenia	Deep in the Slovenian countryside, Backshall encounters a Horn-nosed Viper. Later, he descends deep underground to find Olms, a type of aquatic salamander. Back in the countryside, Backshal joins a group of bear experts to observe Brown Bear behavior.
2	Blue Whales and Saltwater Crocodiles	Off the coast of Timor-Leste, Backshall and his team are on the lookout for Blue Whale. While on land, a 5m long Saltwater Crocodile is spotted. Later, Backshall finally gets the chance to dive with a Blue Whale.
3	Secretive Puma Special	Backshall is in search of the elusive Puma in Chile's Torres del Paine National Park.
4	Slow Loris and King Cobras	Backshall travels to Indonesia to film three of its deadliest species: Reticulated Python, Slow Loris, and King Cobra.
5	Puffins and Dragonflies	Backshall is in Great Britain to observe the behavior of: Dragonflies, Hobbies, and Puffins
6	Saving Coral Reefs	Backshall visits Indonesia and the Maldives to see first-hand the work being done by two Coral Reef conservation projects.
7	Leopard Sharks and Octopus	In waters off Oman, Backshall dives in search of some of its many predators, including: Moray Eel, Cuttlefish, Octopus, and Leopard Shark.
8	Giant Sea Lions and Chilean Bullfrog	In Chile, Backshall is surprised to see how Giant sea lions interact with locals. He then visits the protected island of Isla de Cachagua to see its colony of Humboldt penguins. Later, Backshall joins a group of frog experts who are studying Chilean Helmeted Bullfrogs — one of the largest species of frog in the world.
9	Peacock Jumping Spider	In this micro-predators special, Backshall is in search of some of nature's smallest predators, including: Peacock Jumping Spider, Seahorse, Blue Ribbon Eel, Whip Spider, and Deathstalker scorpion.
10	Wolves and Sharks	Backshall is in Oman to see how: Camel, Arabian Wolf, Verreaux's eagle, and Indo-Pacific bottlenose dolphin survive in the region's hostile environment.
