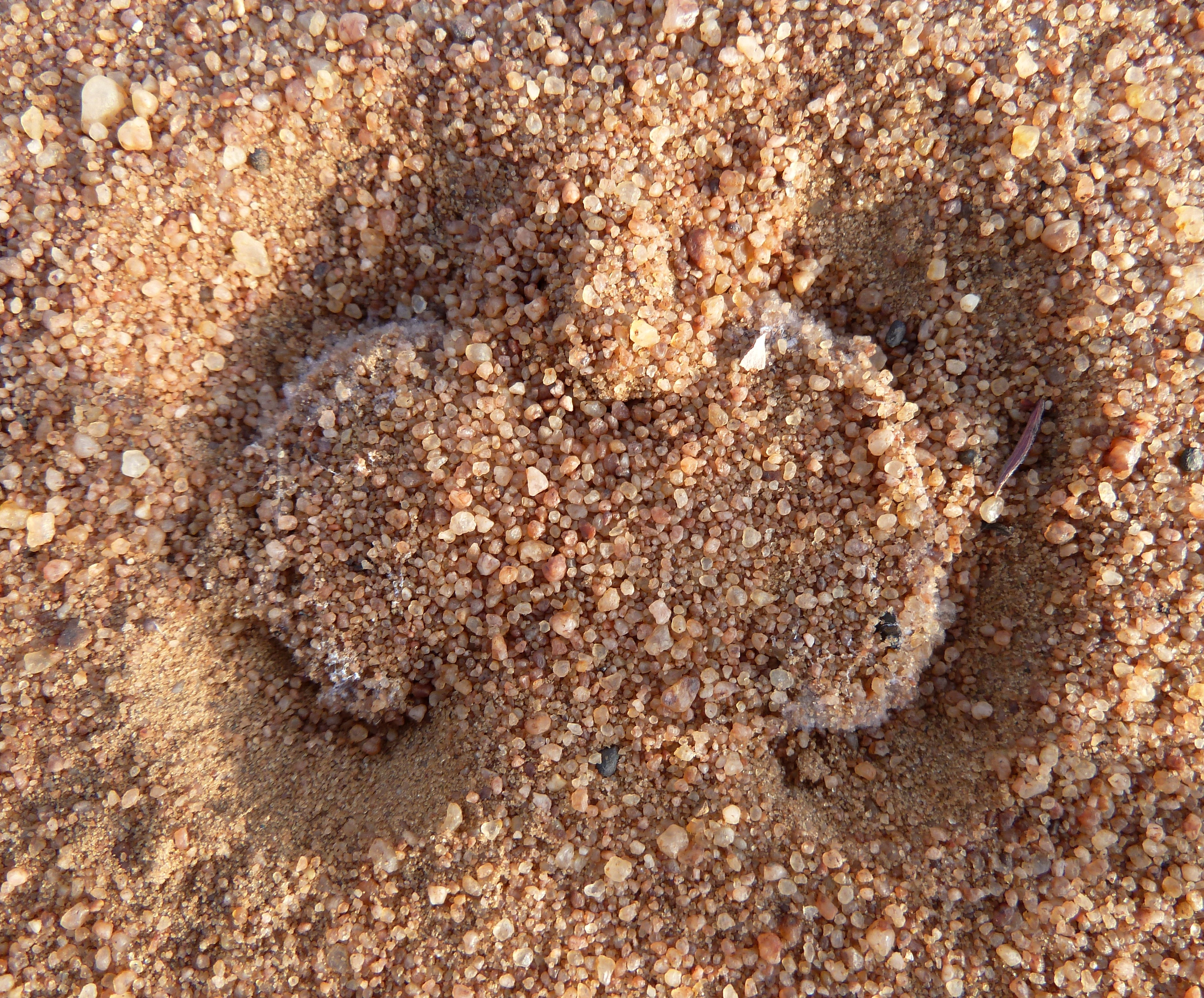
- Capture webs of a S. fasciata female

Conservation status
- Least Concern (SANBI Red List)

Scientific classification
- Kingdom: Animalia
- Phylum: Arthropoda
- Subphylum: Chelicerata
- Class: Arachnida
- Order: Araneae
- Infraorder: Araneomorphae
- Family: Eresidae
- Genus: Seothyra
- Species: S. fasciata

Binomial name
- Seothyra fasciata Purcell, 1904
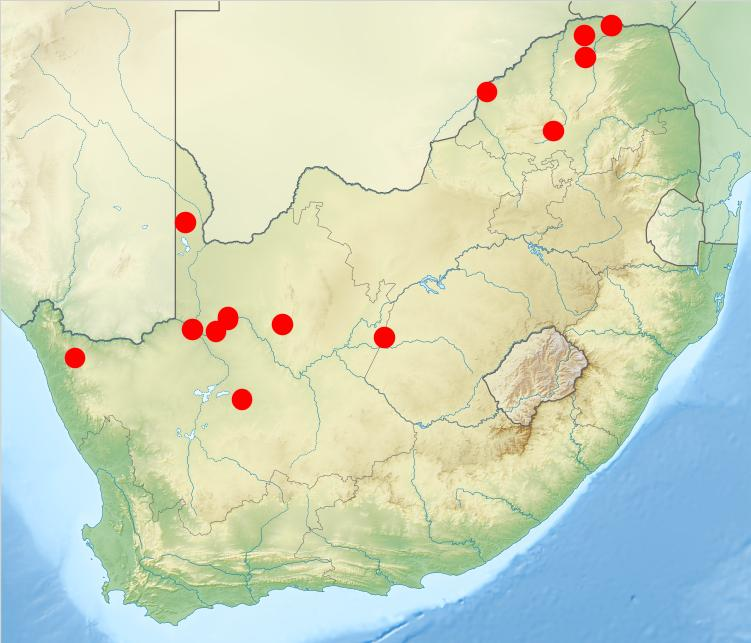
- ● range records for South Africa

= Seothyra fasciata =

Gordonia buckspoor spider

Species of spider

Seothyra fasciata is a sand-dwelling species of spider from the family Eresidae. It is found in Namibia, Botswana, and South Africa, where it is commonly known as the Gordonia buckspoor spider.

== Distribution ==
Seothyra fasciata occurs in three Southern African countries: sandy regions of southern Namibia, Botswana, and northern South Africa. In South Africa, the species is recorded from two provinces: Limpopo and Northern Cape.

Notable locations include Augrabies National Park, Benfontein Game Reserve, Kgalagadi Transfrontier Park, Mosdene Nature Reserve, Vhembe Biosphere Reserve, and Witsand Nature Reserve.

== Habitat and ecology ==
The species inhabits multiple biomes including Succulent Karoo, Savanna, and Nama Karoo biomes at altitudes ranging from 540 to 1,197 m above sea level.

Seothyra fasciata constructs distinctive burrow retreat-webs consisting of a silk-lined burrow. The entrance is covered with a lobed silk flap that serves as a signal web, with the upper part covered in sand to resemble a hoofprint or buck spoor in the sand.

== Description ==
Seothyra fasciata is known from both sexes.

== Conservation ==
Seothyra fasciata is listed as Least Concern by the South African National Biodiversity Institute due to its wide geographical range. It is protected in six protected areas and faces no significant threats.

== Taxonomy ==
The species was originally described by William Frederick Purcell in 1904. It was revised by Dippenaar-Schoeman in 1991.
