= Seothyra schreineri =

Schreiner's Buckspoor Spider

Conservation status
- Least Concern (SANBI Red List)

Scientific classification
- Kingdom: Animalia
- Phylum: Arthropoda
- Subphylum: Chelicerata
- Class: Arachnida
- Order: Araneae
- Infraorder: Araneomorphae
- Family: Eresidae
- Genus: Seothyra
- Species: S. schreineri

Binomial name
- Seothyra schreineri Purcell, 1903

Species of spider

Seothyra schreineri is a species of spider in the family Eresidae. It is found in Namibia and South Africa, where it is commonly known as Schreiner's Buckspoor Spider.

== Distribution ==
Seothyra schreineri occurs in Namibia and South Africa. In South Africa, the species is recorded from three provinces, Free State, Northern Cape, and Western Cape.

The species is found in Augrabies National Park, Karoo National Park, and Witsand Nature Reserve.

== Habitat and ecology ==
The species inhabits Desert, Nama Karoo and Succulent Karoo biomes at altitudes ranging from 581 to 1,402 m above sea level.

Seothyra schreineri constructs burrow retreat-webs consisting of a silk-lined burrow. The entrance is covered with a lobed silk flap that serves as a signal web, with the upper part covered in sand to resemble a hoofprint or buck spoor in the sand. Males wander in search of mates.

== Description ==
Seothyra schreineri is known from both sexes. It is the type species of the genus Seothyra.

== Conservation ==
Seothyra schreineri is listed as Least Concern by the South African National Biodiversity Institute due to its wide geographical range. It is protected in Karoo National Park, Witsand Nature Reserve and Augrabies National Park.

== Taxonomy ==
The species was originally described by William Frederick Purcell in 1903 from Hanover in the Northern Cape. It was revised by Dippenaar-Schoeman in 1991.
