= Cacophis churchilli =

Conservation status
- Least Concern (IUCN 3.1)

Scientific classification
- Kingdom: Animalia
- Phylum: Chordata
- Class: Reptilia
- Order: Squamata
- Suborder: Serpentes
- Family: Elapidae
- Genus: Cacophis
- Species: C. churchilli

Binomial name
- Cacophis churchilli Wells and Wellington, 1985

Species of snake

Cacophis churchilli is a species of elapid snake. Its common name is northern dwarf crowned snake. Its range is the wet tropics of Queensland between Townsville and Cooktown.
