= Seothyra perelegans =

Scientific classification
- Kingdom: Animalia
- Phylum: Arthropoda
- Subphylum: Chelicerata
- Class: Arachnida
- Order: Araneae
- Infraorder: Araneomorphae
- Family: Eresidae
- Genus: Seothyra
- Species: S. perelegans

Binomial name
- Seothyra perelegans Simon, 1906

Species of spider

Seothyra perelegans is a species of spider in the family Eresidae. It is endemic to South Africa.

== Distribution ==
Seothyra perelegans is endemic to South Africa. The species is recorded from two provinces: Eastern Cape and Free State, with locations including Willowmore and Bothaville.

== Habitat and ecology ==
The species has been sampled from Grassland and Nama Karoo biomes at altitudes ranging from 815 to 1,291 m above sea level.

The species constructs burrow retreat-webs consisting of a silk-lined burrow. Males wander in search of mates.

== Description ==
Seothyra perelegans is known only from the male.

== Conservation ==
Seothyra perelegans is listed as Data Deficient for taxonomic reasons. The species has a restricted distribution. More sampling is needed to collect the female and more accurately determine the species' range.

== Taxonomy ==
The species was originally described by Eugène Simon in 1906 from Bothaville. It was revised by Dippenaar-Schoeman in 1991.
