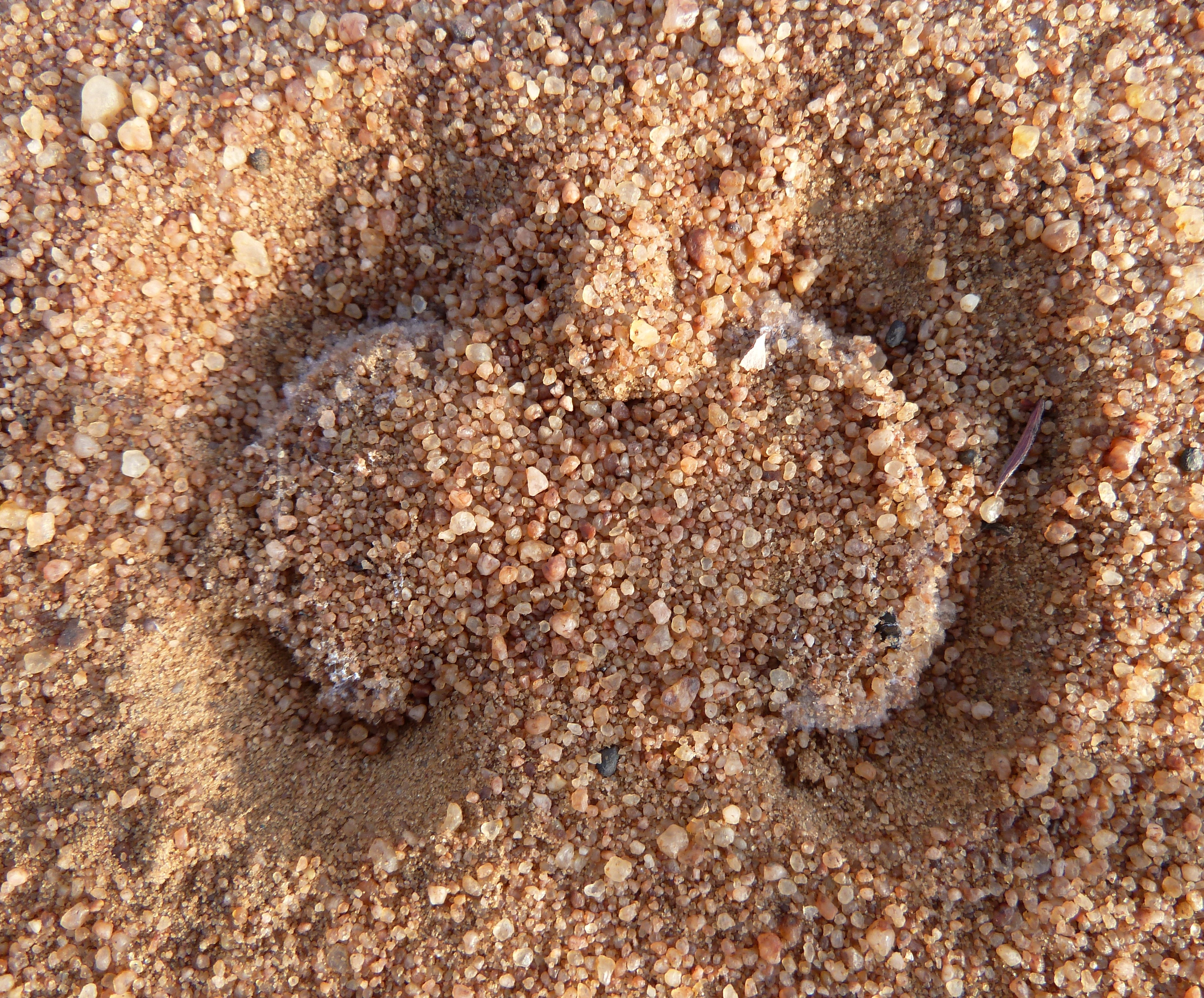
- The symmetrical capture webs covering the burrow of a Seothyra fasciata female
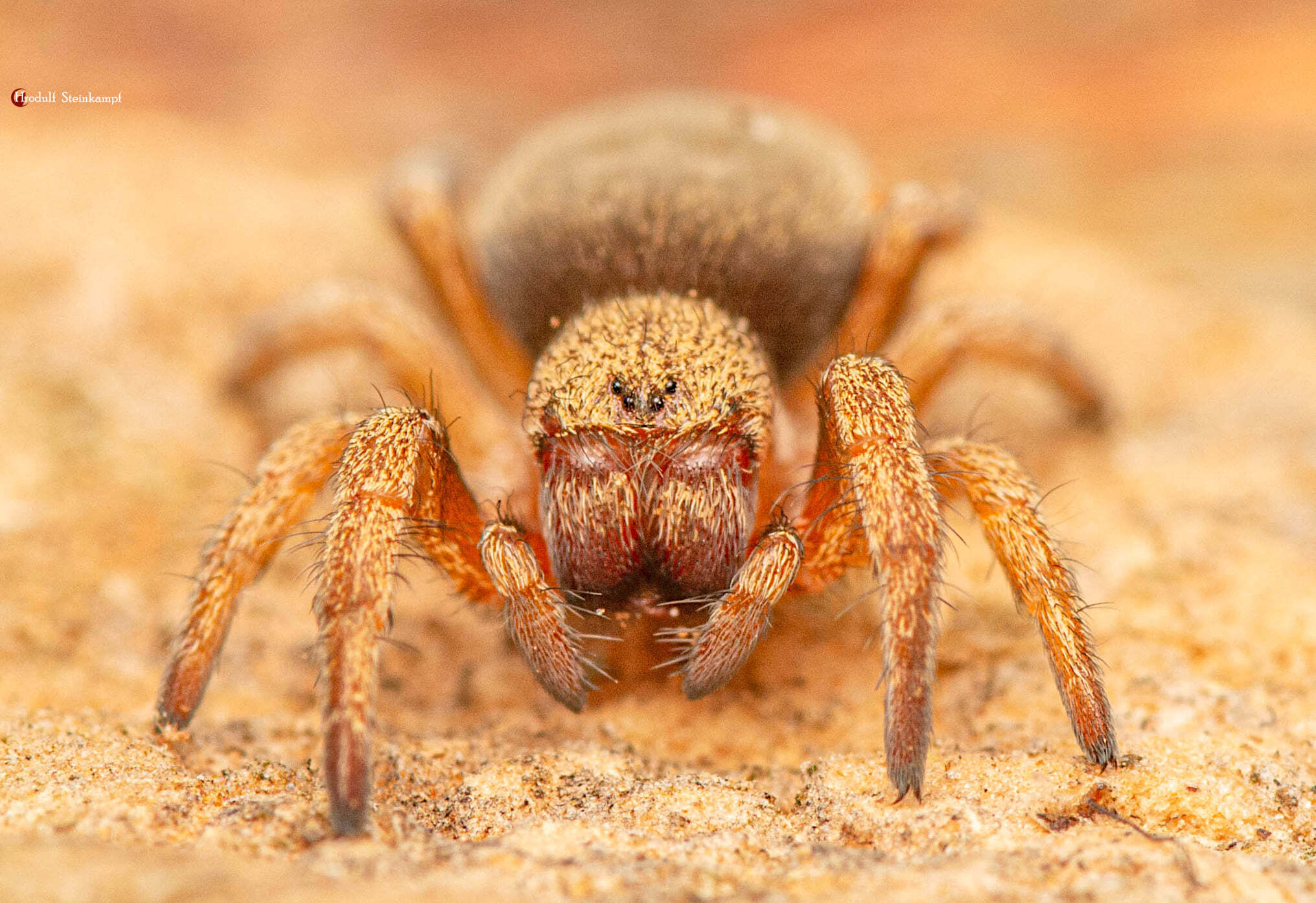
- female Seothyra sp. from South Africa

Scientific classification
- Kingdom: Animalia
- Phylum: Arthropoda
- Subphylum: Chelicerata
- Class: Arachnida
- Order: Araneae
- Infraorder: Araneomorphae
- Family: Eresidae
- Genus: Seothyra; Purcell, 1903

Type species
- Seothyra schreineri Purcell, 1903

Species
- See text

Diversity
- 13 species

= Seothyra =

Buckspoor spiders

Genus of spiders

Seothyra, commonly known as the buckspoor spiders, buck spoor spiders or just spoor spiders, belong to a sand-dwelling, burrowing genus of araneomorph spiders in the family Eresidae. The 13 species are endemic to the arid, sandy flats and semistabilized red dunes of southern Africa. They are sexually dimorphic. The tiny males, which are seldom seen, imitate sugar ants or velvet ants in their appearance and habits, while the females hide in and hunt from their characteristic burrows. They are thermophilous, with males as well as females being most active on hot days.

== Range and density ==
They occur in Namibia, Botswana and South Africa. In South Africa they are present in northern Limpopo, and the Northern Cape as far south as the Tankwa Karoo. Their distribution is patchy, but when forming conspecific aggregations, their webs may even touch one another. Such clusters may contain thousands of females, with a density of 50 m^{−2}, or locally, 100 to 200 m^{−2}.

Fossilized sheet webs which closely resemble the modern ones were found in Miocene eolianites of the southern Namib desert, and were dated to some 16 million years ago.

== Female's burrow and web ==
Like the burrowing Hermacha and Asemesthes genera, and dune-living huntsman spiders, they have long spinnerets with very long spigots, which the females use to bind the burrow walls with a succession of silk-rings. A Seothyra female expends 6% of her body mass on the first night of burrow construction, and considerably more before her web is functional. The burrow is straight or curved and as much as 15 cm (6 in) deep. When the burrow is dug, the sand particles are apparently bound in parcels of silk, to facilitate carrying, before these bundles are spun unto the surface webbing.

On the surface, two or four sticky-edged, silk web sheets, consisting of cribellate silk mixed with sand, form thick mats (or flaps) with slits around their peripheries. The mats cover shallow and symmetrically placed depressions, that are linked to the simple and vertical, silk-lined burrow.

Repeated opening of the silky flaps create an impression in the sand which can be likened to a cleft hoof imprint or, in some species, the shape of a four-leaf clover. Sticky silk threads along the margins of the silk mats entangle small arthropods that venture too close. The surface web structures are susceptible to damage by strong winds or heavy rainfall, and the loss of a web may prove fatal to the female.

== Female behaviour ==
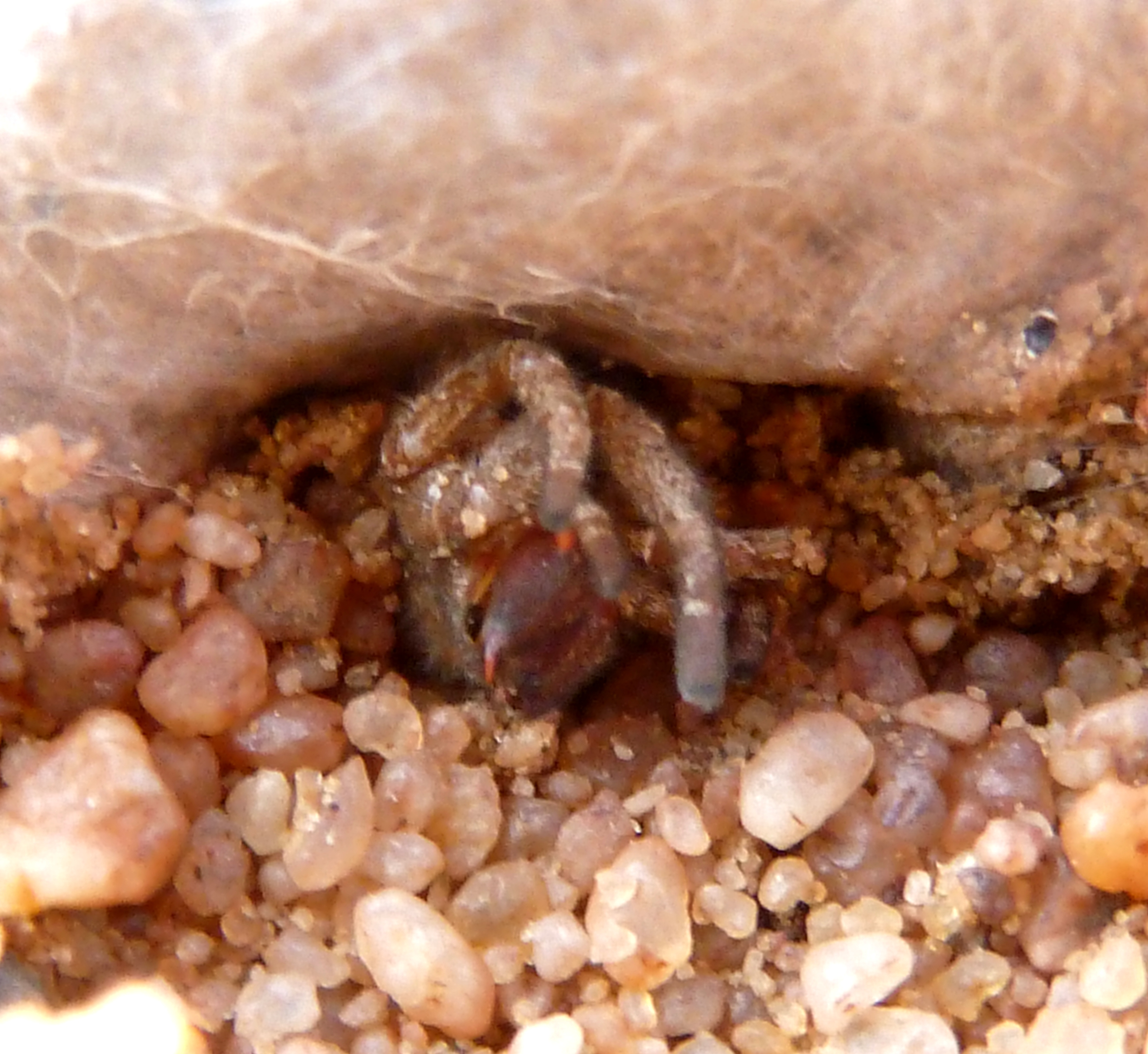
Shed skin (or exuvia) of a Seothyra female under her densely-woven silk canopy

The female spends her whole life in the burrow, but may relocate it when damaged or in response to extreme climatic conditions. In response to periods of extreme climate, such as high winds along with low precipitation, the distribution of the burrows may become clustered as a defense against population collapse.

The female is a sit-and-wait predator that senses surface vibration using a single thread in the burrow. She takes an upside down position under the burrow cover, and will first venture to the underside of the sheet web before she strikes and eventually disentangle her prey. Prey are usually ants, and their remnants are left at the bottom of the burrow. In the Namib dune fields the prey is acquired during the heat of the day. Initially these will be the small Tetramorium ants, but as she grows, she will progress to larger Camponotus ants.

In the Namib dune fields the burrow provides a non-desiccating environment and an essential cool refuge at about 35 °C, with only minor temperature changes. To the contrary the underside of the sheet web may reach a temperature of 60 to 70 °C, with daily fluctuations of more than 40 °C. As the female can endure a critical thermal maximum of 49 °C, she shuttles up and down the burrow to retrieve prey, and spends limited time under the sheet web. The silk web may absorb morning fog, a conjectured source of water for females and spiderlings.

== Breeding and young ==
In the Namib mating occurs in April and May, during the austral winter, and the eggs hatch at the beginning of summer. Seothyra species are semelparous, meaning that they have a single reproductive episode before death, and they practice extended brood care. The young will eat their mother's corpse (a behaviour called matriphagy) and the sheet web before they vacate the parent nest, but typically disperse less than a metre away.

== Longevity and mortality ==
Their life-span is one, or at most two years. A daily food intake which equals 1% of their body mass is sufficient to sustain their slow metabolism. Nonetheless they often starve. In denser aggregations, for instance, they experience shadow competition for ants. In addition to famine or age related deaths, they also fall prey to other arthropods. Females are preyed on by araneophagous Palpimanus spiders, which likely lure them closer by producing surface Rayleigh waves with their specialized front legs. At night, Leucorchestris spiders are kleptoparasites, and possibly predators of Seothyra females.

== Anatomy and relationships ==
They have small median eyes, nearly equal in size. They also have long, extensible anterior lateral spinnerets (the ALS can be retracted) contrasting with reduced posterior lateral spinnerets (PLS). The latter features distinguish them from all except genus Dorceus, of a related but distinct eresid clade.

Males are distinguished from Dorceus by the enlarged first leg, which in Dorceus is nearly equal to the second. The palp's conductor is also highly variable and elaborate in Seothyra, and usually longer than the tegulum. In Dorceus it is a simple spiral or L-shaped hook shorter than the tegulum. Females have the median lobe of the epigynum clearly longer than wide with a central constriction (as opposed to that of Dorceus which is wider than long with more or less straight, converging lateral margins), and lack ampullate (i.e. flask-shaped) gland spigots on the anterior lateral spinnerets (ALS).

Seothyra and Dorceus are both sand-dwelling genera with telescoping anterior lateral spinnerets (ALS). Seothyra and its sister genera Dresserus and Gandanameno form a southern and eastern African clade of the velvet spiders. Dresserus and Gandanameno have modified posterior median spinnerets (PMS).

== Species ==
As of October 2025, thirteen species are known, which Dippenaar-Schoeman (1991) divided into 3 species groups.

I. S. fasciata group:

- Seothyra barnardi Dippenaar-Schoeman, 1991 – Botswana
- Seothyra dorstlandica Dippenaar-Schoeman, 1991 – Namibia
- Seothyra fasciata Purcell, 1904 – Namibia, Botswana, South Africa
- Seothyra griffinae Dippenaar-Schoeman, 1991 – Namibia
- Seothyra neseri Dippenaar-Schoeman, 1991 – Namibia
- Seothyra perelegans Simon, 1906 – South Africa
- Seothyra roshensis Dippenaar-Schoeman, 1991 – Rosh Pinah, southern Namibia

II. S. schreineri group:

- Seothyra annettae Dippenaar-Schoeman, 1991 – Namibia
- Seothyra longipedata Dippenaar-Schoeman, 1991 – Namibia, South Africa
- Seothyra schreineri Purcell, 1903 – sandy flats, Namibia to South Africa
- Seothyra semicoccinea Simon, 1906 – South Africa

III. S. henscheli group:

- Seothyra henscheli Dippenaar-Schoeman, 1991 – Namib dunes, western Namibia
- Seothyra louwi Dippenaar-Schoeman, 1991 – Namibia
