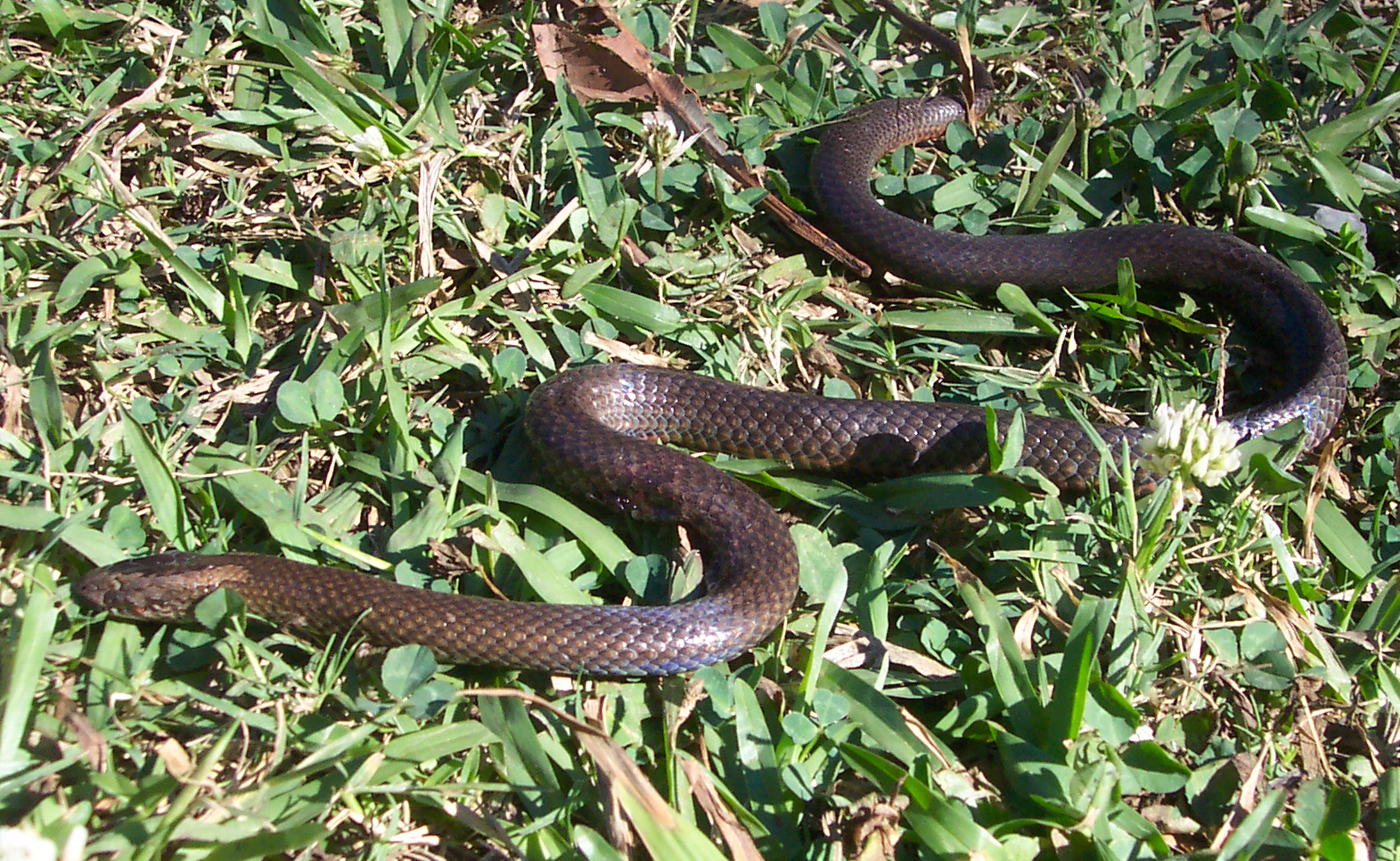
- Cacophis squamulosus, golden-crowned snake

Scientific classification
- Kingdom: Animalia
- Phylum: Chordata
- Class: Reptilia
- Order: Squamata
- Suborder: Serpentes
- Family: Elapidae
- Subfamily: Hydrophiinae
- Genus: Cacophis; Günther, 1863

Species
- Four, see text.

= Cacophis =

Genus of snakes

Cacophis is a genus of venomous snakes, commonly known as crowned snakes, in the family Elapidae. The genus is endemic to Australia.

== Description ==
All species of Cacophis have a distinct "crown" pattern on the head, which gives them their common names. They are venomous, but not dangerous to people.

== Species ==
The following four species are recognized as being valid.

- Cacophis churchilli Wells & Wellington, 1985 – northern dwarf crowned snake – northeastern Queensland
- Cacophis harriettae Krefft, 1869 – white-crowned snake – eastern Queensland, northeastern New South Wales
- Cacophis krefftii Günther, 1863 – dwarf crowned snake – southeastern Queensland, eastern New South Wales
- Cacophis squamulosus (A.M.C. Duméril, Bibron & A.H.A. Duméril, 1854) – golden-crowned snake – eastern Queensland, eastern New South Wales, Australian Capital Territory

Nota bene: In the above list, a binomial authority in parentheses indicate that the species was originally described in a genus other than Cacophis.

== Distribution and habitat ==
Species of Cacophis are distributed along eastern Australia. They inhabit a variety of forest types, from woodland to rainforest.

== Behaviour ==
Cacophis species are generally nocturnal and feed on lizards and reptile eggs.
