= Deadly (franchise) =

British TV documentary franchise

BBC graphic for the series

Deadly... is a strand of British wildlife documentary programming aimed principally at children and young people, which is broadcast on CBBC on BBC One and Two and on the CBBC Channel. It is presented by Steve Backshall, with Naomi Wilkinson as co-host on Live 'n Deadly, and Barney Harwood as co-host on Natural Born Hunters. The strand began with a single series called Deadly 60, and has subsequently expanded into a number of spin-offs, re-edits and follow-up versions.

== Deadly 60 ==
Each series shows Backshall and his camera crew travelling the world in an attempt to find another 60 of the "most deadly" animals in the world. In each episode, Backshall tracks several animals in its habitat, and giving details of what makes the animal notable, with particular emphasis on its impact on the wider ecosystem and the manner of its predatory behaviour; thus, why it is "deadly".

Deadly 60 is distributed by BBC Worldwide to many other countries, including in the US on NatGeo Wild from August 2011.

== Live 'n Deadly ==
Live 'n Deadly is a spin-off series to Deadly 60, with 10 live shows and 3 non-live specials. This series is a live magazine program hosted by Steve Backshall and Naomi Wilkinson, which features a range of magazine content, features and games relating to animals and wildlife, and also uses its live broadcast to encourage interactivity with the viewing audience. The program was a touring series, with episodes filmed live on location from areas around the UK.

The first series of Live 'n Deadly aired on BBC Two (simulcast with CBBC Channel) on Saturday mornings at 9:00 am in between September and December 2010. In addition to the live Saturday show, a public roadshow event was also held the following day in the general area that the program had visited that week (though never in exactly the same location). These roadshows were run by BBC Learning and featured a number of hands-on wildlife-related activities for children and families, and footage from the roadshow events was broadcast the following Saturday as part of the following live programme.

Series 2 of Live 'n' Deadly aired between September and December 2011.

== Deadly 60 Bites ==
This is a series of short filler programmes consisting of individual animals' segments of Deadly 60 cut down into a 5- to 10-minute standalone segment; this is often used as a filler between programmes on the CBBC channel.

== Deadly Art ==
In 2011 a spin-off show was broadcast called Deadly Art, which airs as a short filler programme on weekdays.

=== Series 1 ===
Alligator snapping turtle, piranha, saltwater crocodile, brown bear, wolves, African killer bees, hippos, African fish eagle, king cobra, shark, lynx, mountain gorilla, tuna, rattlesnake, tiger, ghost bat, tarsier, wolverine, red back spider, chameleon, praying mantis, peregrine falcon, donkey, vulture, pangolin, Tasmanian devil

=== Series 2 ===
Goliath birdeater, snow leopard, tokay gecko, aye aye, squid, scorpion, scutigera centipede, lion, wrinkle-lipped bats, barracuda, black eagle, chimpanzee, dolphin, Nile crocodile, pit viper, hornet, lionfish, reticulated python, giant anteater, black tip reef shark, African hunting dog, monitor lizard, gannet, giant octopus, crown of thorns starfish, polar bear

=== Series 3 ===
Series 3 aired May 2012. Banded sand snake, African bush elephant, golden eagle, fossa, tiger shark, harpy eagle, rinkhals, warthog, wolf eel, poison dart frog, spoor spider, giraffe, pink river dolphin, burrowing owl, Arctic fox, millipede, vervet monkey, musk ox, kangaroo, army ant, clouded leopard, kingfisher, hammerhead shark, solifuge, killer whale, black rhinoceros

== Deadly Top 10s ==
The CBBC Channel has started airing Steve Backshall's Deadly Top 10s, which essentially is a 30-minute clip show featuring a collection of material previously seen in Deadly 60.

=== Deadly Top 10s – Series 1 (2009) ===
1 – Fastest: (10) Black mamba, (9) Star-nosed mole, (8) Mantis shrimp, (7) Dragonfly nymph Vs. dragonfly adult (Winner: dragonfly adult), (6) Chameleon, (5) Eyelash pit viper, (4) Tuna, (3) Peregrine falcon, (2) Cheetah, (1) Gannet.

2 – Lethal Weapons: (10) African fish eagle, (9) Hippo Vs. elephant (winner: elephant), (8) Queen snake, (7) Aye-aye, (6) Bullet ant, (5) Sundew Vs. Venus fly trap (winner: Venus fly trap), (4) Great grey owl, (3) Reticulated python, (2) Grizzly bear, (1) Praying mantis

3 – Killer Tactics: (10) Harris hawk, (9) African hunting dog, (8) Leaf-tailed gecko, (7) Death adder Vs. garter snake (winner: garter snake), (6) Chimpanzee, (5) Stoat, (4) Corolla spider Vs. gladiator spider (winner: gladiator spider), (3) Alligator snapping turtle, (2) Leopard, (1) Humpback whale

4 – Toxic: (10) Fat-tailed scorpion, (9) Sydney funnel-web spider, (8) Sea kreat, (7) Skunk, (6) Cone shell, (5) Water monitor Vs. Komodo dragon (winner: Komodo dragon), (4) Paralysis tick, (3) Scutigera centipede Vs. giant centipede (winner: giant centipede), (2) King cobra, (1) Poison dart frog

5 – Fiercest: (10) Tiger, (9) Polar bear, (8) Tiger shark, (7) Honey badger Vs. wolverine (winner: honey badger), (6) Humboldt squid, (5) Japanese giant hornet, (4) Leopard seal, (3) Lion, (2) Saltwater crocodile, (1) Great white shark

=== Deadly Top 10s – Series 2 (2010) ===
1 – Defenders: (10) Goliath bird-eating spider, (9) Adder, (8) Mountain gorilla, (7) Porcupine, (6) Moth butterfly caterpillar, (5) Cassowary, (4) Jack jumping ant, (3) Rhino Vs. buffalo (winner: buffalo), (2) Rinkhals spitting cobra, (1) Bombardier beetle

2 – Super-Senses: (10) Giant anteater, (9) Pink river dolphin, (8) Raccoon Vs. yapok (winner: raccoon), (7) Duck billed platypus, (6) Vampire bat, (5) Sand-swimmer snake, (4) Bat eared fox Vs. brown long-eared bat (winner: bat eared fox), (3) Tarsier, (2) Nile crocodile, (1) Cuttlefish

3 – Extreme: (10) Snow leopard, (9) Thorny devil, (8) Pitcher plant, (7) Lungfish, (6) Fungus gnat glow worm, (5) Arctic fox Vs. fennec fox (winner: Arctic fox), (4) Spoor spider, (3) Emperor penguin, (2) Sperm whale, (1) Wood frog

4 – Mass Attacks: (10) Blacktip shark, (9) Blue footed booby, (8) Coati, (7) Spotted hyena, (6) Desert locust, (5) South American sociable spider Vs. black lace-weaver spider (winner: South American sociable spider), (4) Grey wolf, (3) Japanese honey bee, (2) Bottlenose dolphin, (1) Army ant

5 – Airborne: (10) Pied kingfisher, (9) Robber fly, (8) Draco lizard, (7) Himalayan jumping spider, (6) Magnificent frigatebird (5) Goshawk, (4) Tarantula hawk wasp, (3) Natterer's bat Vs. greater bulldog bat (winner: Natterer's bat), (2) Lammergeier, (1) Kestrel

== Deadly 60 on a Mission ==
In 2011, a compilation series called Deadly 60 on a Mission began airing on Sunday evenings on BBC One; this took the place of Horrible Histories with Stephen Fry in the BBC One schedule, and, like the Horrible Histories spinoff, was designed to utilise content from the associated CBBC programme in a family-aimed mid-evening slot. As with Deadly Top 10s, much of the material in this strand had previously appeared in the main Deadly 60 series.

== Deadly 360 ==
A studio-based format show mixing BBC natural history archive displayed in Minority Report style, presented again by Steve Backshall – The show was broadcast on CBBC between September and December 2011.

== Deadly Nightmares of Nature ==
A series presented by Naomi Wilkinson, in which she travels around the world, looking for smaller potentially dangerous creatures, e.g. scorpions, spiders, poisonous insects, but also crocodiles or venomous snakes. It aired for the first time in 2012.

== Deadly Pole to Pole ==
In the series, which premiered in October, 2013, Steve Backshall travels pole to pole through the Americas while looking for dangerous animals.

== Backshall's Deadly Adventures ==
A series where Steve Backshall goes on deadly adventures.

== Natural Born Hunters ==
A series in which Bob Brisbane narrate various clips (mostly from Deadly 60) about predators and how they hunt. This series could be considered a combination of the Deadly series and the series.

== Deadly 60 Games ==
Several Deadly 60 Flash games have also been produced for CBBC. Deadly Dash (released September 2010) was one of the most popular games on the channel that year. Deadly Planet and Deadly Scramble were subsequently released in September 2012 to coincide with series 2 of Live 'n' Deadly.

== Deadly Dinosaurs ==
In 2018, it was announced that Backshall would be doing a new Deadly series, this time about dinosaurs. The series started in June 2018 and had 10 episodes, broadcast every Wednesday. Each dinosaur is shown as a computer generated figure (mostly using footage from Planet Dinosaur), supposedly the most realistic version yet. Each dinosaur is then given a deadly scale, based on weapons, size and speed. Though the only thing to get 100% deadly was the asteroid that killed the dinosaurs off in the 9th episode dubbed "Deadlier Than the Dinosaurs".

== Deadly Predators ==
In October 2021, it was announced that a new 7 part series called Deadly Predators had begun filming in the UK and would be aired on CBBC in early 2022. This series will combine the face-to-face animal encounters of Deadly 60 with the epic stunts and CGI to showcase the power of predatory animals.
