= Seothyra longipedata =

Northern Cape Buckspoor Spider

Conservation status
- Least Concern (SANBI Red List)

Scientific classification
- Kingdom: Animalia
- Phylum: Arthropoda
- Subphylum: Chelicerata
- Class: Arachnida
- Order: Araneae
- Infraorder: Araneomorphae
- Family: Eresidae
- Genus: Seothyra
- Species: S. longipedata

Binomial name
- Seothyra longipedata Dippenaar-Schoeman, 1991

Species of spider

Seothyra longipedata is a species of spider in the family Eresidae. It is found in Namibia and South Africa, where it is commonly known as the Northern Cape Buckspoor Spider.

== Distribution ==
Seothyra longipedata occurs in two countries: Namibia and South Africa. In South Africa, the species is recorded from two provinces: Northern Cape and Western Cape.

The species occurs in the Richtersveld Transfrontier National Park and the Cederberg Wilderness Area.

== Habitat and ecology ==
The species inhabits multiple biomes including Desert, Fynbos and Savanna biomes at altitudes ranging from 78 to 920 m above sea level.

Seothyra longipedata constructs burrow retreat-webs consisting of a silk-lined burrow. The entrance is covered with a lobed silk flap that serves as a signal web, with the upper part covered in sand to resemble a hoofprint or buck spoor in the sand. Males wander in search of mates.

== Description ==
Seothyra longipedata is known from both sexes.

== Conservation ==
Seothyra longipedata is listed as Least Concern by the South African National Biodiversity Institute due to its wide geographical range. It is protected in the Richtersveld Transfrontier National Park and the Cederberg Wilderness Area.

== Taxonomy ==
The species was originally described by Dippenaar-Schoeman in 1991.
