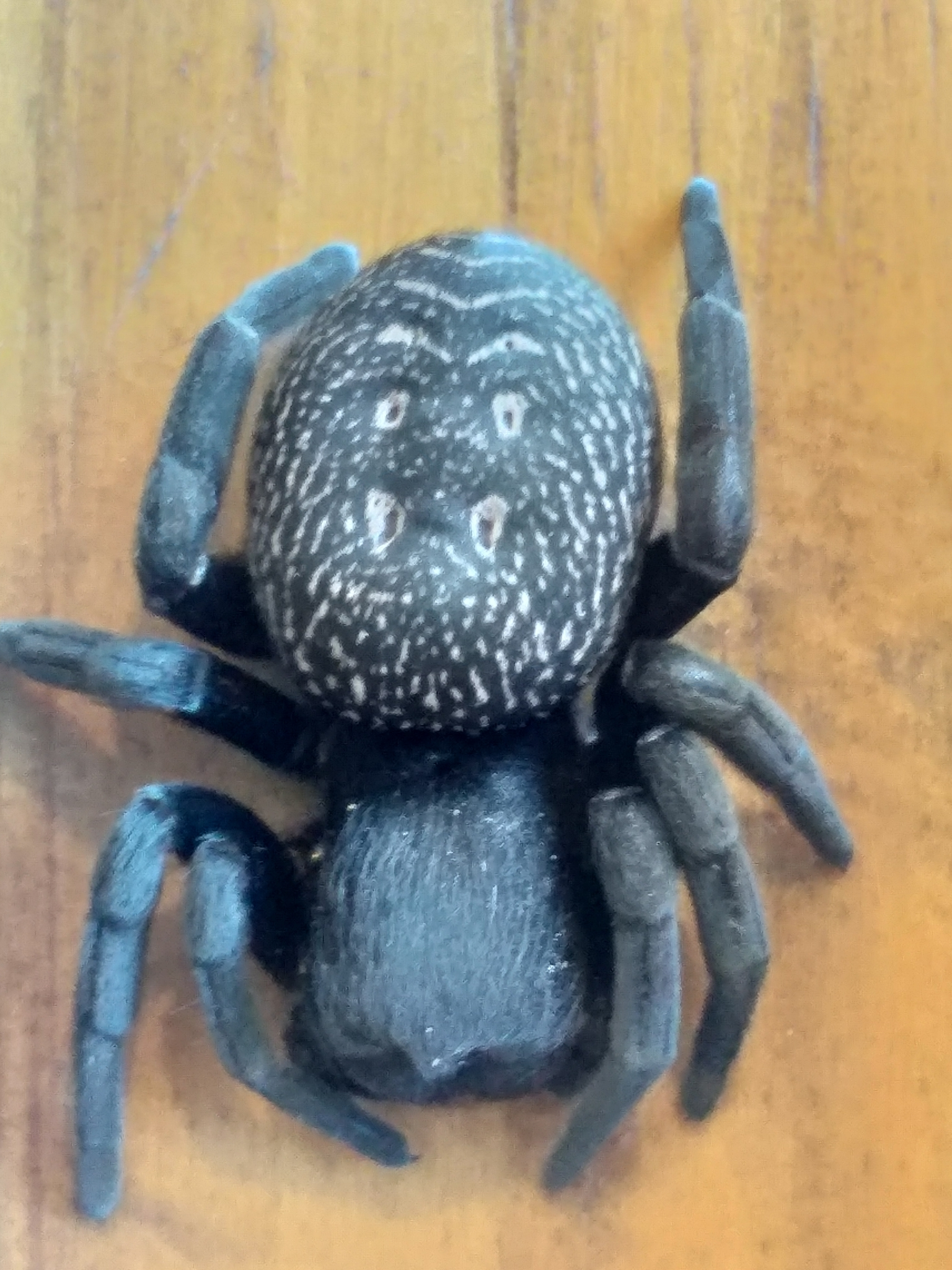

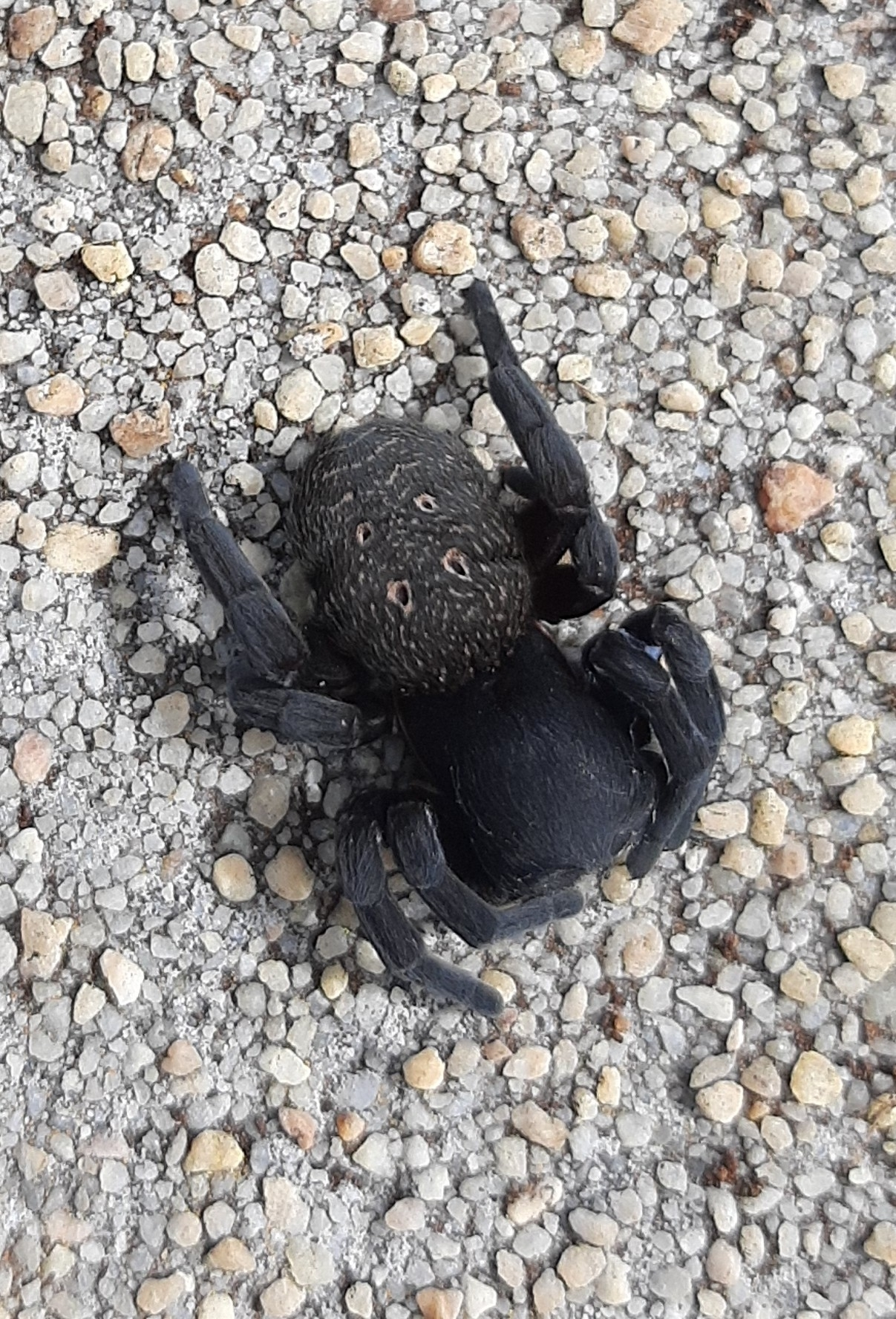

Scientific classification
- Kingdom: Animalia
- Phylum: Arthropoda
- Subphylum: Chelicerata
- Class: Arachnida
- Order: Araneae
- Infraorder: Araneomorphae
- Family: Eresidae
- Genus: Gandanameno
- Species: G. fumosa

Binomial name
- Gandanameno fumosa (C. L. Koch, 1837)

Synonyms
- Eresus bubo L. Koch, 1865

= Gandanameno fumosa =

Spotted Velvet Spider

Species of spider

Gandanameno fumosa is a species of spider in the family Eresidae. It is endemic to southern Africa and is commonly known as the spotted velvet spider.

== Etymology ==
The species epithet "fumosa" is derived from Latin meaning "smoky", referring to the spider's spotty coloration.

== Distribution ==
Gandanameno fumosa is found in South Africa and Namibia.

In South Africa, it occurs across the provinces Eastern Cape, Free State, Limpopo, Northern Cape, and Western Cape.

== Habitat and ecology ==
The species inhabits multiple biomes including Fynbos, Savanna, Grassland, Desert, and Succulent Karoo biomes at altitudes ranging from 9 to 1,399 m above sea level.

Gandanameno fumosa usually lives on bark and builds a funnel-like retreat with the entrance sheltered under a flat, tarpaulin-like signal-web. The species constructs these retreats on trees, providing protection while maintaining access to prey.

== Description ==
Gandanameno fumosa is known from both sexes. The opisthosoma displays white spots with white rings around the dorsal stigmata. The femora of the anterior legs are thickly covered with minute sharp spinules, which helps distinguish this species from related taxa.

== Conservation ==
Gandanameno fumosa is listed as Least Concern by the South African National Biodiversity Institute due to its wide geographical range across southern Africa. The species is protected in seven protected areas including Table Mountain National Park, Goukamma Nature Reserve, Tswalu Kalahari Reserve, Richtersveld Transfrontier National Park, and Augrabies National Park.

== Taxonomy ==
The species was originally described by Carl Ludwig Koch in 1837 as Eresus fumosus with the type locality given only as "Africa". The species was later transferred to the genus Gandanameno by Pekka Lehtinen in 1967.
