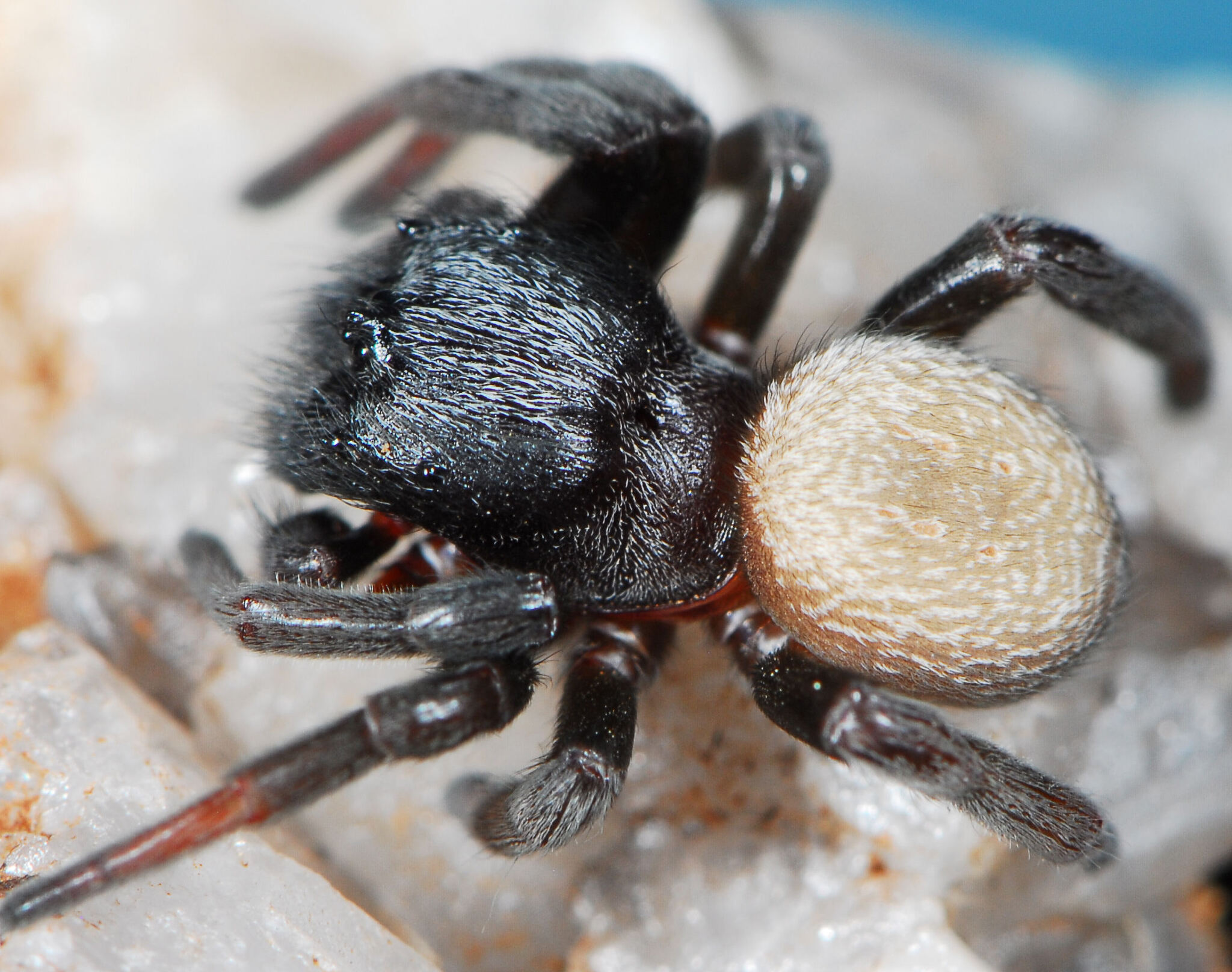
- Male
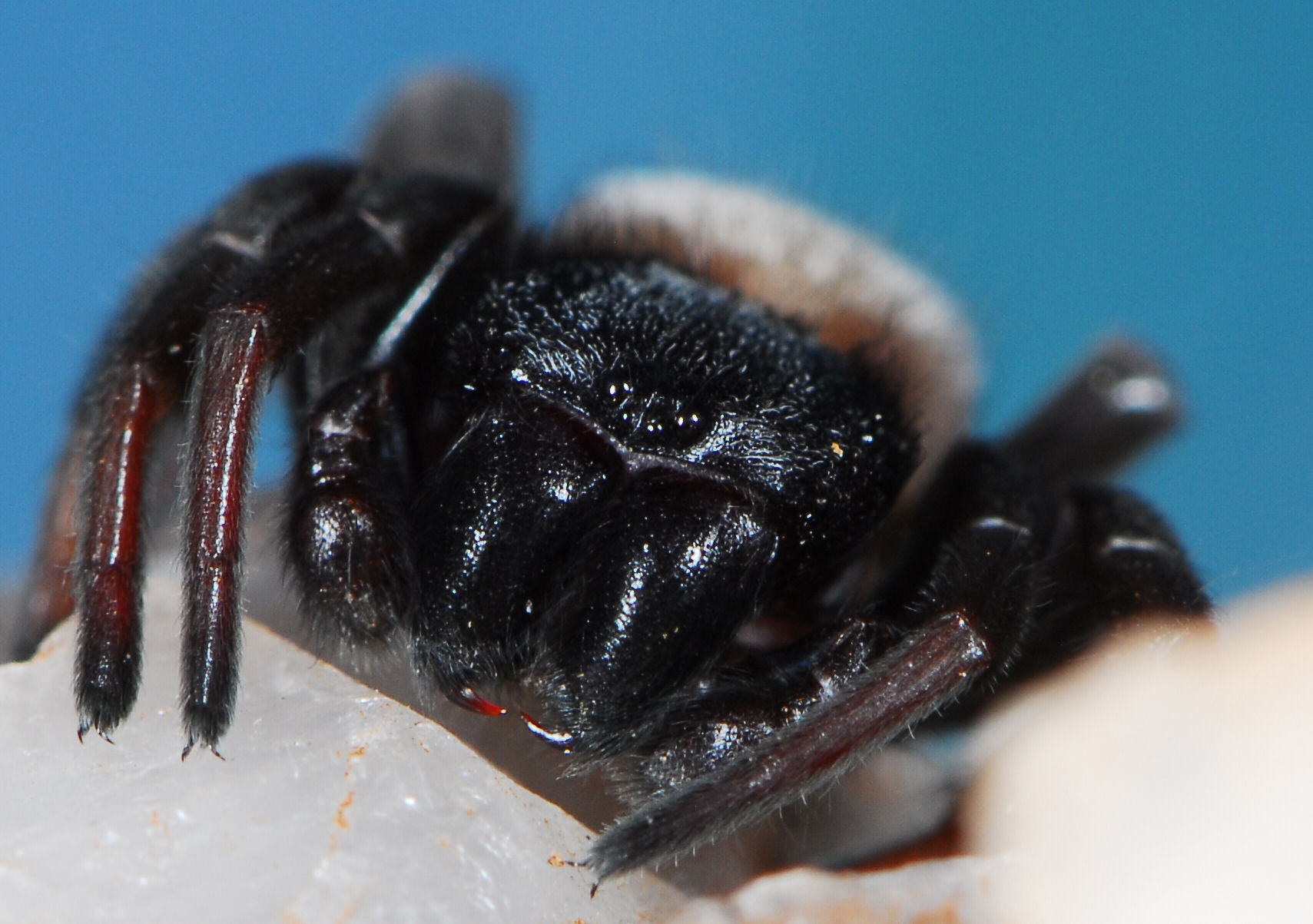
- Male

Scientific classification
- Kingdom: Animalia
- Phylum: Arthropoda
- Subphylum: Chelicerata
- Class: Arachnida
- Order: Araneae
- Infraorder: Araneomorphae
- Family: Eresidae
- Genus: Gandanameno
- Species: G. spenceri

Binomial name
- Gandanameno spenceri (Pocock, 1900)

Synonyms
- Eresus namaquensis Purcell, 1908; Eresus depressus Tucker, 1920

= Gandanameno spenceri =

Spencer's Velvet Spider

Species of spider

Gandanameno spenceri is a species of spider in the family Eresidae. It occurs in southern Africa and is commonly known as Spencer's velvet spider.

== Distribution ==
Gandanameno spenceri is found in Zimbabwe and South Africa. In South Africa, it occurs in the provinces Eastern Cape, KwaZulu-Natal, North West, Northern Cape, and Western Cape.

== Habitat and ecology ==
The species inhabits Fynbos, Grassland, and Savanna biomes at altitudes ranging from 7 to 1,711 m above sea level.

The species is commonly found under stones and ground debris, as well as under bark.

== Description ==
Gandanameno spenceri displays an olive yellow dull opisthosoma lightly mottled with paler spots. The spots on the dorsal surface form short lines on the lateral surface, and the dorsal stigmata are white-ringed. This species is smaller than G. fumosa.

The species is known from both sexes.

== Conservation ==
Gandanameno spenceri is listed as Least Concern by the South African National Biodiversity Institute due to its wide geographical range. The species is protected in several protected areas including De Hoop Nature Reserve, Swartberg Nature Reserve, and Mountain Zebra National Park.

== Taxonomy ==
The species was originally described by Reginald Innes Pocock in 1900 as Eresus spenceri from Port Elizabeth. Pekka Lehtinen transferred it to Gandanameno in 1967 and synonymized Eresus depressus and E. namaquensis with this species.
