= Seothyra semicoccinea =

Scientific classification
- Kingdom: Animalia
- Phylum: Arthropoda
- Subphylum: Chelicerata
- Class: Arachnida
- Order: Araneae
- Infraorder: Araneomorphae
- Family: Eresidae
- Genus: Seothyra
- Species: S. semicoccinea

Binomial name
- Seothyra semicoccinea Simon, 1906

Species of spider

Seothyra semicoccinea is a species of spider in the family Eresidae. It is endemic to the Eastern Cape province of South Africa.

== Distribution ==
Seothyra semicoccinea is endemic to South Africa, known only from the type locality of Willowmore in the Eastern Cape.

== Habitat and ecology ==
The species is a ground-dweller that has been sampled from the Nama Karoo biome at an altitude of 815 m above sea level.

The species constructs retreat-webs. Males wander in search of mates.

== Description ==
Seothyra semicoccinea is known only from the male.

== Conservation ==
Seothyra semicoccinea is listed as Data Deficient for taxonomic reasons. The species has a very restricted distribution. More sampling is needed to collect the female and to determine the species' range.

== Taxonomy ==
The species was originally described by Eugène Simon in 1906. It was revised by Dippenaar-Schoeman in 1991.
