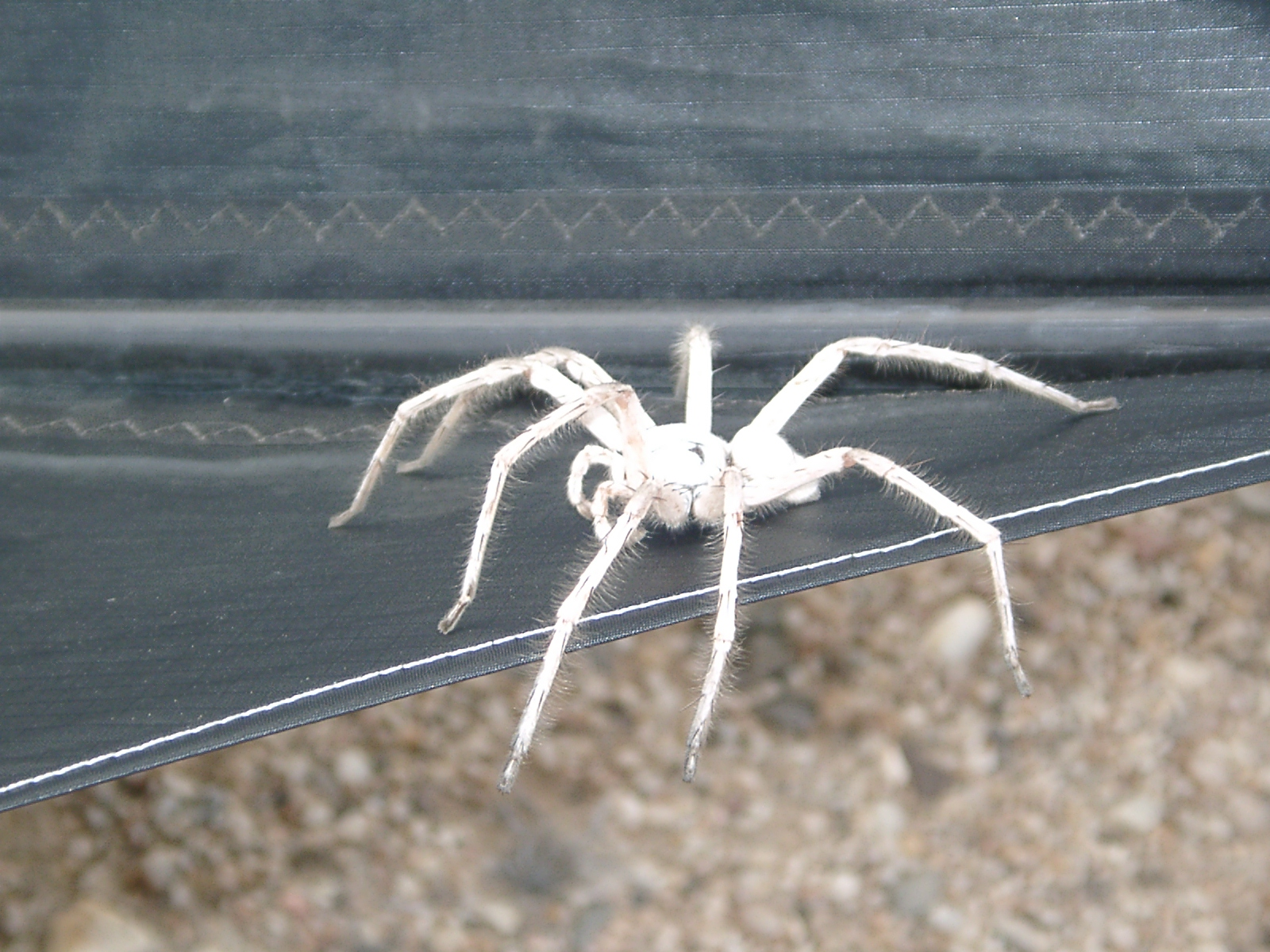
- Leucorchestris arenicola in Namibia

Scientific classification
- Kingdom: Animalia
- Phylum: Arthropoda
- Subphylum: Chelicerata
- Class: Arachnida
- Order: Araneae
- Infraorder: Araneomorphae
- Family: Sparassidae
- Genus: Leucorchestris; Lawrence, 1962

Type species
- L. arenicola Lawrence, 1962

Species
- 7, see text

= Leucorchestris =

Genus of spiders

Leucorchestris is a genus of African huntsman spiders that was first described in 1962 by R. F. Lawrence, who described all of the species in the genus between 1962 and 1966.

Leucorchestris species, also known as a "dancing white lady spiders", are white, wandering spiders that are strictly nocturnal and live in burrows that have been dug into the desert sand. They spend their days burrowed in the sand and only come out to the surface at night. When it is time to come out, Leucorchestris only come out for hunting, mating, and chasing other male spiders. Males are known well for the long distances that they travel when searching for females to mate with. When the male spiders leave their burrows to go out and search for female spiders for mating, their trips usually go as far out as 40-60 m away from their burrows and they are still able to find their way back to them without retracing the path that they took when leaving. Leucorchestris species communicate through vibrations called drumming. This is what they use to steer away from other male spiders during mating time and to find the female spiders.

== Species ==
As of September 2019 it contains seven species, found in Africa:

- Leucorchestris alexandrina Lawrence, 1966 – Angola
- Leucorchestris arenicola Lawrence, 1962 (type) – Namibia
- Leucorchestris flavimarginata Lawrence, 1966 – Namibia
- Leucorchestris porti Lawrence, 1965 – Namibia
- Leucorchestris sabulosa Lawrence, 1966 – Namibia
- Leucorchestris setifrons Lawrence, 1966 – Angola
- Leucorchestris steyni Lawrence, 1965 – Namibia
