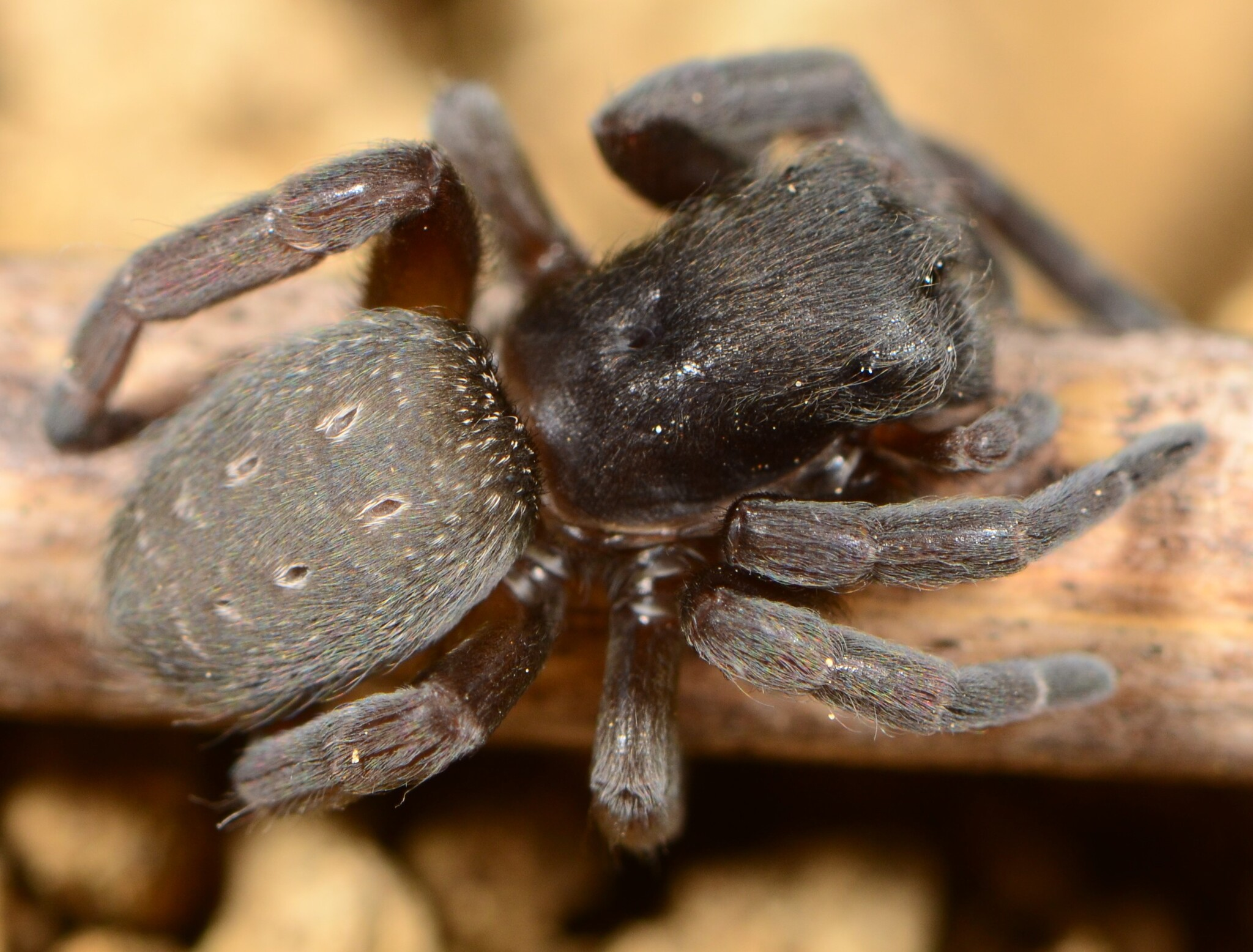
- female G. purcelli
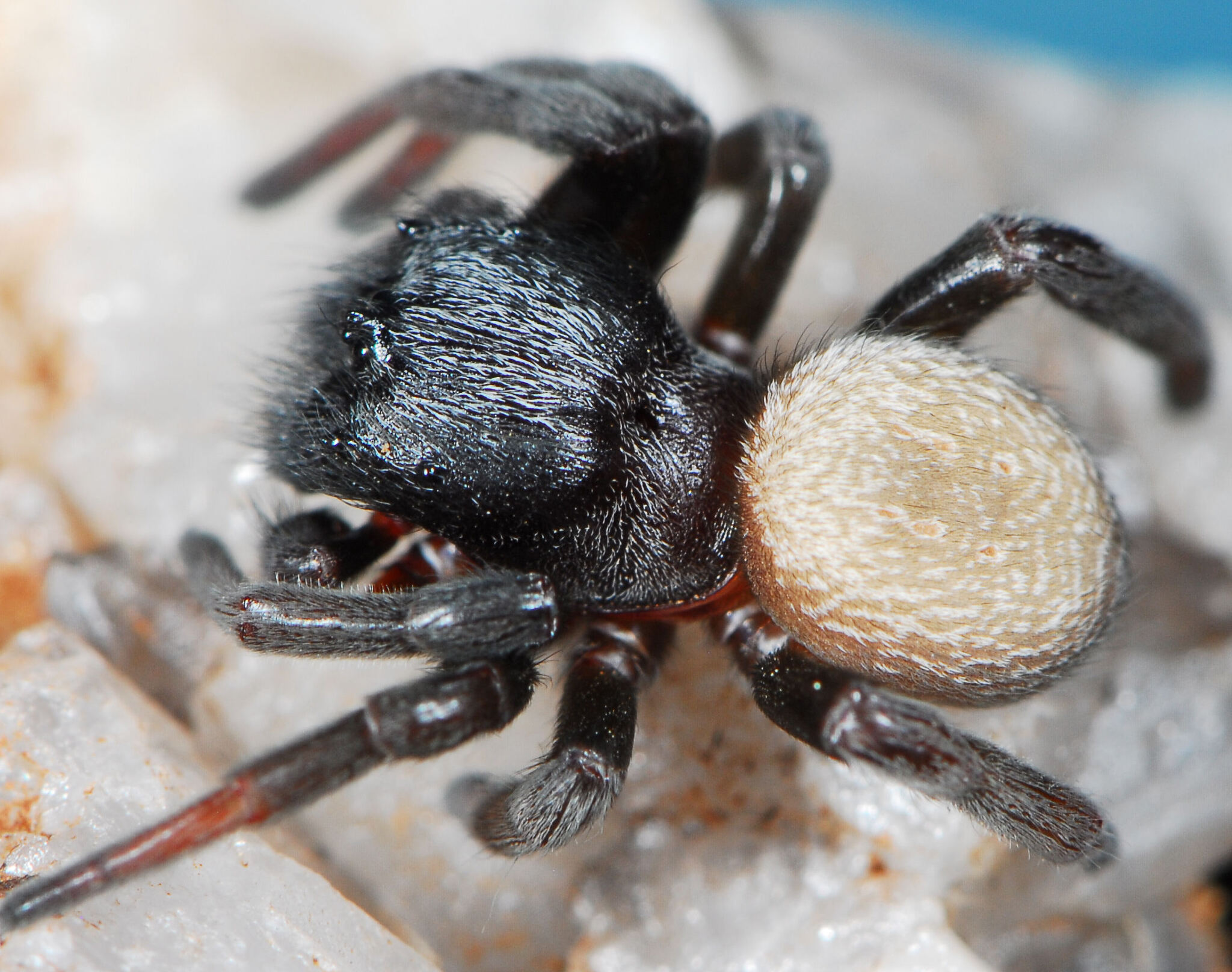
- male G. spenceri

Scientific classification
- Kingdom: Animalia
- Phylum: Arthropoda
- Subphylum: Chelicerata
- Class: Arachnida
- Order: Araneae
- Infraorder: Araneomorphae
- Family: Eresidae
- Genus: Gandanameno; Lehtinen, 1967

Type species
- G. spenceri (Pocock, 1900)

Species
- 5, see text

= Gandanameno =

Genus of spiders

Gandanameno is a genus of African velvet spiders that was first described by Pekka T. Lehtinen in 1967.

== Species ==
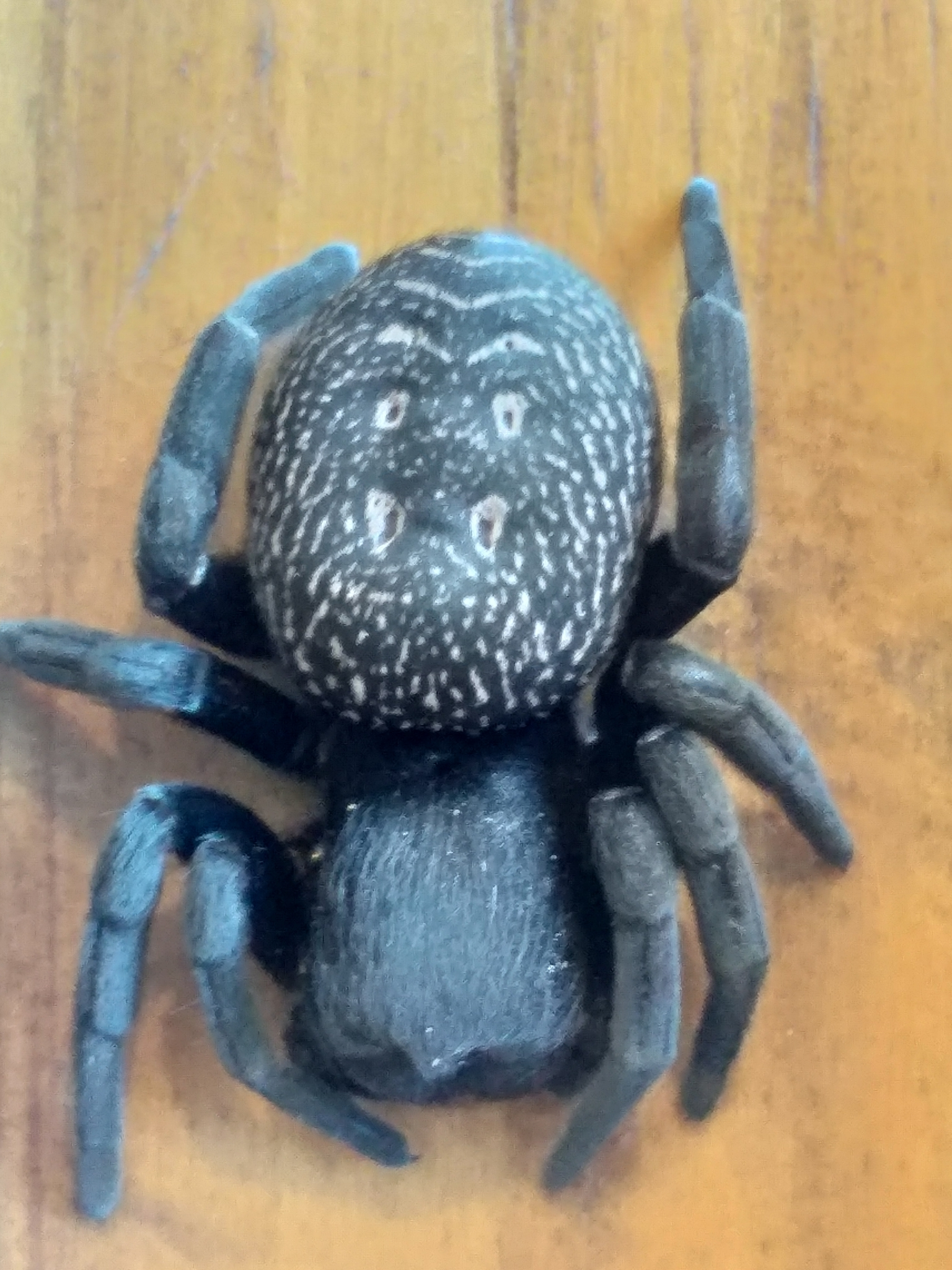
G. fumosa

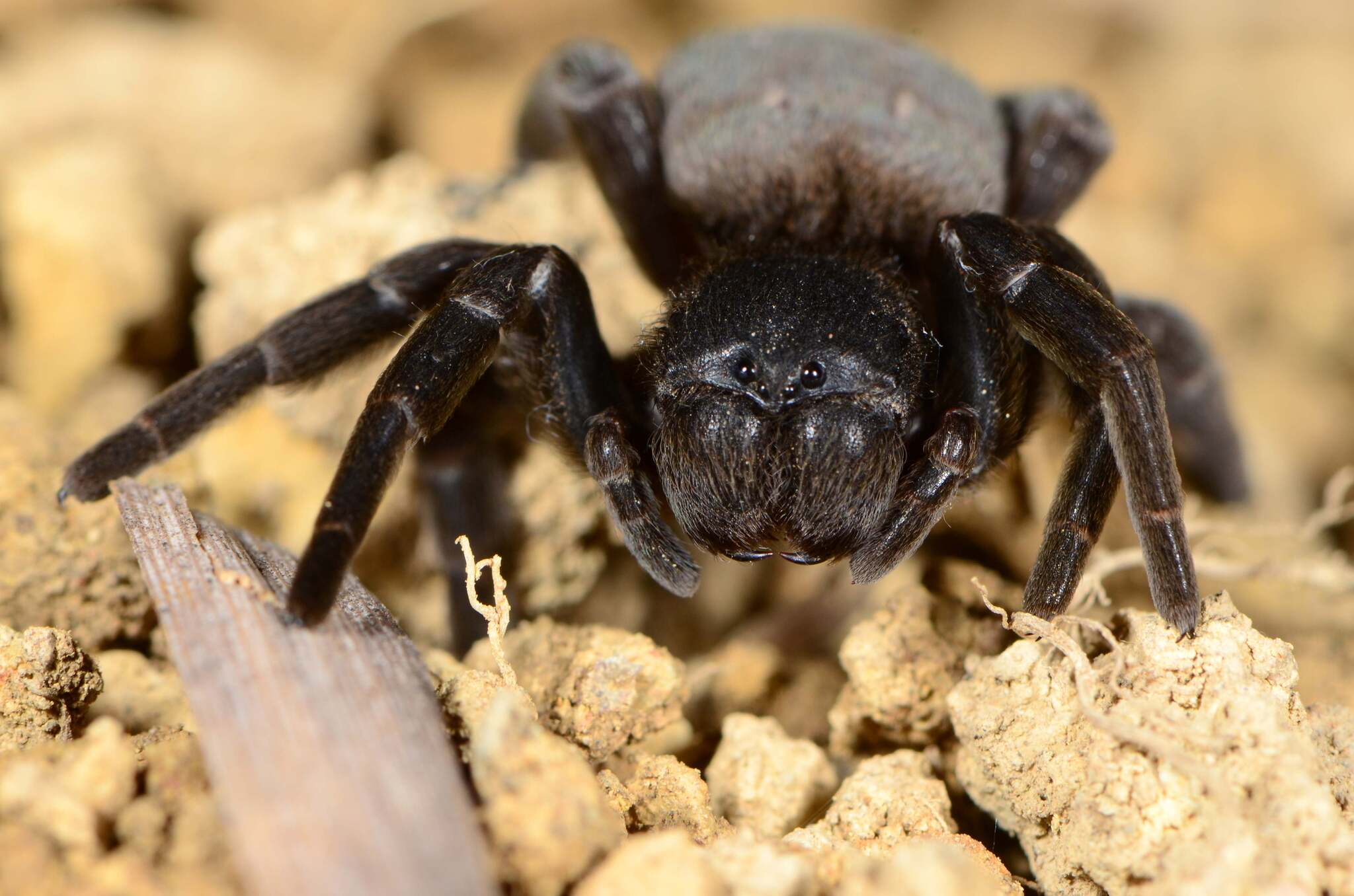
female G. purcelli

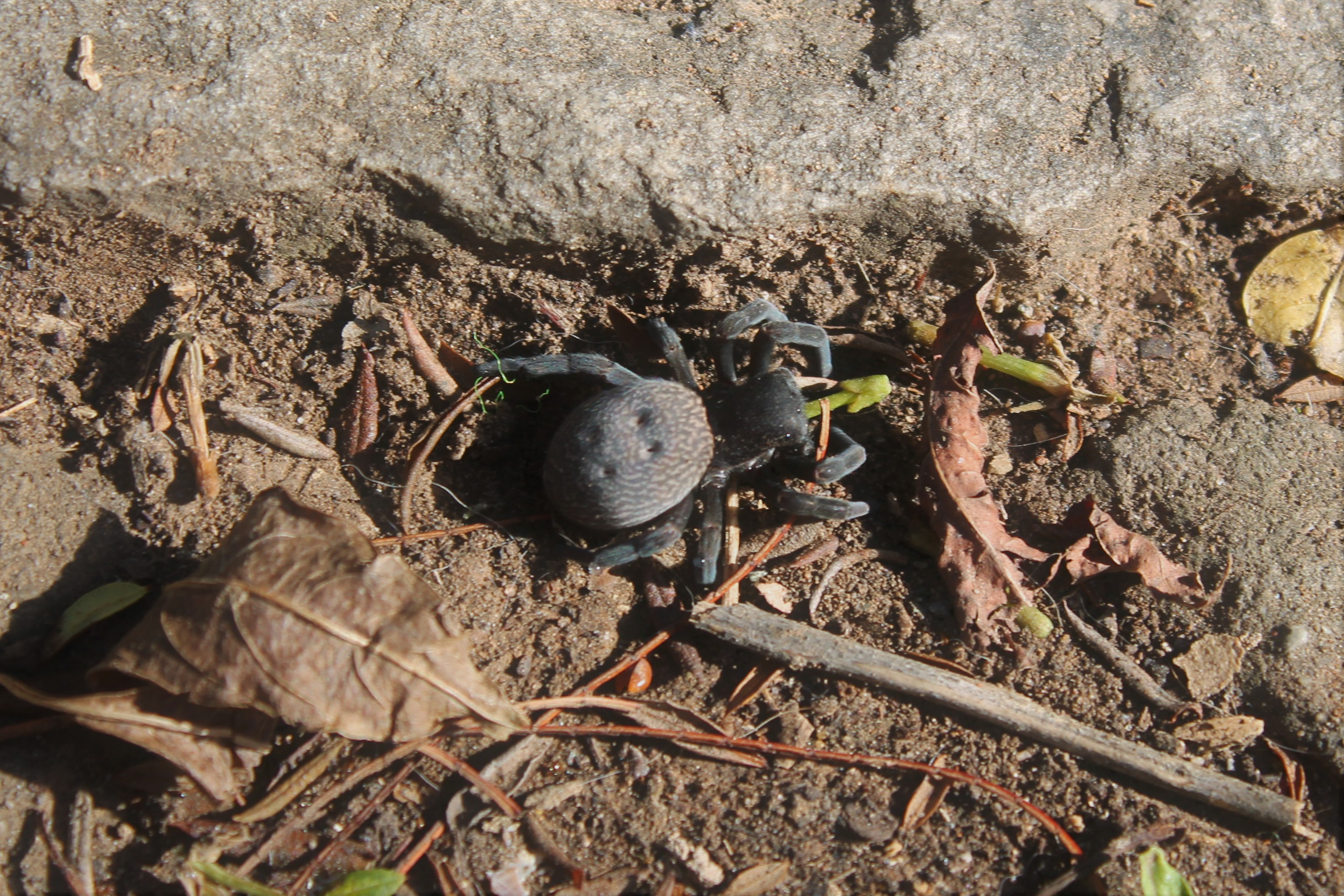
probably G. spenceri

As of September 2025 it contains five species:

- Gandanameno echinata (Purcell, 1908) – Namibia
- Gandanameno fumosa (C. L. Koch, 1837) – Namibia, South Africa
- Gandanameno inornata (Pocock, 1898) – Malawi
- Gandanameno purcelli (Tucker, 1920) – South Africa
- Gandanameno spenceri (Pocock, 1900) (type) – Zimbabwe, South Africa
