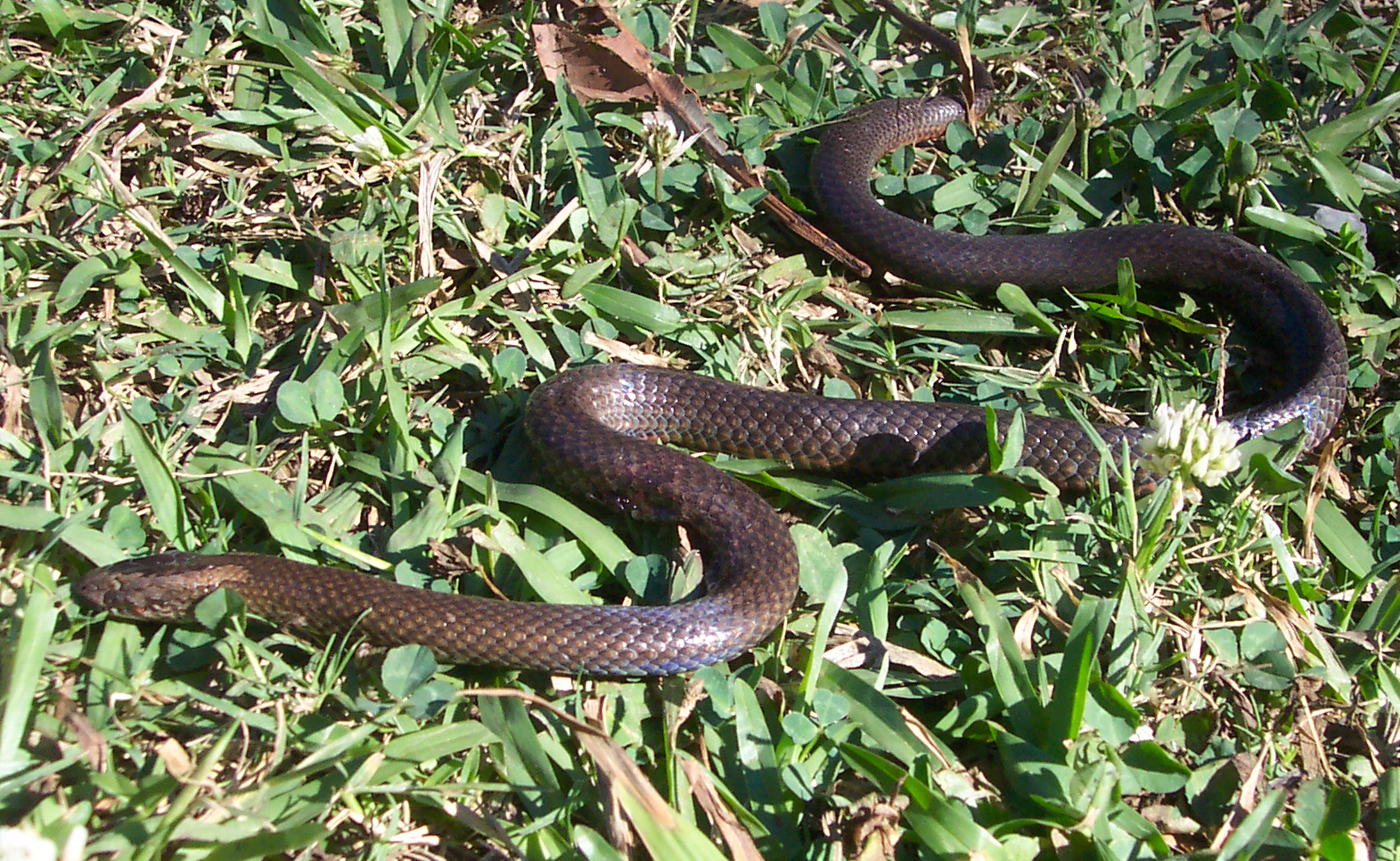

Conservation status
- Least Concern (IUCN 3.1)

Scientific classification
- Kingdom: Animalia
- Phylum: Chordata
- Class: Reptilia
- Order: Squamata
- Suborder: Serpentes
- Family: Elapidae
- Genus: Cacophis
- Species: C. squamulosus

Binomial name
- Cacophis squamulosus (A.M.C. Duméril, Bibron & A.H.A. Duméril, 1854)

Synonyms
- Pseudelaps squamulosus A.M.C. Duméril, Bibron & A.H.A. Duméril, 1854; Diemansia cucullata Günther, 1862; Pseudoelaps atropolios Jan & Sordelli, 1873; Cacophis squamulosus — Cogger, 1983

= Golden-crowned snake =

Species of snake

The golden-crowned snake (Cacophis squamulosus) is a small species of venomous snake in the family Elapidae. The species is endemic to Australia.

== Habitat ==
Like other Cacophis species, the golden-crowned snake is a forest specialist, particularly rainforest. It prefers deeper forested areas, particularly rainforest on mountain slopes, however it can show up in suburbs near waterways and moist environments with ground cover and shelter.

== Venom ==
Cacophis squamulosus is only mildly venomous; however, it will bluff and mock bite if threatened, rearing into an S-shape to display the bright orange ventral pigmentation. Bites from larger individuals may present a health risk; however, it is more likely to attempt to intimidate those it feels threatened by.

== Diet ==
The diet of the golden-crowned snake consists mostly of skinks and other small lizards which they hunt at night; they may also take frogs and tadpoles.

== Geographic range ==
Cacophis squamulosus is localised to eastern Australia, from Canberra, ACT, to Cairns, QLD.

== Description ==
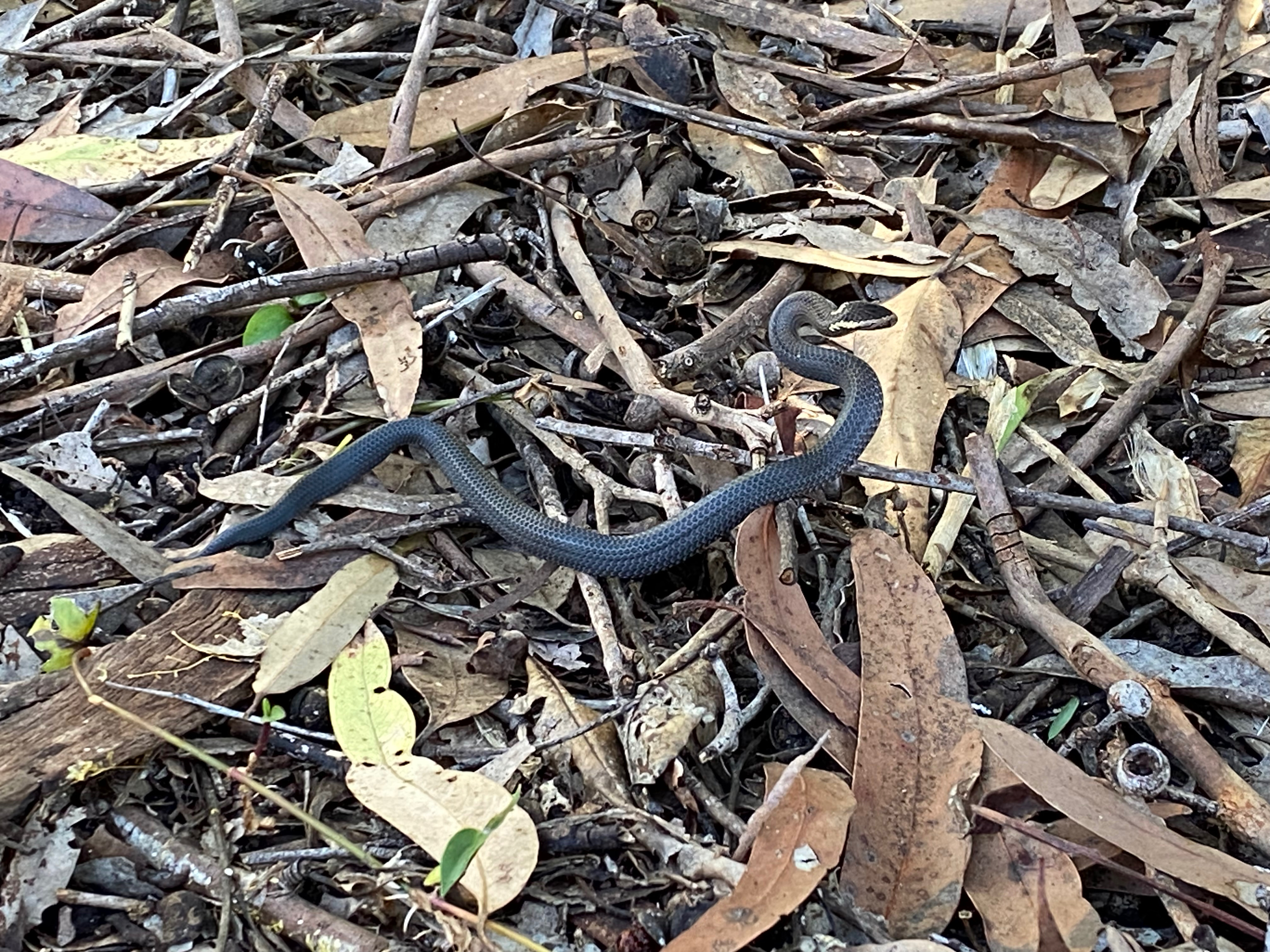
A Golden-crowned snake showing distinctive markings

The average total length (including tail) of C. squamulosus is 50 cm (20 in), but it may reach 98 cm (39 in), making it the largest of the crowned snakes. The golden-crowned snake has a dorsal surface grayish-brown to dark brown in colour, and a ventral surface of orange to pink, with a mid-line of black spots. The "crown" is a pale yellow-brown stripe starting at the snout and sweeping back along both sides of the head, not connecting at the back of the head as in C. krefftii or C. harriettae, instead trailing down the neck. The Dorsal scales are in 15 rows at mid-body.

== Reproduction ==
Cacophis squamulosus is oviparous.
