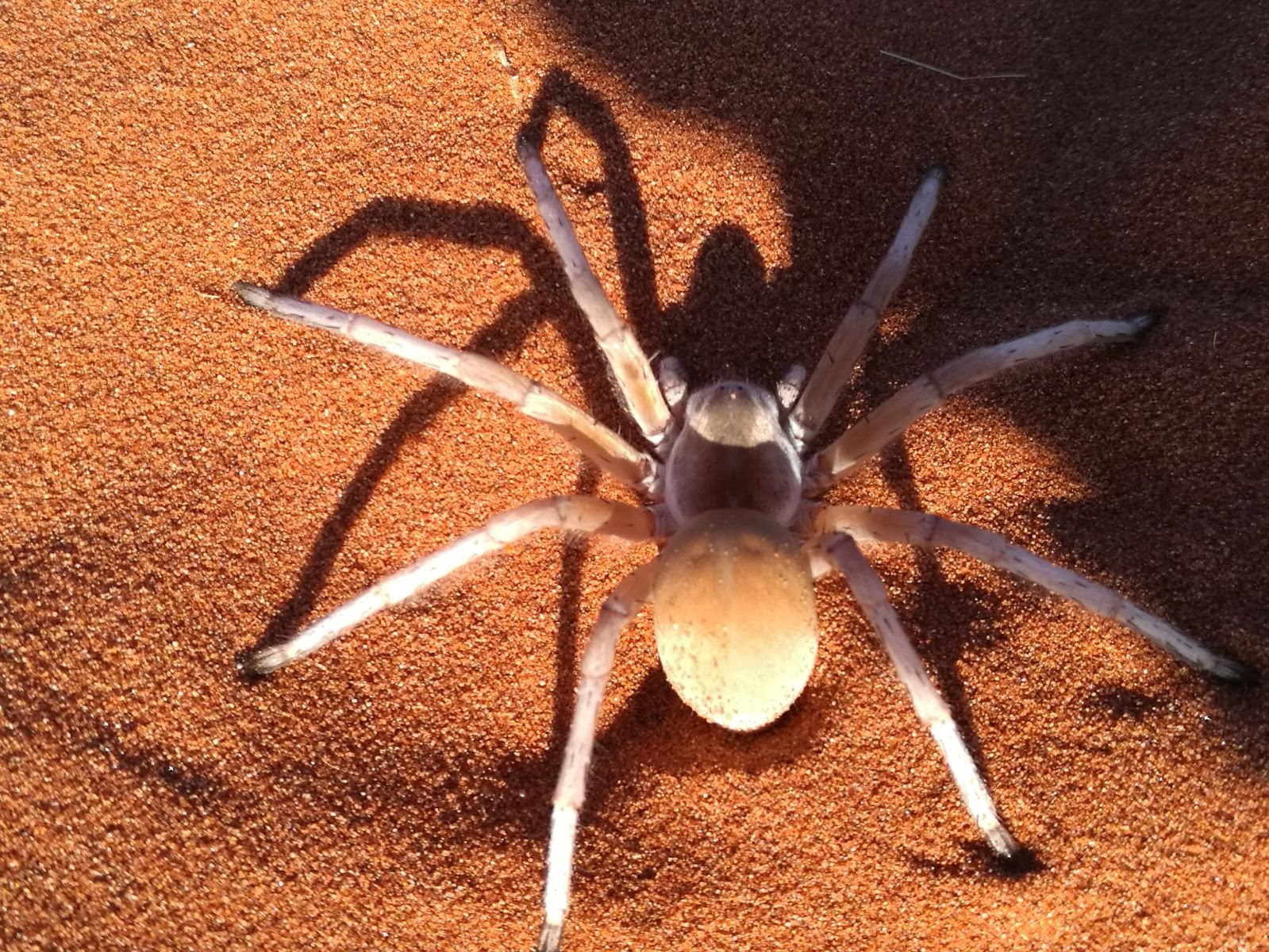
- White lady spider in Namibia

Scientific classification
- Kingdom: Animalia
- Phylum: Arthropoda
- Subphylum: Chelicerata
- Class: Arachnida
- Order: Araneae
- Infraorder: Araneomorphae
- Family: Sparassidae
- Genus: Leucorchestris
- Species: L. arenicola

Binomial name
- Leucorchestris arenicola Lawrence, 1962

Synonyms
- Leucorchestris kochi

= Leucorchestris arenicola =

Species of spider

Leucorchestris arenicola, commonly called the dancing white lady spider, is a huntsman spider in the family Sparassidae and genus Leucorchestris. It is commonly found in the Namib desert of Namibia. It is often mistaken with the similarly named Carparachne aureoflava, more commonly known as the wheel spider, from the same location. L. arenicola relies on seismic vibrations, called drumming, for communication. It taps its foremost legs on the sand to send messages to other white lady spiders. Male L. arenicola will travel over 50 metres in one night searching for a mate. If they find a mate, they must be extremely careful, for drumming the wrong message can be deadly. One of the major features that characterizes its nocturnal behavior is its specialized vision, using eight eyes in different orientations to capture a panoramic view of the surroundings. L. arenicola spiders use temporal summation in order to be able to see dim lighting during night-time wanderings. The species was first described by Reginald Frederick Lawrence in 1962, who described all the species in the genus Leucorchestris.

== Description ==
L. arenicola have a creamy, white shading. Their bodies can be up to 32 mm (1.3 in) long. Males may have leg spans up to 14 cm (5.5 in). Males differ from females in that they are lighter in weight with longer leg spans.

=== Identifying between sexes ===
Leg spination is the most reliable way to differentiate between sexes among L. arenicola. Between 5 and 8 legs of males contain a median tibia dorsal spine. When this feature is found in females, it will only be seen on a maximum of 4 legs. However, females will rarely have this spine. Other characteristics, including eye arrangement, pedipalp structure, tibial claws, and prosoma dimensions, do not predict differences in sex.

== Habitat and distribution ==
L. arenicola are found primarily in desert regions of Namibia, particularly the dunes of the Namib Desert. The spiders reside in burrows with a territory that extend across an approximate 3 meter radius within bare dunes of the region. As exclusively nocturnal creatures, L. arenicola spiders remain hidden in their burrows to protect themselves from the heat of the desert sun.

=== Burrows ===
L. arenicola stay within their burrows throughout the day and then wander beyond their territory radius at night. Burrows are dug into the sand and are lined with silk. The burrows may be up to 40 cm long, 25 cm deep, and at about a 30 degree angle. The specificity of the burrow's dimensions create cooler temperatures in which the spiders preferentially reside. Silk may also be used to hold loose sand in place. The burrow wall is stabilized using long spigots on their long spinnerets to interweave the sand as far as 3 millimeters deep. The burrows are usually occupied for a couple of months. Burrows are sometimes covered by a camouflaged covering.

== Diet ==
L. arenicola are considered polyphagous since they can feed on a large variety of foods that remain constant across seasons. This can vary from insects, to arachnids, and reptiles. L. arenicola prey on over 97 species within these categories. The majority of the prey are also nocturnal organisms and consist of beetles, moths, and weevils. However, this depends on the region and territory occupied by the spider, based on the surrounding fauna.

=== Foraging ===
Foraging usually occurs within a 3 m radius of the burrow, and rarely occurs during night wanderings beyond this radius. L. arenicola forage for food for several nights, followed by a period of rest. Most of the prey captured are two-thirds the size of the spider or smaller, but every few weeks, L. arenicola capture larger prey that can be greater than 3 mm. The foraging strategy used by L. arenicola is a sit-and-wait strategy, whereby they sit idly within their territory and wait until prey arrive. Some L. arenicola, especially the larger males, engage in cannibalism. This is often due to increased competition and food shortages in their territory.

== Reproduction ==
L. arenicola engage in reproductive patterns with consistent incubation periods of 15 days. This seasonality of reproduction is largely due to the male spiders, who spend the winter months molting to adulthood, while female spiders are present year-round. This is evidenced by the reduction in eggs found during winter months. Egg clutches are enclosed in a 5 mm thick cocoon, hidden about 12 cm deep in the burrow. There are about 76 eggs on an average per clutch. Spinning the cocoon takes up a significant amount of the female spider's energy. She loses about 5 mg in weight upon completing it.

== Mating ==
=== Long-distance wandering ===
L. arenicola engage in long-distance wandering late at night in pursuit of mates before returning to their burrows. Male L. arenicola venture anywhere from 16 to 91 m outside of their radius, and walk approximately 42 to 314 m within that radius. During this time, males venture into female territories, mating with up to 50% of the female spiders they come across. L. arenicola is a promiscuous species, engaging in mating behaviors upon encountering a spider of the opposite sex. Female and spiderling L. arenicola also wander in the dark; however, they remain within their 3 m radius.

==== Mortality risk ====
During the long-distance wandering at night, male L. arenicola sometimes disappear. This may be due to predation by gerbils and other desert species. Female L. arenicole live approximately 6 months, while males live 1–2 months. This can be partially attributed to the increased risk of mortality upon nocturnal wandering beyond the 3 m territory radius. Furthermore, during vibrational signaling for mating, males risk getting attacked and killed by female L. arenicola if their signal is not distinguishable enough from prey.

==== Male-male interactions ====
During long-distance wandering, male L. arenicola may encounter up to five other male territories. Males compete for mates during long-distance wanderings and often display aggressive and warning signals to other males. Male L. arenicola may interfere with another male in the process of mating. This applies especially for larger males. Roughly 50% of the mating behavior is dominated by 8% of the males in a region, of which all are larger in size. For males that do not differ greatly in size, they must avoid any confrontation with larger males. These males will signal for other males to keep away via a sand drumming display. Drumming is seen mostly during wandering away from the burrow and has adapted as a method of signaling other adult L. arenicola of its presence, either for mating purposes or to keep away.

==== Female-male interactions ====
Male and female L. arenicola sometimes mate on successive nights. The frequency of mating is related to the male's size, with larger males tending to mate more than smaller males. Mating is limited to a small group of females. Smaller females do not tend to mate as much due to reduced fecundity. When males encounter a female burrow, they use vibrational signaling through the sand to alert the female of its presence. However, the male must ensure that these seismic signals are distinguishable from those of other predators to prevent being attacked and killed by the female spider.

== Physiology ==
=== Vision ===
L. arenicola have eight eyes, with four eyes on the anterior side of the carapace and four on the posterior side. Based on their position, the eyes fall under the name anterior median eyes (AMEs), anterior lateral eyes (ALEs), posterior median eyes (PMEs), or the posterior lateral eyes (PLEs). AMEs are the main eyes, while the others are considered secondary eyes. AMEs are classified as principal eyes because they have a reversed retina with muscles that have control over the direction and magnitude of the receptive field, while ALEs, PMEs, and PLEs have no muscular retinal control and an inverse retina with a reflecting tapetum behind it which aids in night vision.

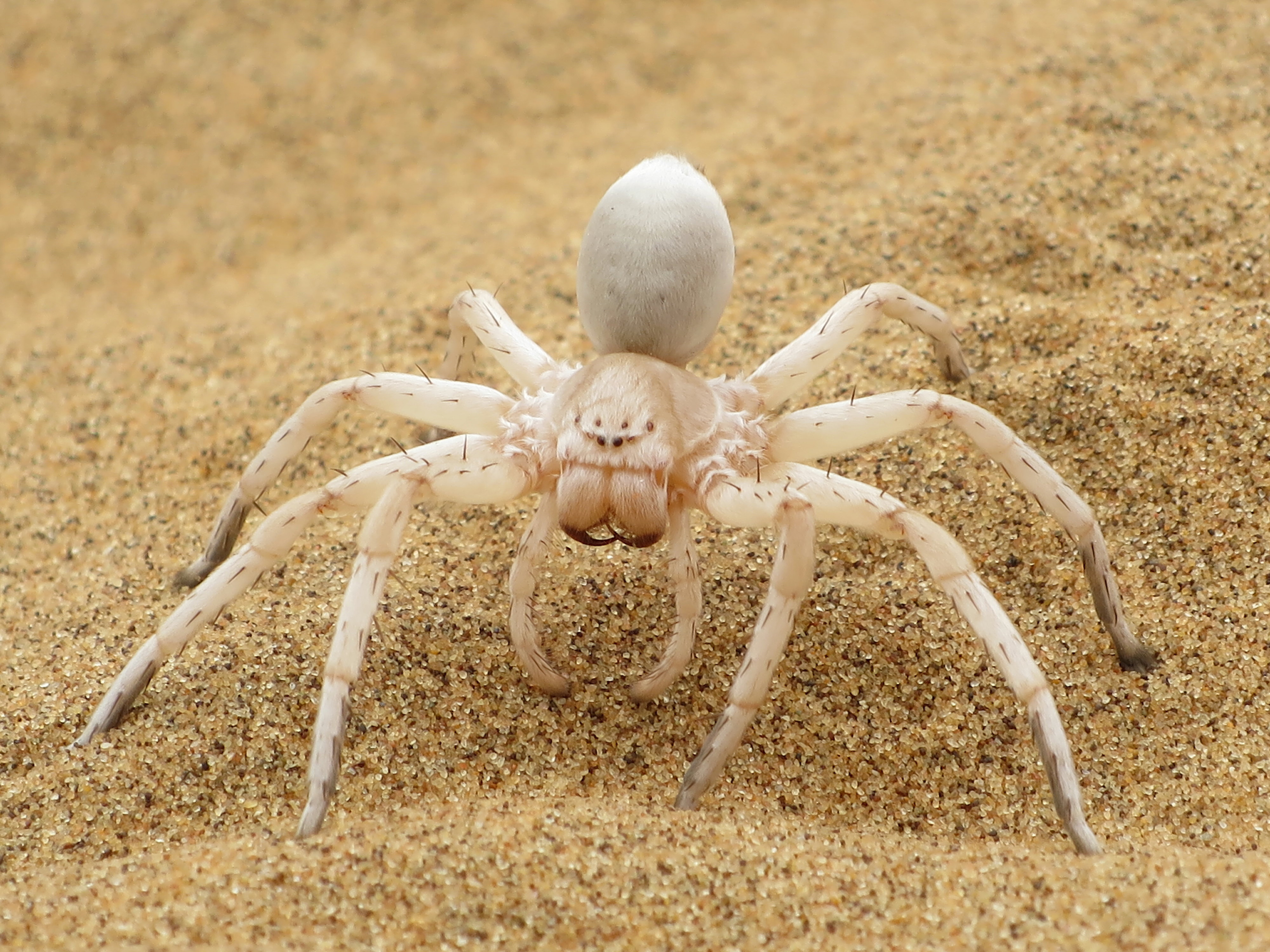
White lady spider: The eight eyes can be clearly seen in this image.

==== Visual fields ====
The visual fields of the lateral eyes (ALEs and PLEs) are elongated along a horizontal plane and overlap. This allows the spiders to have an extensive receptive field across the horizontal plane. AMEs had circular visual fields that appear to be forward looking and also overlapped, while PMEs have overlapping visual fields that integrates upper planes of sight. Together these visual fields produce a full panoramic visualization of the spider's surroundings. AMEs, PLEs, and ALEs are involved in nocturnal navigation, while PMEs are not.

==== Role of vision in nocturnal navigation ====
Although seismic communication via drumming and other vibrational mechanisms assist in navigation in the dark, vision is a major factor in nocturnal navigation. This differs from other spider species, in which vision does not play a significant role in nocturnal visualization. L. arenicola have visual fields that span an entire panoramic visualization of surroundings. The spider’s eight eyes assist in this ability to visualize one’s surroundings. Each eye is enabled to specialize and fine tune its function for specific visual tasks. In the case of L. arenicola, this specialization is in navigation. Eyes are composed of one photopigment that best captures light of about 550 nm. However, they have weak temporal resolution in dark conditions. In order to be able to see at night, L. arenicola use temporal summation for navigation across the dunes. Temporal summation of visual stimuli allows multiple stimuli to be integrated to capture visual information in dim lighting. The disadvantage to this adaptation is that quickly-moving object cannot be seen, since each temporal sum takes about 1 second.
