= Witsand Nature Reserve =

Nature reserve in the Northern Cape, South Africa

Witsand Provincial Nature Reserve
- Witsand-natuurreservaat
- Location within South Africa
- Location: Northern Cape Province, South Africa
- Coordinates: 28°32′56″S 22°29′30″E
- Area: 31.7 km^{2} (12.2 sq mi)
- Designation: Nature reserve
- Designated: 1994
- Governing body: Northern Cape Department of Nature Conservation

Witsand Nature Reserve (Afrikaans: Witsand-natuurreservaat) is located in Northern Cape, South Africa, and covers 3,500 hectares. The reserve is 80 km southwest of Postmasburg and 59 km northeast of Groblershoop. The reserve is dominated by sand dunes on a plateau around 1,200 m above sea level. Singing sand can be found here, a phenomenon in which during the dry summer months, a roar can be heard while walking over the sands.

== Surroundings ==
70 km north of Witsand is Postmasburg, best known as a center of manganese, asbestos, and diamond mining. Gatkoppies Mine, 5 km north of Postmasburg, is a notable archaeological site. Excavations here prove that the Khoisan were mining here as early as the year 700 C.E. They used a red powder from the iron ore to anoint their faces and bodies, known as blinkklip or hematite.

== Climate ==
The reserve lies in an area with wet summers and gets 150 to 300 mm of rain a year. Most of the rain falls from February to March. Summers average 28 °C but 40 °C temperatures are not unheard of. The average temperature in winter is 20 °C.

== Flora ==
Among the trees found in the reserve are shepherd's tree, camel thorn, sweet thorn, and gray camel thorn.

== Sources ==
- Stuart, Chris & Mathilde (2012). National Parks and Nature Reserves. Struik Travel and Heritage. ISBN 978-1-77007-742-3.
