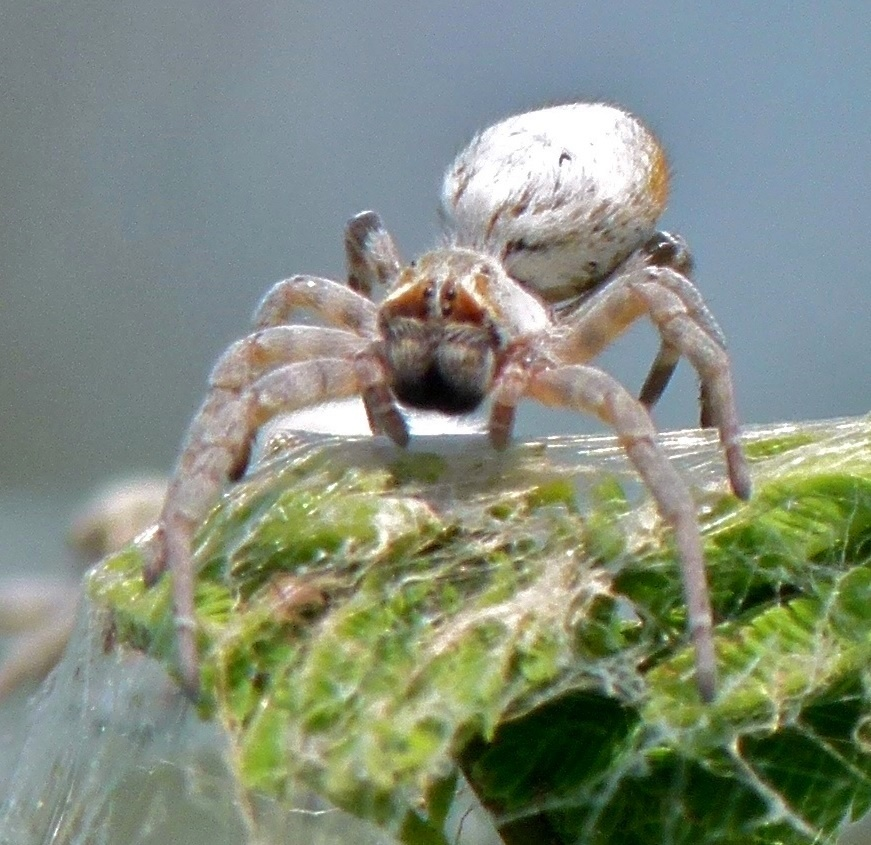
- Female

Scientific classification
- Kingdom: Animalia
- Phylum: Arthropoda
- Subphylum: Chelicerata
- Class: Arachnida
- Order: Araneae
- Infraorder: Araneomorphae
- Family: Eresidae
- Genus: Stegodyphus
- Species: S. dumicola

Binomial name
- Stegodyphus dumicola Pocock, 1898

Synonyms
- Stegodyphus deserticola Purcell, 1908

= Stegodyphus dumicola =

African social spider

Species of spider

Stegodyphus dumicola, commonly known as the African social spider, is a species of spider of the family Eresidae, or the velvet spider family. It is native to Central and southern Africa.

This spider is one of three Stegodyphus spiders that lives a social lifestyle (S. lineatus, S. mimosarum, and S. dumicola). This spider has been studied living in large natal colonies (ranging from tens to hundreds of highly related spiders) in large, unkempt webs. Each colony is composed mainly of females, where a minority (forty percent) act as reproducers, and a majority (sixty percent) remain childless and take care of the young.

Males live a shorter lifespan, during which they will largely remain in the natal nest. Females are known for extreme allomaternal care, since all females – even unmated virgin ones – will take care of the young until they are eventually consumed by the brood.

== Description ==
Stegodyphus spiders have a tough carapace with white hairs along the body. Male Stegodyphus spiders have dark borders and narrow white bands along the abdomen, while females have dark longitudinal bands along the abdomen. Spiders of this genus vary in length, typically between 2.3 and 3.5 mm. Like other “velvet spiders” the anterior region of the prosoma is raised and convex sloping to the posterior. This is more prominent in adult males compared to females and is present once the spider has matured past early instars.

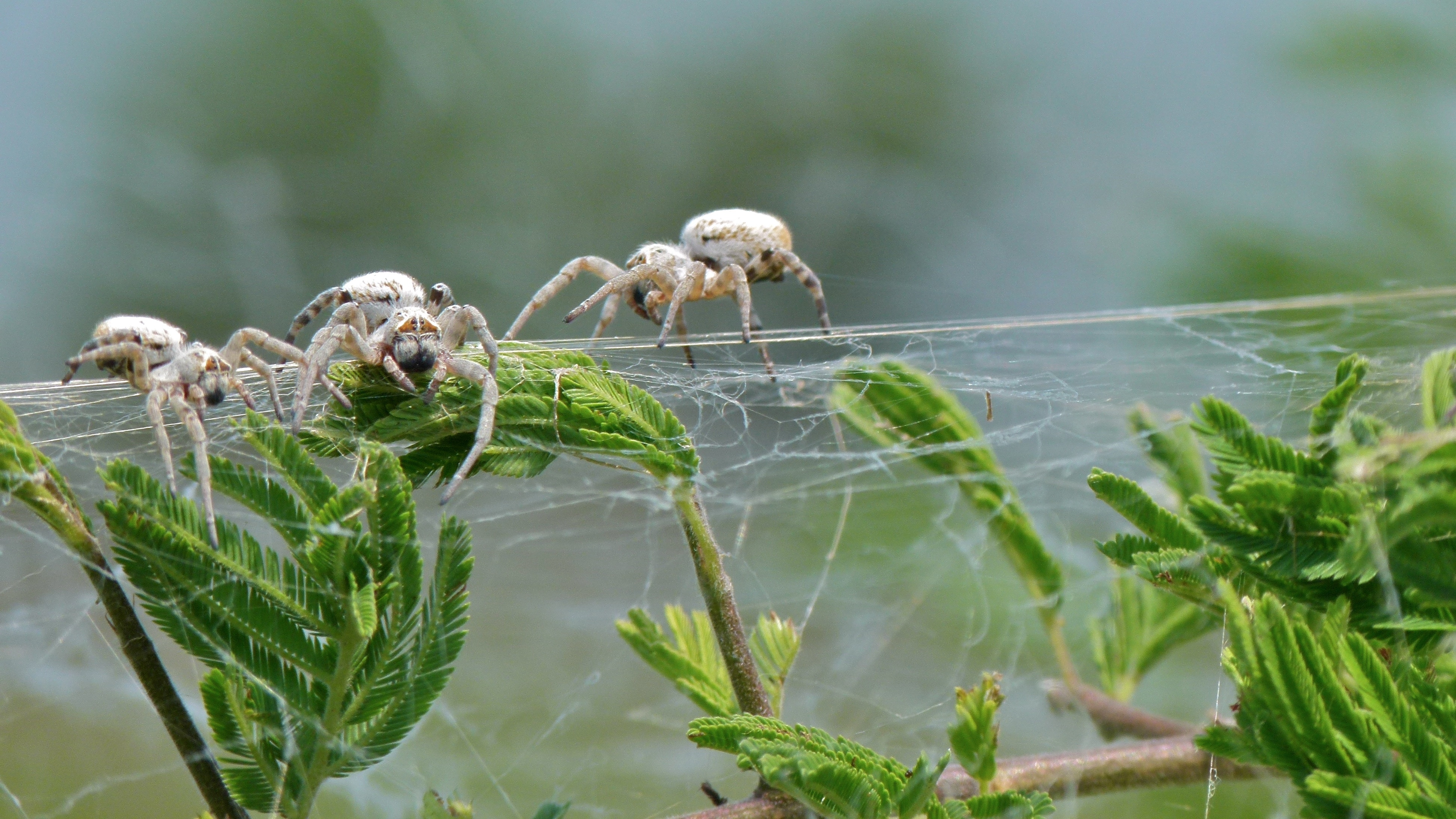
Female spiders on web

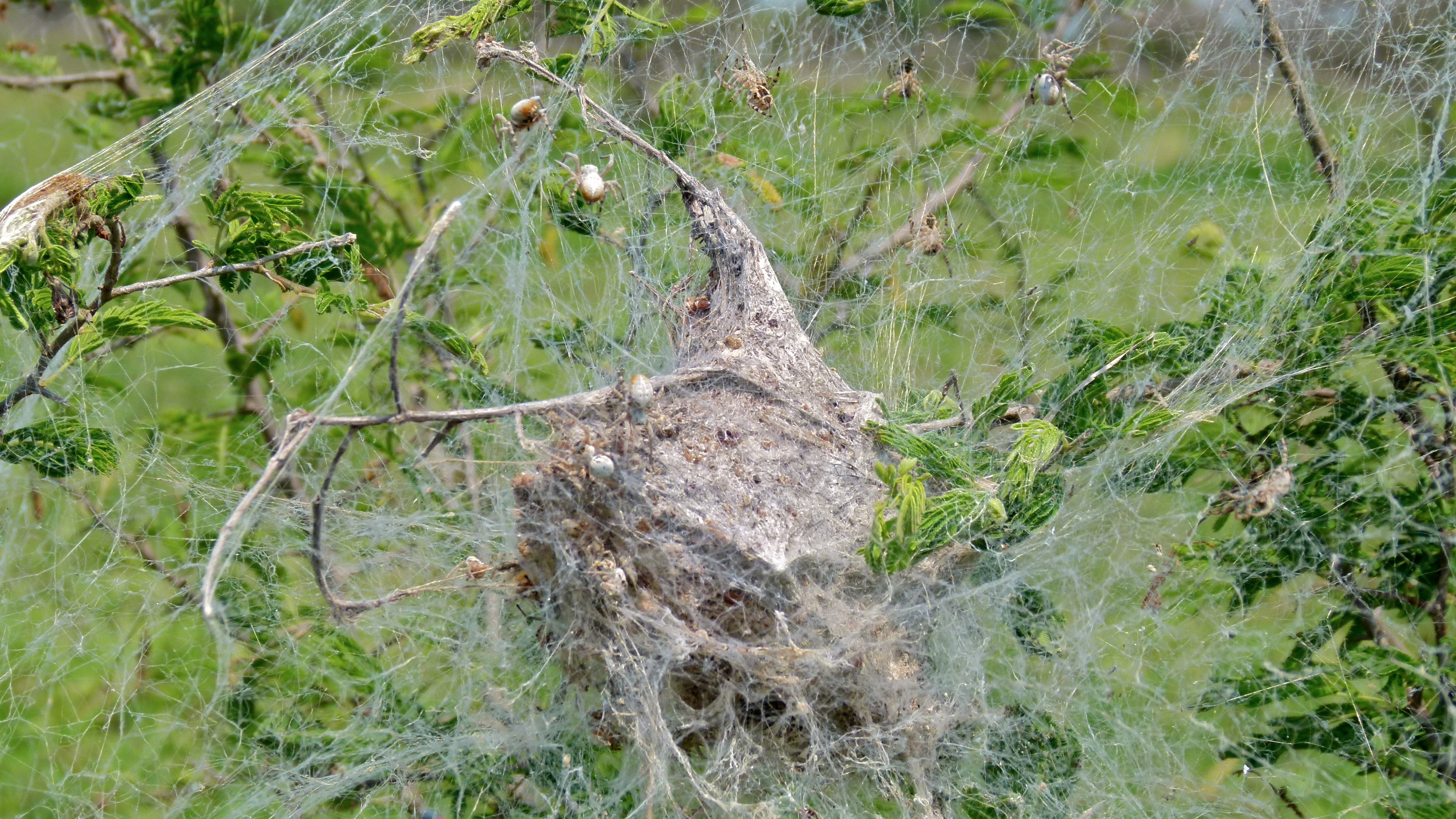
Stegodyphus dumicola nest

== Population structure, speciation, and phylogeny ==
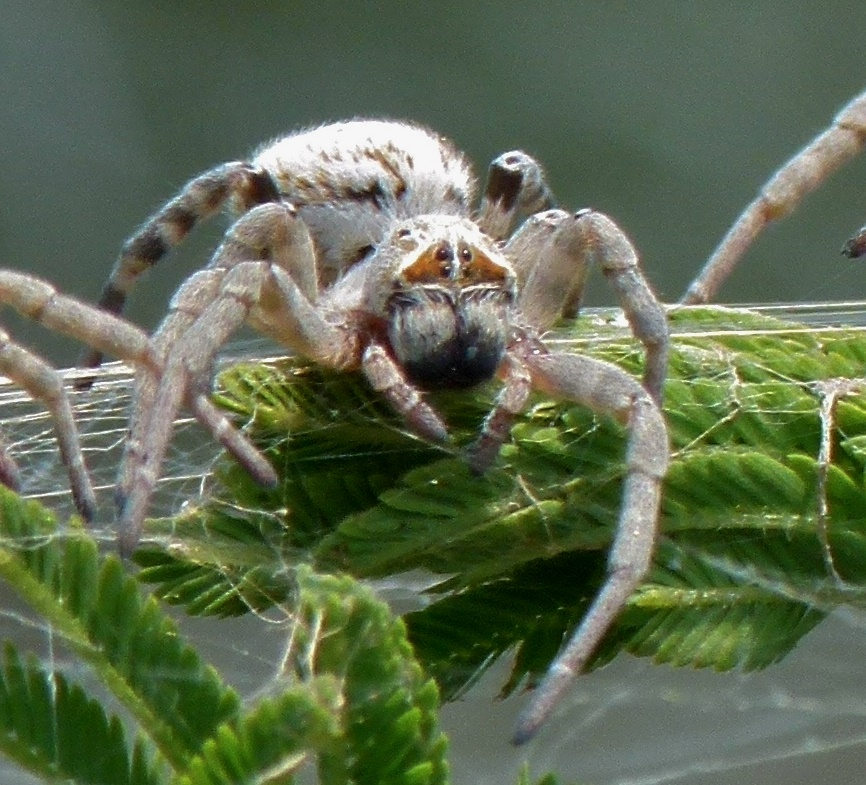
S. dumicola on its web

Stegodyphus dumicola live in groups with a high female to male sex ratio. Population founding is the responsibility of females: groups of related or unrelated females disperse upon maturation to create a new nest. The secondary sex ratio is 12% males on average. Among the females in the colony, roughly 40% mate, while the other 60% remain virgins and participate in brood care.

=== Genetic population structure ===
Although there are high levels of inbreeding and colony isolation in the Stegodyphus dumicola, there is high variation in mitochondrial DNA in spiders of this species. Studies have found four lineages that compose a total of 15 haplotypes. Different lineages had twelve to twenty-nine substitution differences, mainly in the ND1 region (2.65-6.00% substitution rate. Within the same lineage, one to five substitutions were found (1.50-2.50%).

== Habitat and distribution ==
Stegodyphus dumicola can be found in Southwestern regions of Africa. This spider is frequently found in areas of Namibia except the Namib Desert. They specifically reside in mesic to semi-arid woodlands of the hot and dry thornbush country. In the savanna, the temperature of nests can exceed forty degrees Celsius.

In South Africa, the species inhabits all biomes except the Desert biome at altitudes ranging from 7 to 1,758 m above sea level. Notable locations in South Africa include Kruger National Park, Karoo National Park, Table Mountain National Park, and Tswalu Kalahari Reserve.

== Diet ==
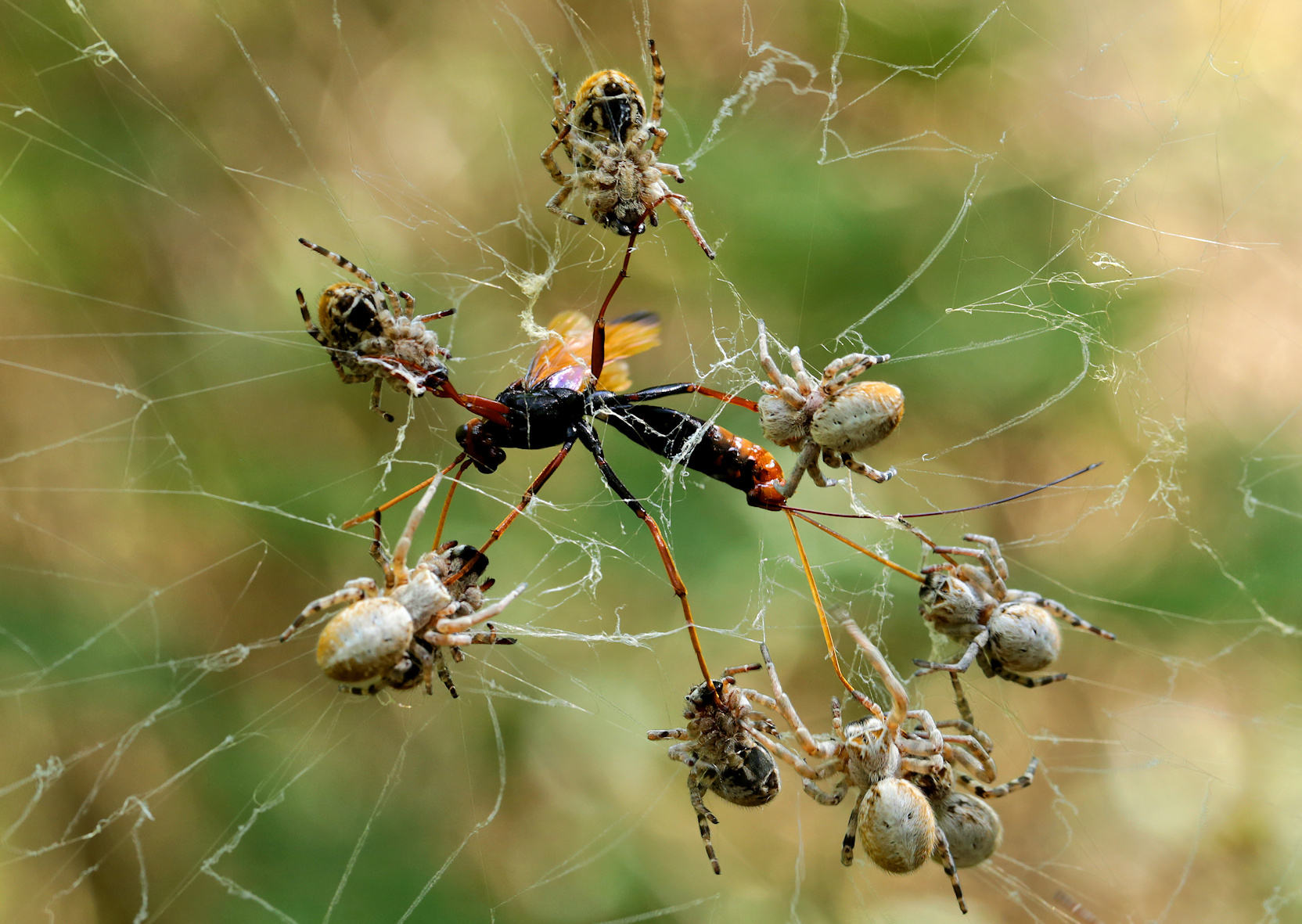
Females capturing an ichneumonid wasp.

=== Spiderling ===
==== Non-reproductive cannibalism ====
When the spiderlings are second-stage instars, females will capture prey and regurgitate a nourishing fluid. Once spiderlings reach final instars, females sacrifice their bodies for the kin. In an act of matriphagy, spiderlings mount the female's dorsal region and consume her bodily fluids until she dies. This phenomenon has been further classified as gerontophagy, because the brood will feed on old females, regardless of whether or not the female was related to the kin.

=== Spider ===
==== Predatory feeding ====
Larger spiders are more likely to take part in cooperative prey capture. During capture, many females will engage with the prey at the same time, injecting their digestive juices into the prey through extra-oral digestion. These digestive enzymes break down the prey into a liquid for other spiders to share, or for females to regurgitate to spiderlings.

== Webs ==
=== Construction ===
Within the spider’s social group, all spiders in the group take part in web construction, maintenance, and prey capture. Nests are large web structures composed of a compact combination of silk and nearby branch or desert brush. These nests are built in spiny bush twigs or trees close to the ground at a height of 0.5 to 1.5 meters high. The exterior is layered in a grey fiber tissue (one to two centimeters thick).

Aside from a dense outer layer, the nests consist of a tunnel network system. The interior silk is closely textured and contains tunnels where the spiders mainly occupy. To expand the nest, females will perform local budding of different nests when this female disperses after mating. Budded nests are typically no farther than five meters away from the home nest.

=== Web type ===
Stegodyphus dumicola are classified as orb-weaving spiders. Compact silk, spongy colony nests are roughly 5 centimetres (1.96850 in) to 30 centimetres (12 in) in diameter and will vary based on the spider colony size. When new females create a new colony, webs will begin as monodomous, where there is a single isolated nest. As more generations begin to occupy the colony, these larger group nests are described as polydomous, where many nests are connected throughout with one web.

Cribellar sheets extend from the nest, where entrances face down and the regions above are blocked off. These sheets have been found as a defense mechanism from predatorial A. steingroeveri attacks.

The nest of the web has been discovered to be detrimental to thermoregulation, where temperatures inside the nest have been found to exceed forty degrees celsius. Relative humidity has been found to be lower compared to the surrounding environment. The nest does not provide protection from bushfire or general dehydrating conditions, but does provide protection from other environmental dangers (wind, hail, sun-related radiation)

=== Prey capture technique ===
Within the large, webbed nest, several prey-capture regions are interspersed within housing tunnels. Spiders are compelled to retrieve snagged prey upon vibratory cues. The Stegodyphus dumicola have been found to follow a “shy” and a “bold” personality, where shy spiders are latent and do not respond to prey capture stimuli, and bold spiders are active and seek to forage. Smaller spiders tend to have a bold personality.

== Reproduction and life cycle ==
=== Lifespan ===
Generations of Stegodyphus dumicola spiders live approximately for one year. Male Stegodyphus dumicola have shorter lifespans compared to females. Males mature faster, and die a few weeks after mating. Namibian female spiders have been found to mature from January to the middle of the summer, produce eggs from February to March, and live until April to June to take care of the brood and later be consumed by the kin. Adult females are the ones who leave to create new colonies. If a female chooses to leave and create a new colony, this was found to occur from January to March.

=== Mating ===
Spiders do not travel far to mate and will typically mate in the natal colony, leading to high levels of inbreeding. Males will begin to fight over female territory in the breeding season and will compete for females. They will normally mate within the parent colony. If males do emigrate, they join the nests of solitary females. Females will tend to be in control during mating duration and will be selective in mate choice if they mature early. The tail end of the mating season in these spiders is from January to March.

=== Parental care ===
Within the large colonies, female spiders share maternal care of the brood, regardless of whether or not she is the mother. Roughly 60% of females in the colony remain virgins and engage in extreme allomaternal care. Egg sack maintenance, construction and defense are the responsibility of the females. Females will regurgitate captured prey to second instar brood, and later sacrifice herself in a final act of matriphagy by the time the brood reaches final instar.

== Social behavior ==
The Stegodyphus dumicola is one of only twenty to thirty spider species that is considered social. Sociality in spiders is defined as cooperative breeding in spiders that are non-territorial and permanently social. Although the Stegodyphus dumicola mainly live in groups, they have also been found to live solitarily.

Stegodyphus dumicola groups range from a few individuals to a few hundred spiders. They colonize, construct, and maintain the same web. They cooperate in caring for the young and in gathering prey. The spiders will tend to live in the same colony they were born into, leading to a group that is made of several generations of related individuals. Foraging behavior has been observed to be equally divided amongst members of the colony.

Group foraging behavior varies between colonies of different size and composition. It is more likely that smaller colonies will initiate attack early and begin an attack more quickly than larger colonies. In scientific studies, when a group had a wide range of spider behavior, level of boldness, or personality types, the group was found to initiate a response more quickly to prey. If a group was made up of spiders that were morphologically diverse (varying prosoma width), they also mounted a faster attack.

The task differentiation behavior is similar to that of Stegodyphus sarasinorum, with a likelihood of attack on prey and modulation of foraging behavior.

== Enemies ==
=== Predators ===
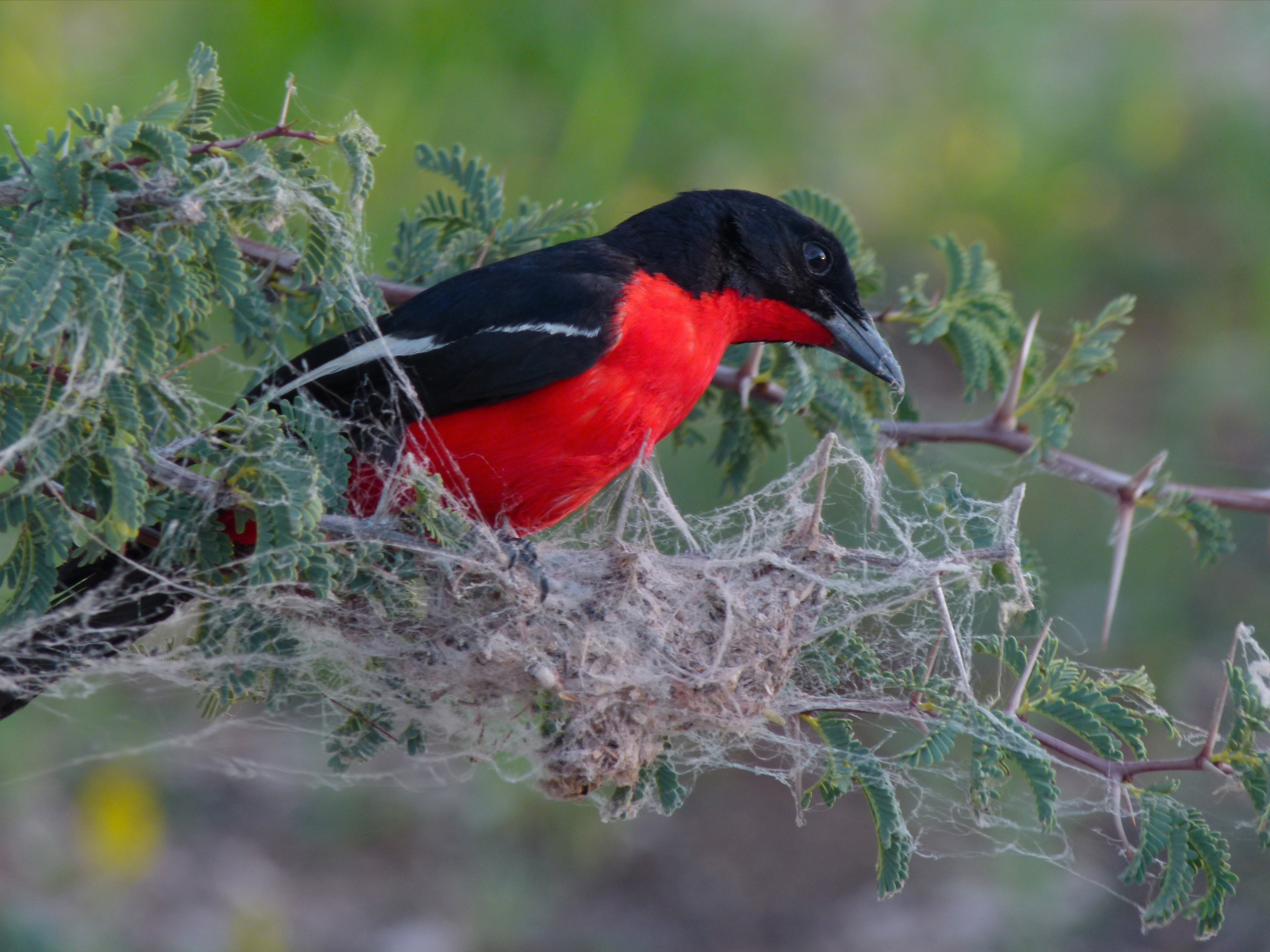
A crimson-breasted shrike feeding on a S. dumicola nest

Predators of this spider include Anoplolespsis steingroeveri (arboreal pugnacious ant), araneophagous spiders, insectivorous birds, and Pseudopompilus funereus (Pomplid Wasps).

The arboreal pugnacious ant (Anoplolespsis steingroeveri) and Stegodyphus dumicola inhabit the same trees and are commonly found together. When these ants attack, they gather in hundreds and thousands to invade for consecutive days, and might do so multiple times a year. The ants bite the female spiders to kill them, then dismember the remains and remove spider eggs. These events have been found to be extremely lethal to spider colonies. When under attack, the spiders will either weave more cribellate silk sheets to stop a swarm or gather egg cocoons and abandon the current nest.

Other predators of Stegodyphus dumicola include several other spider species (Clubionidae, Gnaphosidae, Nephila senegalensis, Salticidae, Heteropodidae, Thomisidae). Most araneophagous spiders will enter the nests; however, Nephila senegalensis would capture spiders by building a web onto the S. dumicola’s nest and hunting spiders that entered its web. There is little evidence to suggest the spiders fight back against these other spiders. S. dumicola was found to have a passive relationship with Clubionidae, Thomisidae, and Salticidae, attracted to Nephila senegalensis, and completely defenseless to Heteropodidae and Gnaphosidae . Solitary spiders were found to be captured by other spiders at a higher frequency compared to social variants.

=== Diseases ===
The Stegodyphus dumicola commonly falls to widespread fungal infection. Larger, spongey nests are susceptible to fungus propagation because they tend to allow for a moist environment. If the nest is able to dry in the sunlight, fungal growth will cease. However, if the nest remains moist for one to two days, fungal infection can decimate the nest.

== Physiology ==
=== Locomotion ===
==== Ballooning ====
Sexually mature female Stegodyphus dumicola have been witnessed to balloon as a method of dispersion to reproduce. Females will eject from ten to hundreds of strings in a triangle shape (approximately one meter large, length and width) to gain liftoff. Males have not been observed to display this behavior.

== Conservation ==
Stegodyphus dumicola is listed as Least Concern by the South African National Biodiversity Institute due to its wide geographical range. It faces no significant threats.
