= Olios correvoni =

Scientific classification
- Kingdom: Animalia
- Phylum: Arthropoda
- Subphylum: Chelicerata
- Class: Arachnida
- Order: Araneae
- Infraorder: Araneomorphae
- Family: Sparassidae
- Genus: Olios
- Species: O. correvoni

Binomial name
- Olios correvoni Lessert, 1921

Species of spider

Olios correvoni is a subspecies of spider in the family Sparassidae. It is found across southern Africa.

== Subspecies ==
O. correvoni has two subspecies:

- Olios c. choupangensis Lessert, 1936 – Mozambique
- Olios c. nigrifrons Lawrence, 1928 – Namibia, Botswana, South Africa, Eswatini, Zambia, Mozambique

== Distribution ==
O. correvoni is known from Mozambique, Namibia, Botswana, Zambia, Eswatini, and South Africa. In South Africa, the subspecies O. c. nigrifrons is recorded from all provinces at altitudes ranging from 34 to 1,470 m above sea level.

== Habitat and ecology ==
O. correvoni are nocturnal plant dwellers that wander around in search of prey on the vegetation. Olios correvoni nigrifrons has been sampled from coastal bush and dune forest in Mozambique. In South Africa, it occurs in the Fynbos, Indian Ocean Coastal Belt, Grassland, Nama Karoo and Savanna biomes. A specimen from Namibia was collected from an old Stegodyphus nest.

== Conservation ==
Olios correvoni nigrifrons is listed as least concern by the South African National Biodiversity Institute due to its wide geographical range across southern Africa. The subspecies is protected in more than 10 protected areas including Kruger National Park, Ndumo Game Reserve, Tswalu Nature Reserve, Nylsvley Nature Reserve, Blouberg Nature Reserve and Augrabies National Park.

== Taxonomy ==
Olios correvoni was originally described by Lessert in 1921 from Tanzania. The subspecies O. c. nigrifrons was described by Lawrence in 1928 from Namibia.
