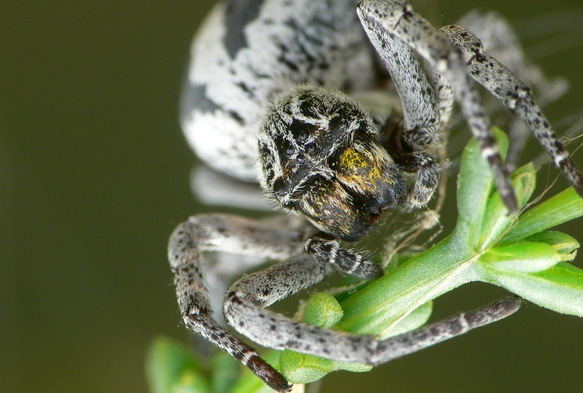

Scientific classification
- Kingdom: Animalia
- Phylum: Arthropoda
- Subphylum: Chelicerata
- Class: Arachnida
- Order: Araneae
- Infraorder: Araneomorphae
- Family: Eresidae
- Genus: Stegodyphus
- Species: S. lineatus

Binomial name
- Stegodyphus lineatus (Latreille, 1817)

Synonyms
- Eresus lineatus Latreille, 1817; Eresus acanthophilus Dufour, 1820; Eresus unifasciatus C.L. Koch, 1846; Eresus adspersus C.L. Koch, 1846; Eresus fuscifrons C.L. Koch, 1846; Eresus lituratus C.L. Koch, 1846; Stegodyphus adspersus (Simon, 1873); Stegodyphus molitor Simon, 1873; Eresus arenarius Kroneberg, 1875; Stegodyphus quadriculatus Franganillo, 1925

= Stegodyphus lineatus =

Species of spider

Stegodyphus lineatus is the only European species of the spider genus Stegodyphus. In the pet trade it has been called the desert velvet spider. Male S. lineatus can grow up to 12 mm long while females can grow up to 15 mm. The colour can range from whitish to almost black. In most individuals the opisthosoma is whitish with two broad black longitudinal stripes. Males and females look similar, but the male is generally richer in contrast and has a bulbous forehead. The species name refers to the black lines on the back of these spiders (not present in all individuals). S. lineatus is found in the southern Mediterranean region of Europe (south of Barcelona, in Sicily, southern Greece including Crete) and as far east as Tajikistan.

Drawings from CL Koch (1846) (now all S. lineatus)

Female from France

Female from Southern Europe

Female from Egypt

Female from Egypt

== Behavior ==
Stegodyphus lineatus can be found in desert habitats, especially in the Negev desert in Israel and dry Mediterranean climates. These spiders build a web between twigs, mostly residing in low thorny shrubs. They prefer to build their webs in prey concentrated areas; in the desert, this usually means being near plant growth, which would attract prey like pollinating insects. The web has a diameter of about 30 cm (12 in) and is attached to a retreat made out of silk and covered with debris and food remains. The retreat is a cone-shaped structure about 5 cm (2 in) long, which has an entrance at one end. The spiderlings hatch in this retreat, being released from their cocoon by their mother and then protected by her for another two weeks. Web-building behavior uses up time and energy, but provides an advantage in the ability to catch prey. Fixing and constructing webs occurs only at night, but prey capture can occur during the day or at night. Both males and females can make webs to capture prey, but males may leave their web in search of mates. Adult males can be found in spring. Males are known to exhibit infanticide, by killing the offspring of already-mated females. Females are able to lay more than one clutch, which means infanticide can provide the male an opportunity to mate with the female. Offspring are matriphagous, meaning they eat their own mother.

== Mating behavior ==
=== Courtship behavior ===
A form of courtship behaviour shown by males of this species is creating vibrations on the female's webs before mating. The purpose of these vibrations is to make the female more willing to mate. It is suggested that females may create a web-borne pheromone that causes males to display this web vibrating behavior.

=== Polyandrous behavior ===
Females can mate with multiple males (with as many as five), but it is not necessarily advantageous, because unnecessary matings waste time and energy. Polyandry may contribute to outbreeding if females preferentially mate with unrelated males. Polyandry can occur if the benefits of mating more than once are greater than the costs. It can also occur if males force female spiders to mate again through infanticide because females can lay multiple clutches, even though mating multiple times is against the female's interests because it generally reduces the female's fitness.

=== Fitness consequences of polyandrous behavior ===
While females may gain some benefits from multiple matings, polyandry is costly, and mated females are often aggressive towards males (see below). An increase in the number of matings for an individual is disadvantageous for a female's health because it decreases the number of offspring they can have. Having a male in their web also causes females to catch less prey because they repair their web less often and forage less while the male is present; the male also eats some of the captured prey. Males often stay two to three days in a female's nest, but have been known to stay up to 18 days.

==== Infanticide from female perspective ====
Infanticide occurs when males attempt to increase their fitness by destroying eggs sacs of females fertilized by other males. Female fitness is greatly reduced by the loss of their young, with the female being less likely to survive until her next lot of offspring can hatch, as well as having fewer eggs the second time. Their offspring also hatch later in the season and are less likely to thrive themselves. This contributes to why females who have already mated are more likely to be aggressive toward a male entering their nest than females who have not mated yet. Males can sustain injuries in these battles with the larger females, and in some cases the female not only kills, but eats the male intruder. However, males still take this risk, resulting in sexual conflict that leads to the destruction of around 8% of egg sacs.

=== Fitness benefits of polyandrous behavior ===
One reason for why polyandry remains, despite its negative effect on female's health, is because it is very beneficial to males. Males may chance upon only one or two mates in their entire lifetime. Polyandry in Stegodyphys lineatus avoids inbreeding and reduces the genetic incompatibilities with matings of related individual. The increased genetic diversity that results from polyandrous behaviour carry genetic benefits that outweigh the costs.

==== Infanticide from male perspective ====
Infanticide increases males’ ability to force females who have already mated to mate again with them. Egg sacs are lost quite frequently due to predation by ants and for this reason females are able to lay another clutch if they lose their first. This represents an opportunity for males, however, who can secure themselves a mate by simply disposing of her offspring (this can occur because some males are still seeking mates when most females have already laid). Males go about this by detaching the egg sac with their chelicerae, moving it to the entrance, then simply tossing it to the ground. Females take longer to replace egg sacs lost by infanticide than egg sacs lost due to other reasons. Stegodyphus lineatus eggs are unusual compared to other spiders’ because they have a small number of small eggs relative to the body size of the mother, whereas most other spiders either have a small number of large eggs or a large number of small eggs.

=== Mate search and reproductive success ===
Stegodyphus lineatus shows low rates of polygamy, and sexual selection and environmental cues play an important role during mate search and reproductive success.

==== Sexual selection ====
Some sexually selected traits help males find females faster, and these individuals are at an advantage in contrast to those males lacking these traits. Evolution has allowed traits to be selected during sexual selection. These traits provide males an advantage to find females faster in contrast to those males lacking these traits. Sexual selection allows males to receive receptivity signals from females, in the form of pheromones which are detected by the males. Mature females release a pheromone to reduce their attractiveness towards males due to the high costs of re-mating for the egg sac (infanticide mentioned above). Mature females are aggressive towards males due to infanticide caused by males, which is costly to the females. However, a high chance of multiple mates can increase the likelihood of genetic compatibility in embryo formation. Although multiple mates can increase the likelihood of genetic compatibility, it cannot be considered a major fitness advantage. Research and experimenting has been able to show that the increased viability of embryos—due to increased genetic compatibility—did not significantly increase the number of individuals in the population over time, and therefore, did not play a significant role in the fitness of the overall population. More over, males receive 50% more success fertilizing eggs in mature females than in virgin females who may have yet have reached maturity. Since males mature on average 16 days earlier than females, they encounter immature virgin females frequently, but these females are not mature enough to allow the egg sac to develop.

==== Genetic variation due to mating and environmental cues ====
Environmental cues, for example when the mating season changes, decrease the rate at which a male encounters virgins. Encountering fewer virgins will lead to encountering already mated females. Since males mature earlier than the females, they migrate to other nests to look for females in order to fertilize eggs and increase paternity, this allows genetic variation to take place in populations, alongside inbreeding which also takes place amongst this species. The cost of inbreeding is low, and females show no avoidance to this behaviour. Since inbreeding does occur, but at low rates, random mating allows genetic diversity to occur. Migration promotes genetic variation due to decreasing the rates of inbreeding through the introduction of males from other nests. Migration thus promotes genetic differentiation. Instances of migration that influence genetic variation can be observed through: natal philopatry (the tendency for an organism to stay near or return to where it was born) and founder events (when a small subset of a population founds a new population in a different location) lead to the survival of some individuals and the extinction of others. This results in enhanced genetic variance among mating groups. More over, when siblings, males or females disperse to nearby nests, random mating occurs, which will enhance the differentiation among spiders in the following generation.

Multiple mating behaviour also plays a role in influencing genetic variation within populations. Examples of this behaviour include re-mating, offspring produced by multiple fathers and high rates of male infanticide. Nonrandom mating can occur in this species within sibling groups because juveniles do not travel very far from the vicinity of where they were born. The species also allows random mating due to single females colonizing new nesting sites and male migration from other nests. Female dispersal to new locations has shown to have a larger impact on enhancing genetic differences amongst offspring than can be overcome by males moving between the populations. The environment of spiders should be taken into consideration when studying the structure of a population, especially with S. lineatus that can reside in both stable and unstable conditions. In some instances, populations of spiders interbreed due to movement of juveniles. Some juveniles settle and mate in their maternal nests, introducing clusters of siblings in a nest.

== Maternal care ==
Similar to other Stegodyphus species such as Stegodyphus sarasinorum, S. lineatus also exhibits matriphagy. The act of reproduction, regarding the female, leads to an increase of digestive enzymes. This allows her to eat more prey and to stock more nutrients. The digestive enzymes then start to digest the inside of the organism itself, except for the heart, guts, and mostly the ovaries. Once the offspring are born, and until the mother dies, the mother regurgitates for two weeks the fluids stocked inside as highly nutritive food for the progeny. Ninety-five per cent of the mother's mass is digested by the offspring. They will grow to three times their original size between their birth and dispersion. During the period when female spiders are caring for their hatched offspring, the mothers do not eat, and their offspring only eat the food that the mother regurgitates along with the mother's body at the end of this time.
