= Stegodyphus sabulosus =

Dark Stegodyphus Velvet Spider

Conservation status
- Least Concern (SANBI Red List)

Scientific classification
- Kingdom: Animalia
- Phylum: Arthropoda
- Subphylum: Chelicerata
- Class: Arachnida
- Order: Araneae
- Infraorder: Araneomorphae
- Family: Eresidae
- Genus: Stegodyphus
- Species: S. sabulosus

Binomial name
- Stegodyphus sabulosus Tullgren, 1910

Species of spider

Stegodyphus sabulosus is a species of spider in the family Eresidae. It is found in Kenya, Tanzania, Eswatini, and South Africa, where it is commonly known as the dark Stegodyphus velvet spider.

== Distribution ==
Stegodyphus sabulosus is found in four African countries: Kenya, Tanzania, Eswatini, and South Africa. In South Africa, the species is recorded only from Kruger National Park at Nwambiya Pan in Limpopo province.

== Habitat and ecology ==
The species has been sampled from the Savanna biome at altitudes ranging from 319 to 418 m above sea level.

Stegodyphus sabulosus constructs retreat-webs on vegetation.

== Description ==
Stegodyphus sabulosus is known only from the female.

== Conservation ==
Stegodyphus sabulosus is listed as Least Concern by the South African National Biodiversity Institute due to its wide geographical range. It is protected in Kruger National Park.

== Taxonomy ==
The species was originally described by Albert Tullgren in 1910 from Tanzania. It was revised by Kraus & Kraus in 1989.
