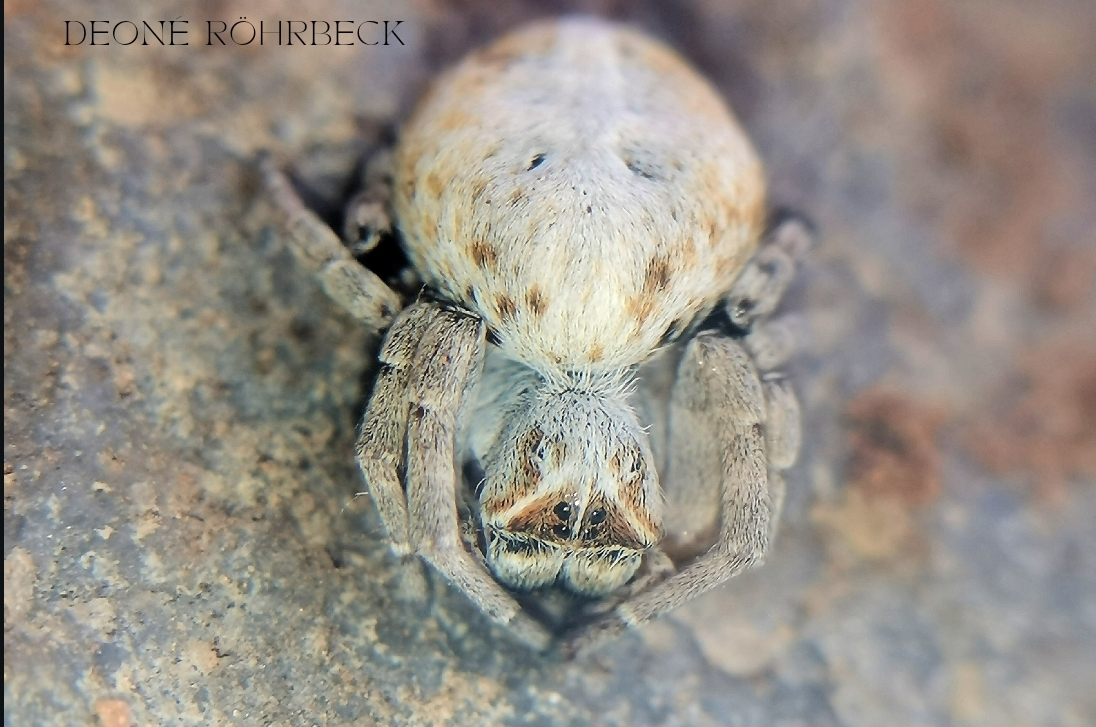
- Female
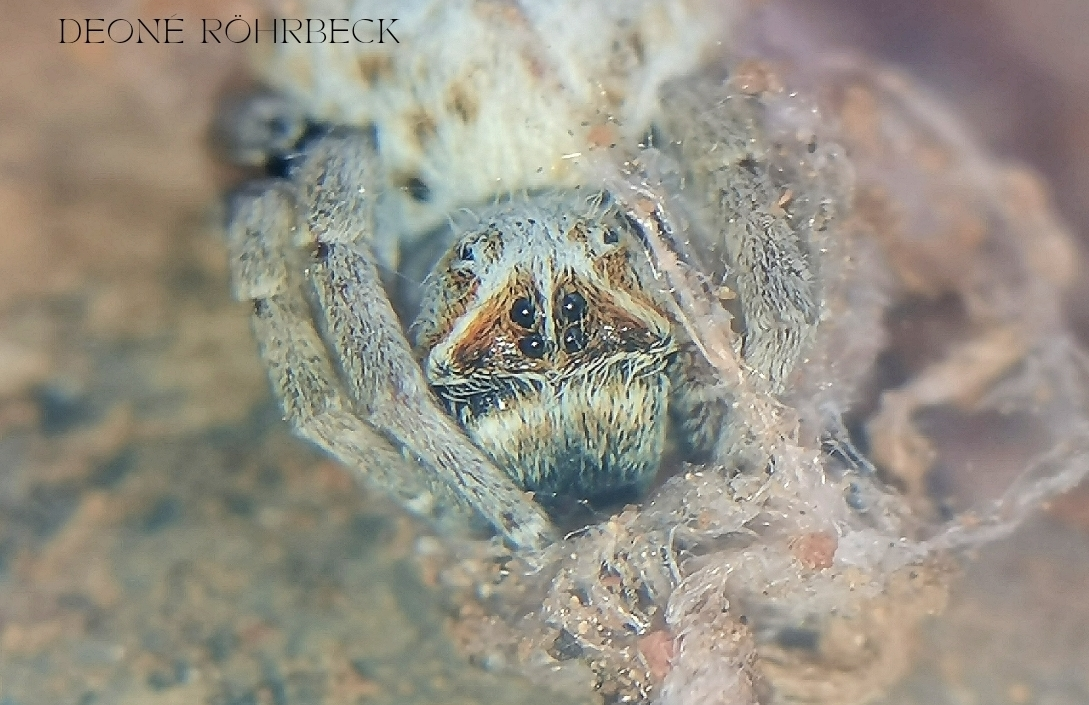
- Female

Scientific classification
- Kingdom: Animalia
- Phylum: Arthropoda
- Subphylum: Chelicerata
- Class: Arachnida
- Order: Araneae
- Infraorder: Araneomorphae
- Family: Eresidae
- Genus: Stegodyphus
- Species: S. tentoriicola

Binomial name
- Stegodyphus tentoriicola Purcell, 1904

= Stegodyphus tentoriicola =

Pale Stegodyphus Velvet Spider

Species of spider

Stegodyphus tentoriicola is a species of spider in the family Eresidae. It is found in Namibia, Botswana, and South Africa, where it is commonly known as the pale Stegodyphus velvet spider.

== Distribution ==
Stegodyphus tentoriicola occurs in Namibia, Botswana, and South Africa.

In South Africa, the species is recorded from the provinces Eastern Cape, Free State, Gauteng, Limpopo, Northern Cape, and Western Cape. Notable locations include Mountain Zebra National Park, Kgalagadi Transfrontier Park, Karoo National Park, Swartberg Nature Reserve, and Witsand Nature Reserve.

== Habitat and ecology ==
The species inhabits multiple biomes including Fynbos, Grassland and Savanna biomes at altitudes ranging from 54 to 1,722 m above sea level.

Stegodyphus tentoriicola constructs retreat webs on vegetation and has been sampled from grass heads.

== Description ==
Stegodyphus tentoriicola is known from both sexes.

== Conservation ==
Stegodyphus tentoriicola is listed as Least Concern by the South African National Biodiversity Institute due to its wide geographical range. It is protected in five protected areas.

== Taxonomy ==
The species was originally described by William Frederick Purcell in 1904 from Hanover in the Northern Cape. It was revised by Kraus & Kraus in 1989.
