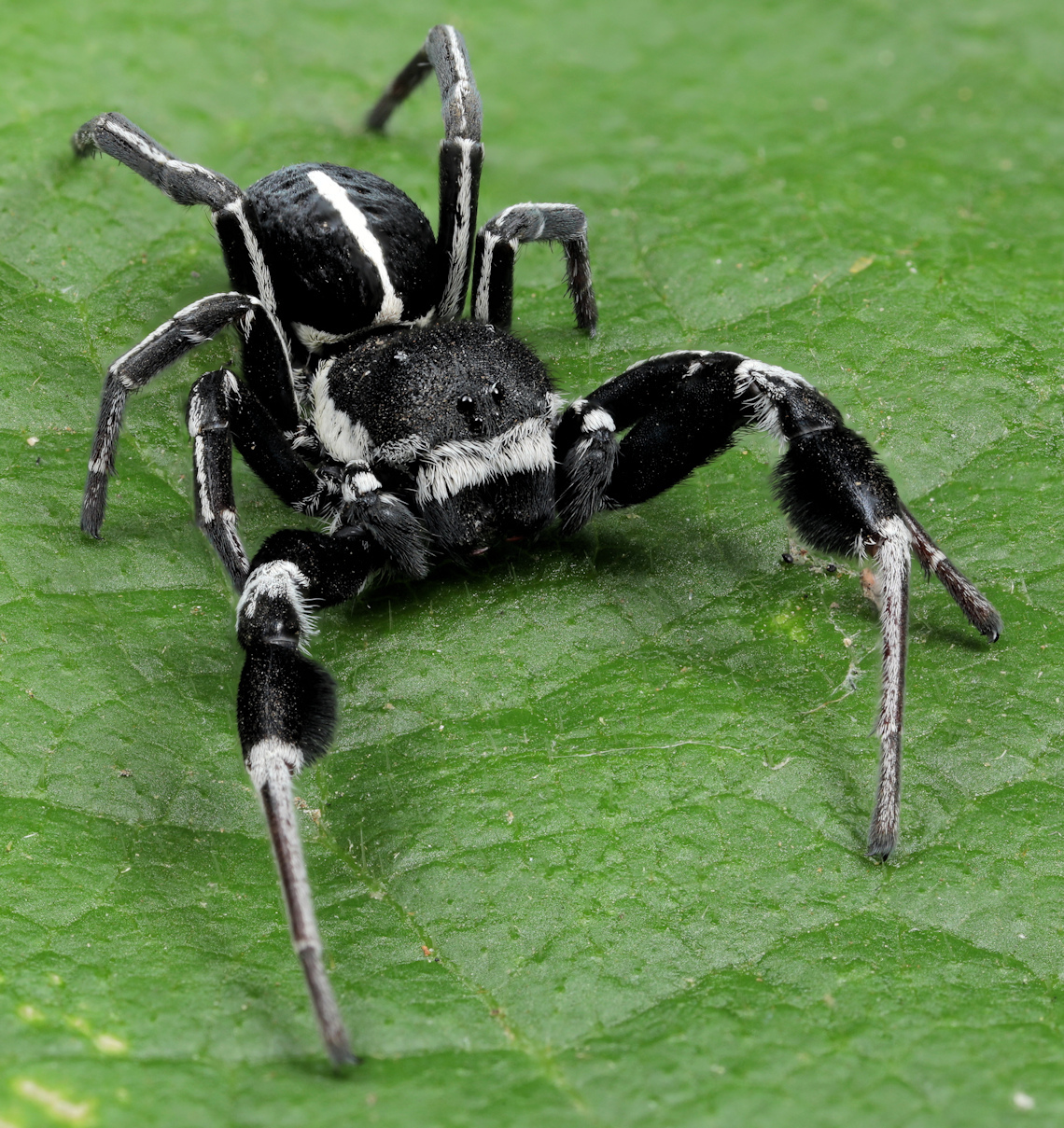
- Male
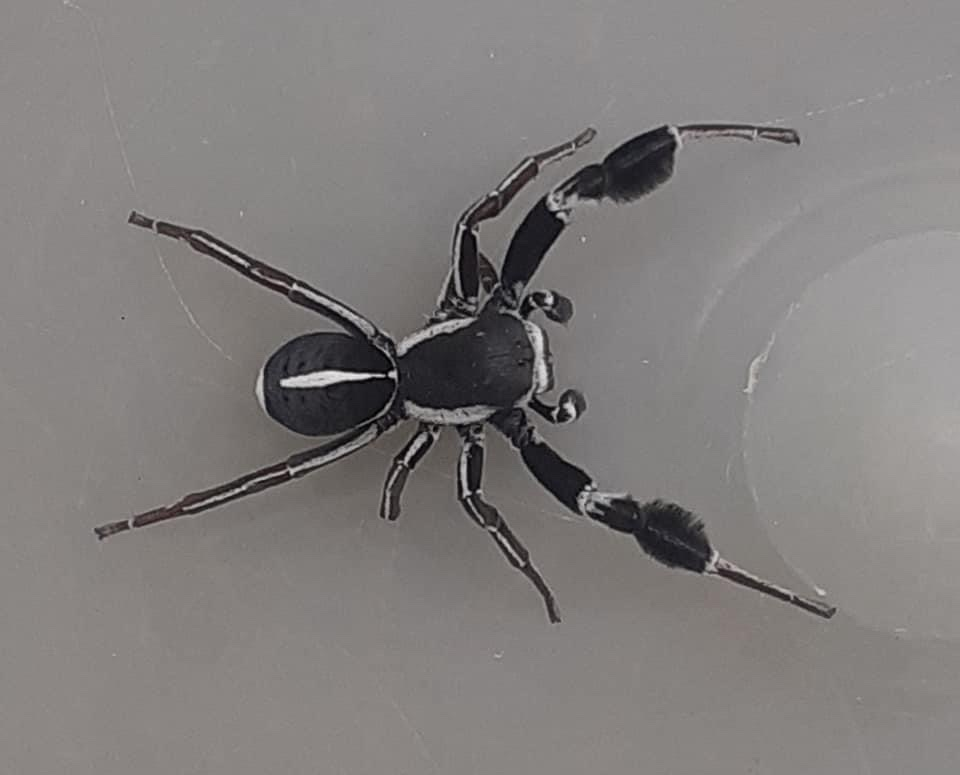
- Male

Scientific classification
- Kingdom: Animalia
- Phylum: Arthropoda
- Subphylum: Chelicerata
- Class: Arachnida
- Order: Araneae
- Infraorder: Araneomorphae
- Family: Eresidae
- Genus: Stegodyphus
- Species: S. africanus

Binomial name
- Stegodyphus africanus (Blackwall, 1866)

Synonyms
- Eresus africanus Blackwall, 1866; Stegodyphus luctuosus Simon, 1906

= Stegodyphus africanus =

African Stegodyphus Velvet Spider

Species of spider

Stegodyphus africanus is a species of spider in the family Eresidae. It is found throughout Africa. In South Africa it is commonly known as the African Stegodyphus Velvet Spider.

== Distribution ==
Stegodyphus africanus has a wide distribution throughout Africa, occurring in Cameroon, Democratic Republic of the Congo, Angola, Zimbabwe, Mozambique, Namibia, Eswatini, and South Africa. In South Africa, the species is recorded from four provinces, KwaZulu-Natal, Limpopo, Mpumalanga, and Northern Cape.

The species occurs in Ndumo Game Reserve, Blouberg Nature Reserve, Kruger National Park, and Tswalu Kalahari Reserve.

== Habitat and ecology ==
The species inhabits multiple biomes including Succulent Karoo, Grassland, Savanna and Nama Karoo biomes at altitudes ranging from 140 to 1,551 m above sea level.

Stegodyphus africanus is a plant-dweller that constructs retreat-webs on vegetation.

== Description ==
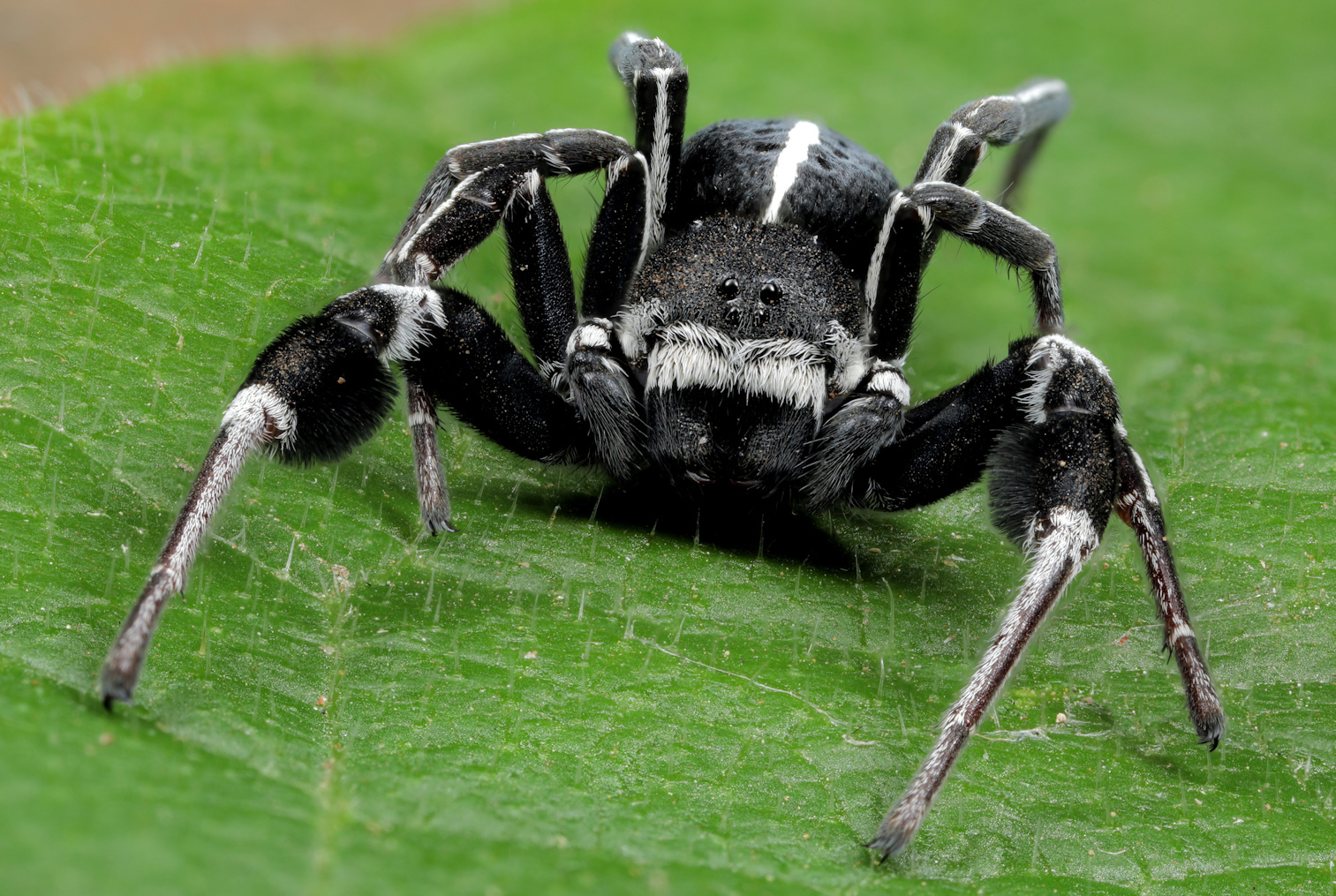
male

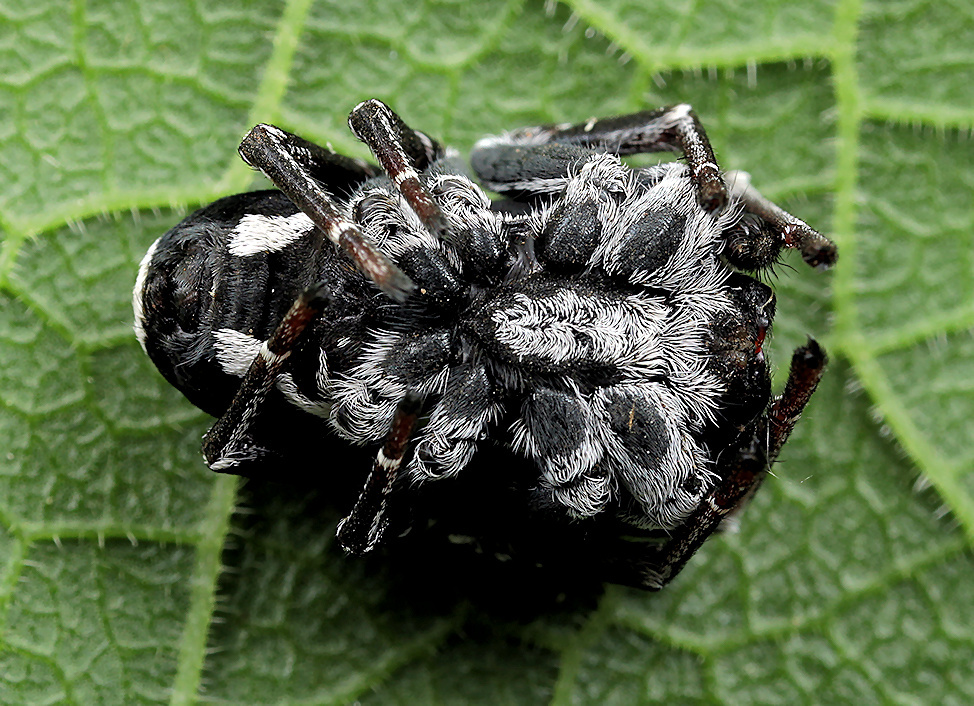
male

== Conservation ==
Stegodyphus africanus is listed as Least Concern by the South African National Biodiversity Institute due to its wide geographical range. It is protected in three protected areas including Ndumo Game Reserve, Blouberg Nature Reserve, Kruger National Park, and Tswalu Kalahari Reserve.

== Taxonomy ==
The species was originally described by John Blackwall in 1866 as Eresus africanus from French Equatorial Africa. It was revised by Kraus & Kraus in 1989.
