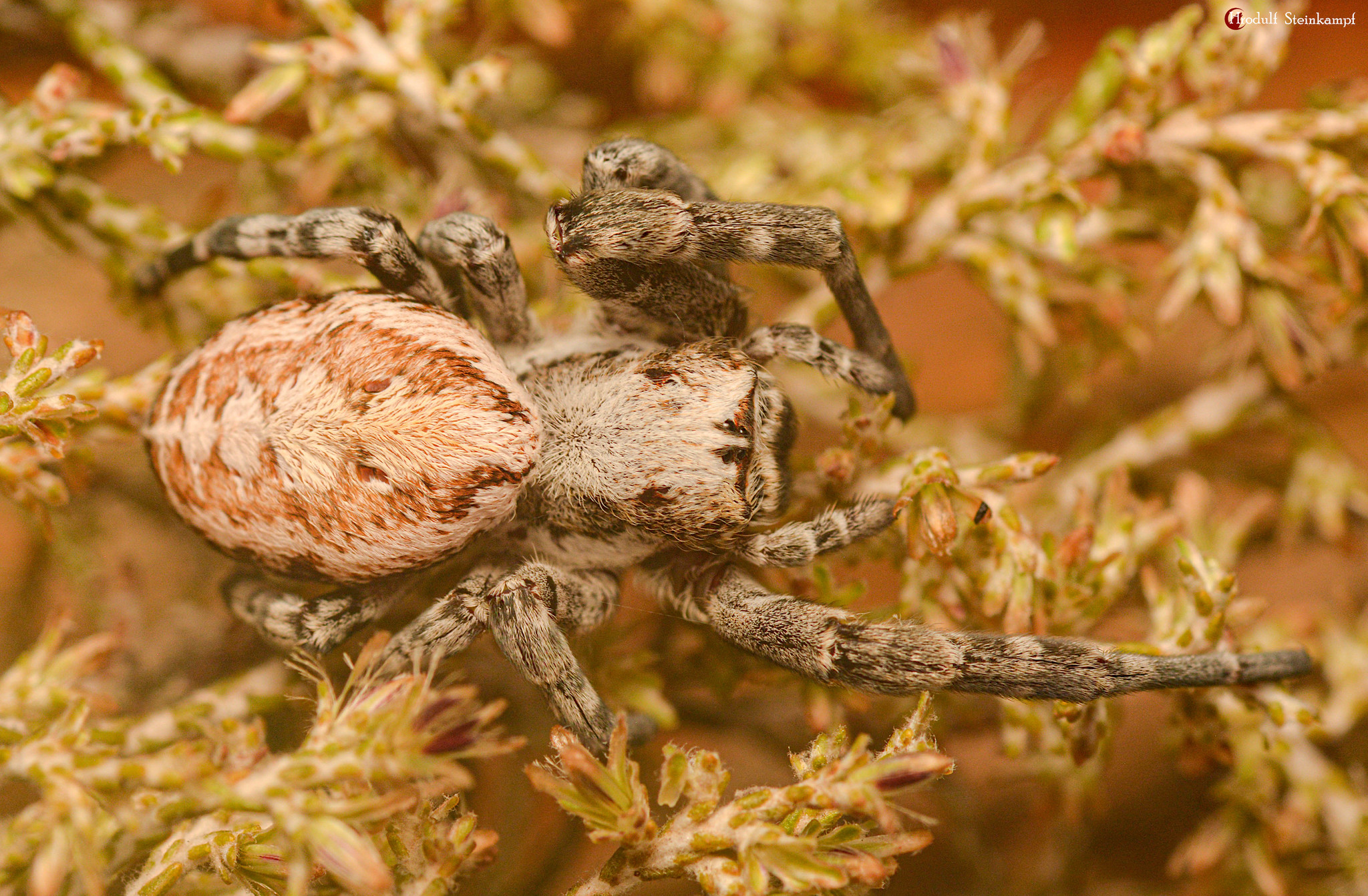
- female
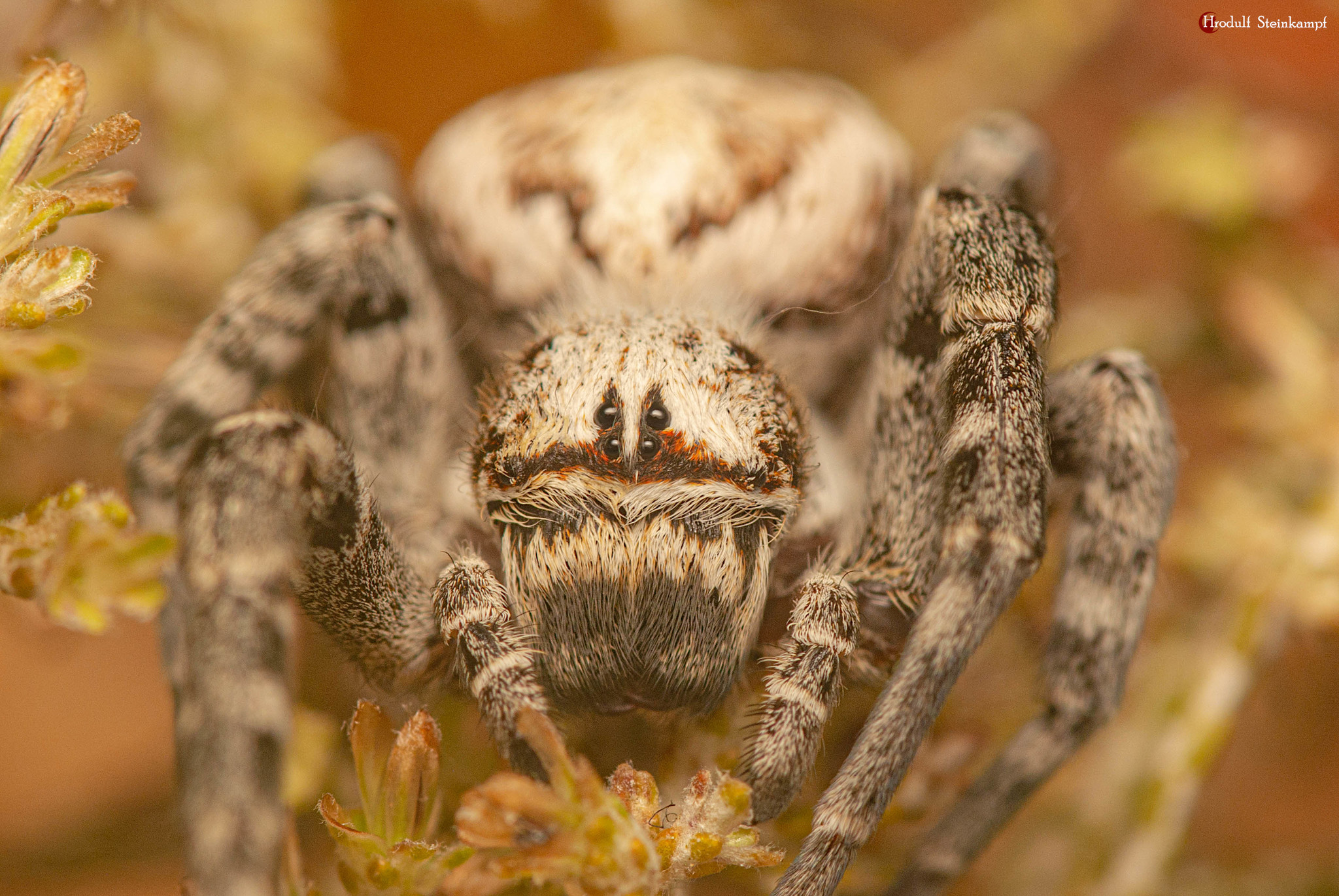
- female

Scientific classification
- Kingdom: Animalia
- Phylum: Arthropoda
- Subphylum: Chelicerata
- Class: Arachnida
- Order: Araneae
- Infraorder: Araneomorphae
- Family: Eresidae
- Genus: Stegodyphus
- Species: S. bicolor

Binomial name
- Stegodyphus bicolor (O. Pickard-Cambridge, 1869)

Synonyms
- Eresus bicolor O. Pickard-Cambridge, 1869; Stegodyphus canus Purcell, 1904; Stegodyphus filimaculatus Lawrence, 1927

= Stegodyphus bicolor =

Bicolor Stegodyphus Velvet Spider

Species of spider

Stegodyphus bicolor is a species of spider in the family Eresidae. It is found in Namibia and South Africa, where it is commonly known as the bicolor Stegodyphus velvet spider.

== Distribution ==
Stegodyphus bicolor occurs in two countries: Namibia and South Africa. In South Africa, the species is recorded from the Northern Cape, where it is protected in Augrabies National Park.

== Habitat and ecology ==
The species inhabits Desert and Succulent Karoo biomes at altitudes ranging from 33 to 720 m above sea level.

Stegodyphus bicolor constructs retreat-webs and lives solitarily in nests made with yellow-orange silk.

== Description ==
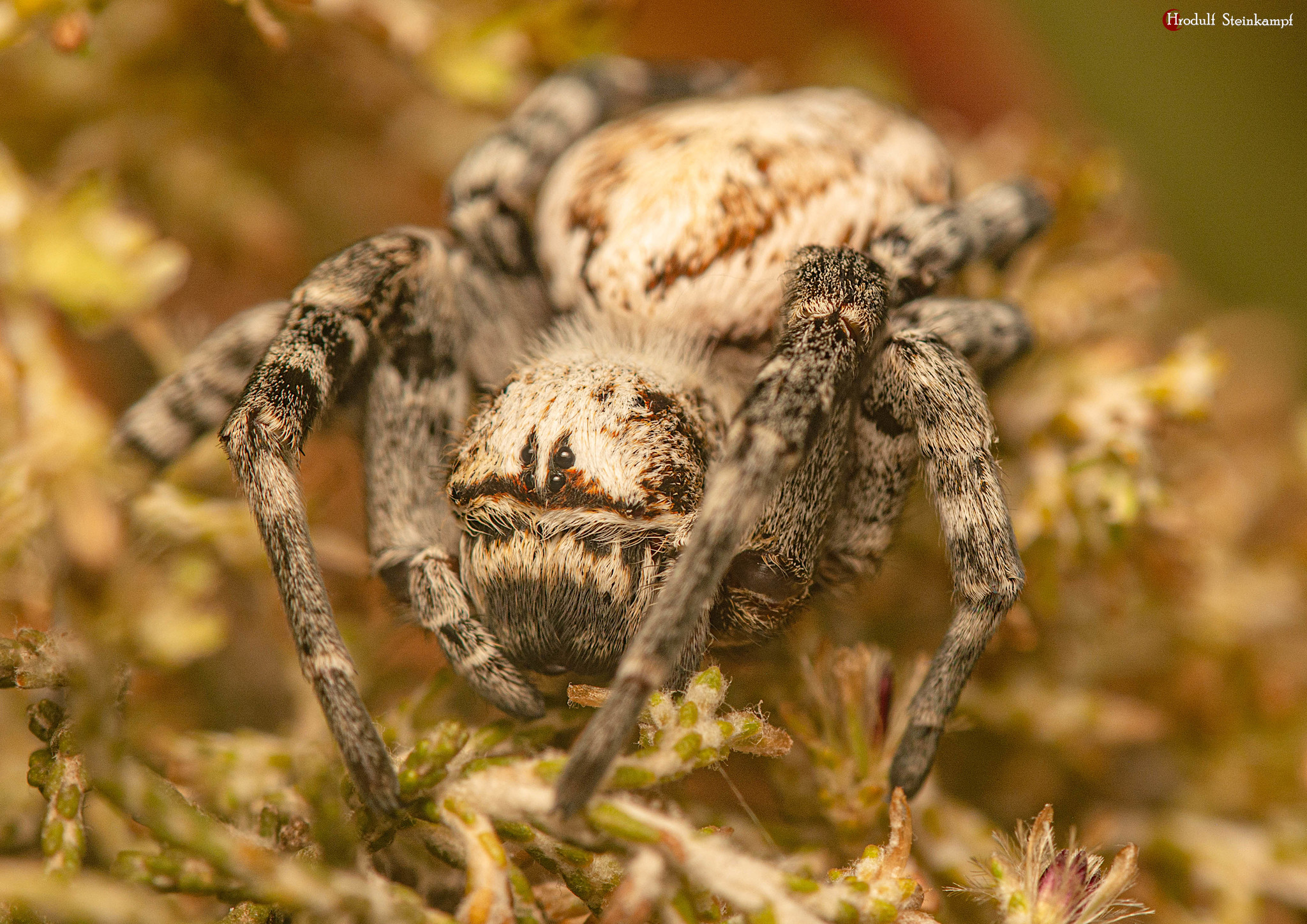
female

== Conservation ==
Stegodyphus bicolor is listed as Least Concern by the South African National Biodiversity Institute due to its wide global range. It is protected in Augrabies National Park.

== Taxonomy ==
The species was originally described by Octavius Pickard-Cambridge in 1869 as Eresus bicolor from Namibia. It was revised by Kraus & Kraus in 1989.
