= Stegodyphus mimosarum =

Species of spider

Stegodyphus mimosarum, the African social velvet spider, is a species of the genus Stegodyphus, one of the velvet spiders. It is a social species found in South Africa and Madagascar.

Similar to closely related species such as Stegodyphus sarasinorum, S. mimosarum engages in communal living which involves remaining with the same colony even when prey availability is low, moving away in order to expand the nest not due to lack of food.

== Distribution ==
Stegodyphus mimosarum is widely distributed throughout Africa and Madagascar.

In South Africa, the species is recorded from eight provinces and seven protected areas. Notable locations include Kruger National Park, Swartberg Nature Reserve, Bontebok National Park, and Ndumo Game Reserve.

== Habitat and ecology ==
In South Africa, the species inhabits multiple biomes including Fynbos, Grassland, and Savanna biomes at altitudes ranging from 17 to 1,467 m above sea level.

Stegodyphus mimosarum is a social spider that constructs retreat-webs and lives in community nests in trees.

== Description ==
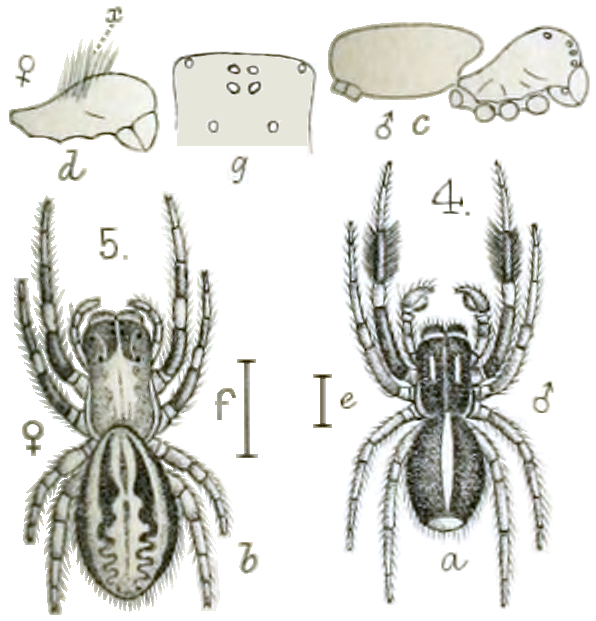
male and female

Stegodyphus mimosarum is known from both sexes.

== Conservation ==
Stegodyphus mimosarum is listed as Least Concern by the South African National Biodiversity Institute due to its wide geographical range. It is protected in more than ten protected areas.

== Taxonomy ==
The species was originally described by Pietro Pavesi in 1883. It was revised by Kraus & Kraus in 1989. The genome sequence was published in 2014.
