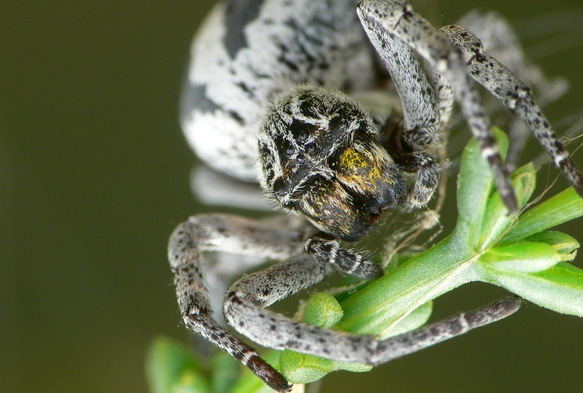
- female S. lineatus
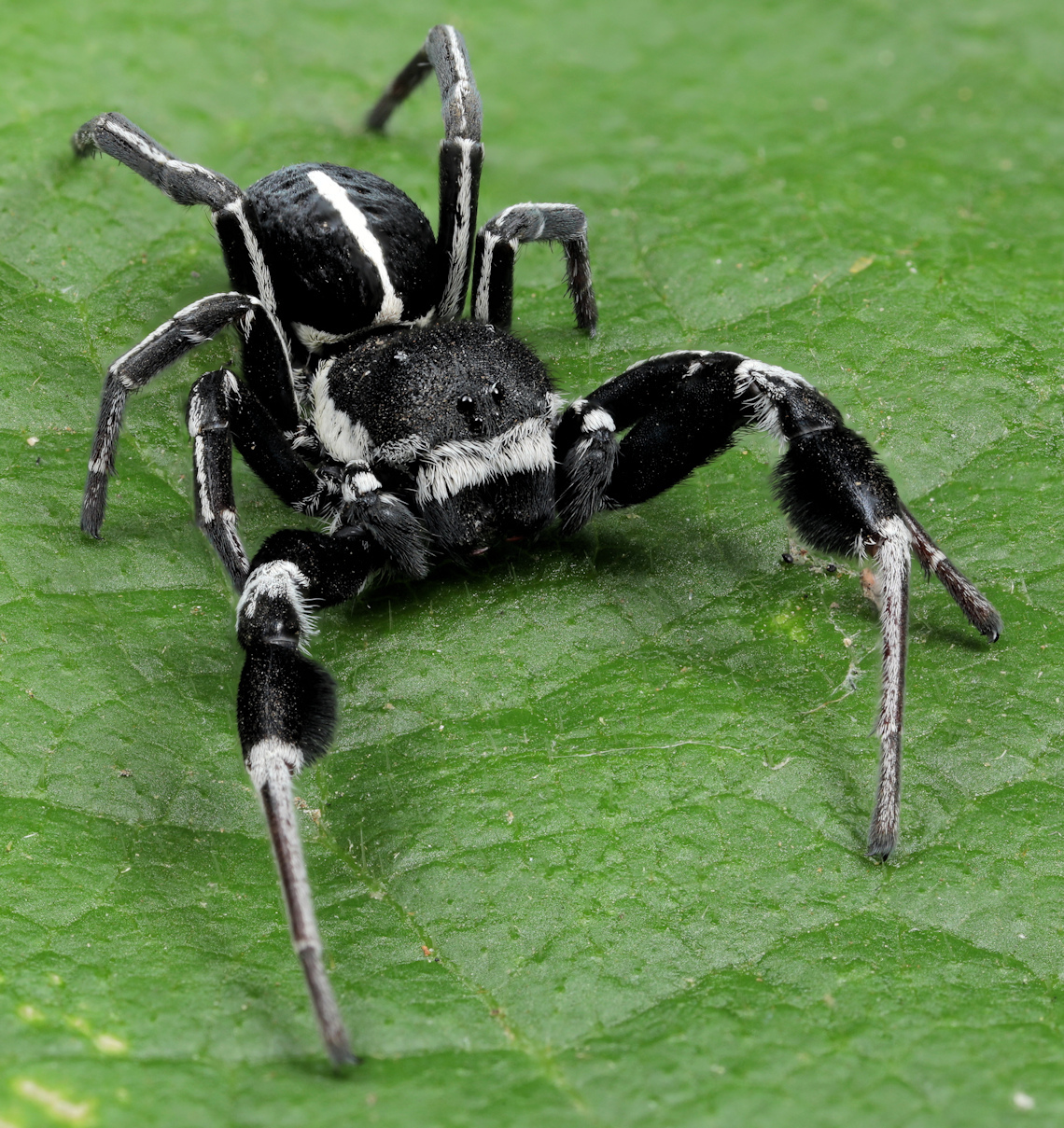
- male S. africanus

Scientific classification
- Kingdom: Animalia
- Phylum: Arthropoda
- Subphylum: Chelicerata
- Class: Arachnida
- Order: Araneae
- Infraorder: Araneomorphae
- Family: Eresidae
- Genus: Stegodyphus; Simon, 1873

Type species
- S. lineatus (Latreille, 1817)

Species
- 20, see text

Synonyms
- Magunia Lehtinen, 1967

= Stegodyphus =

Genus of spiders

Stegodyphus is a genus of velvet spiders that was first described by Eugène Simon in 1873. They are distributed from Africa to Europe and Asia, with one species (S. manaus) found in Brazil. The name is derived from Ancient Greek στέγω (stegos), meaning "covered".

== Behavior ==
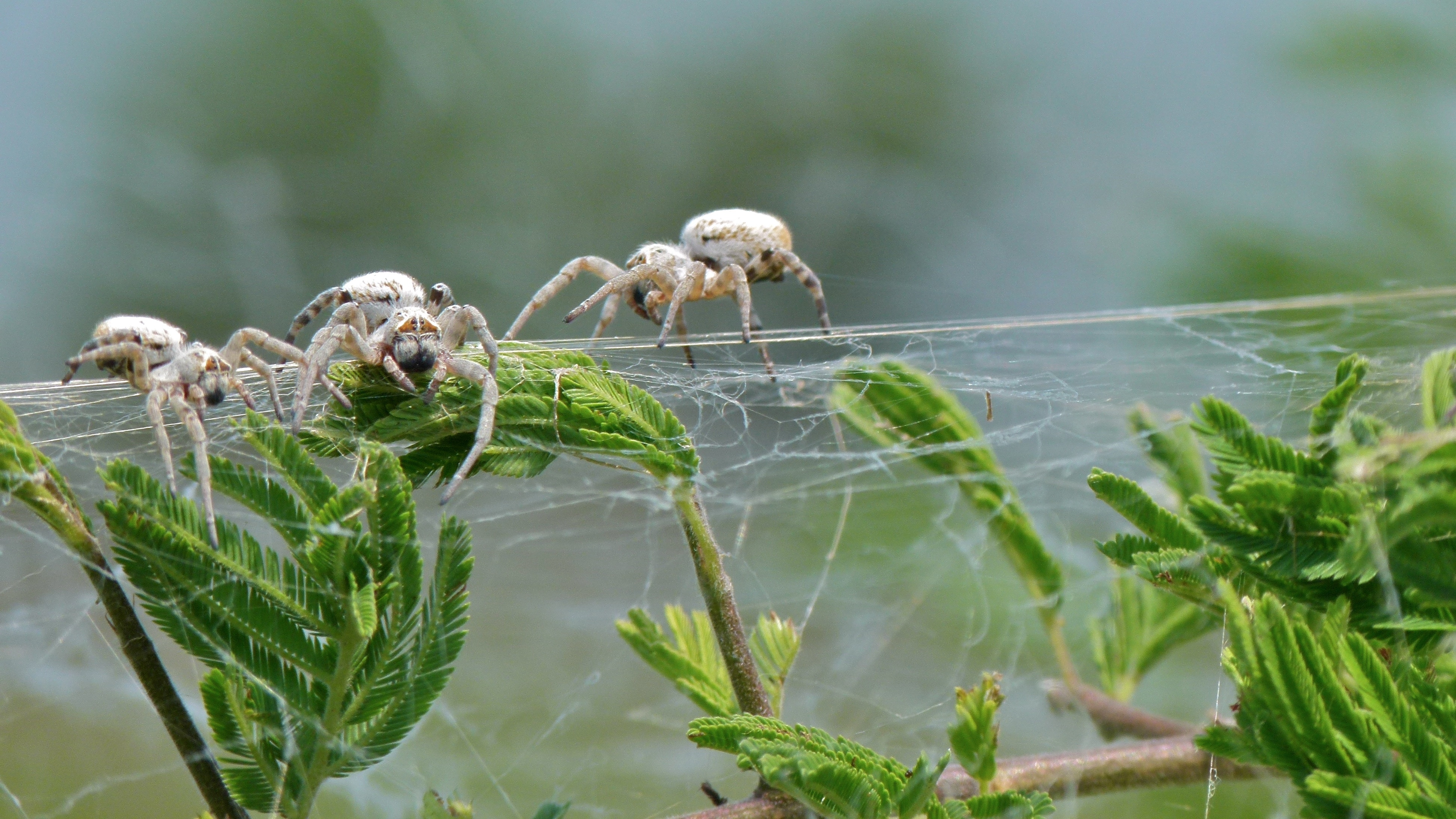
The community nesting spider, S. dumicola
Kruger National Park

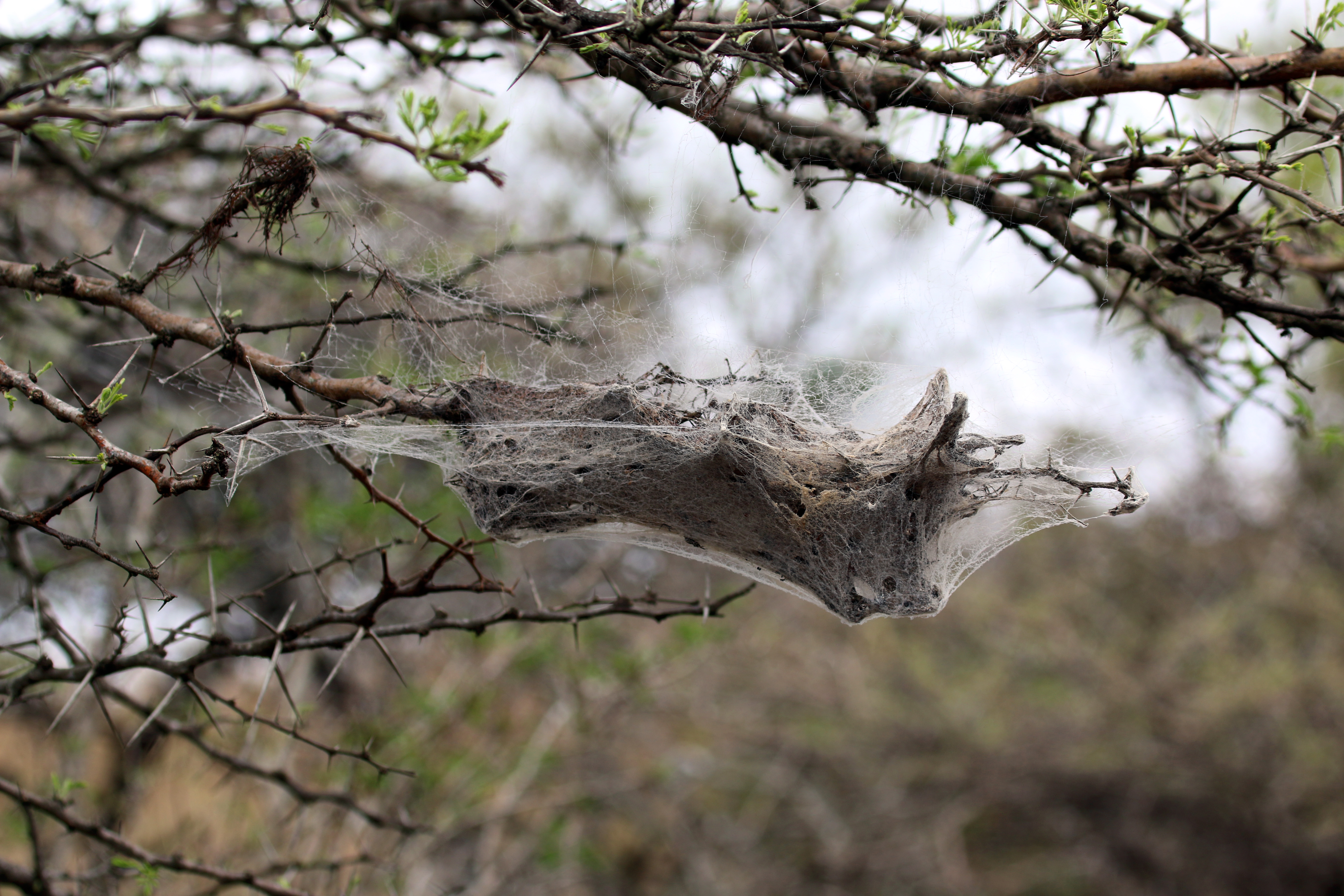
Nest of S. dumicola
KwaZulu-Natal, South Africa

At least three species are social spiders, and several are known to use ballooning as a method of dispersal.

== Species ==
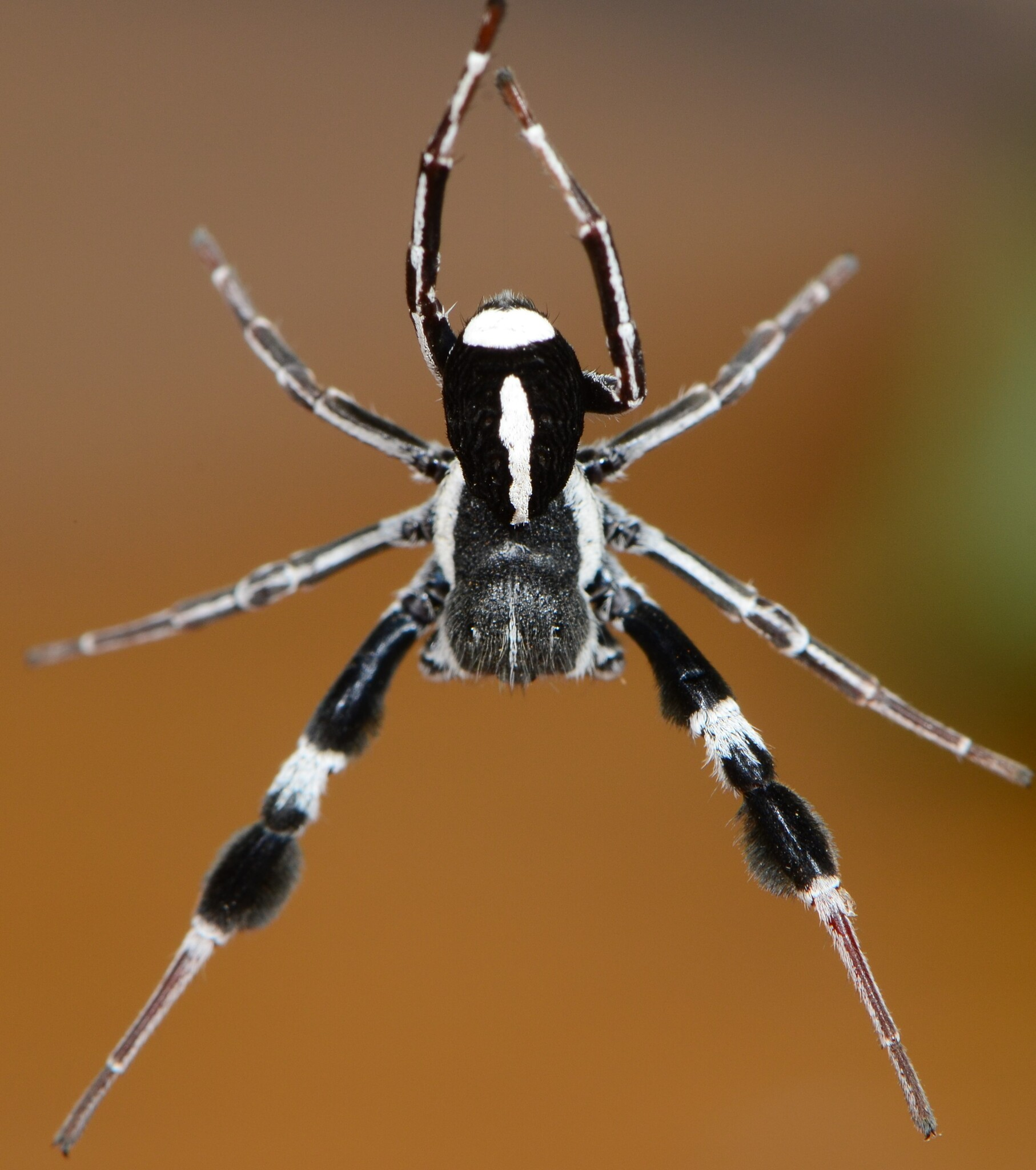
male S. mimosarum

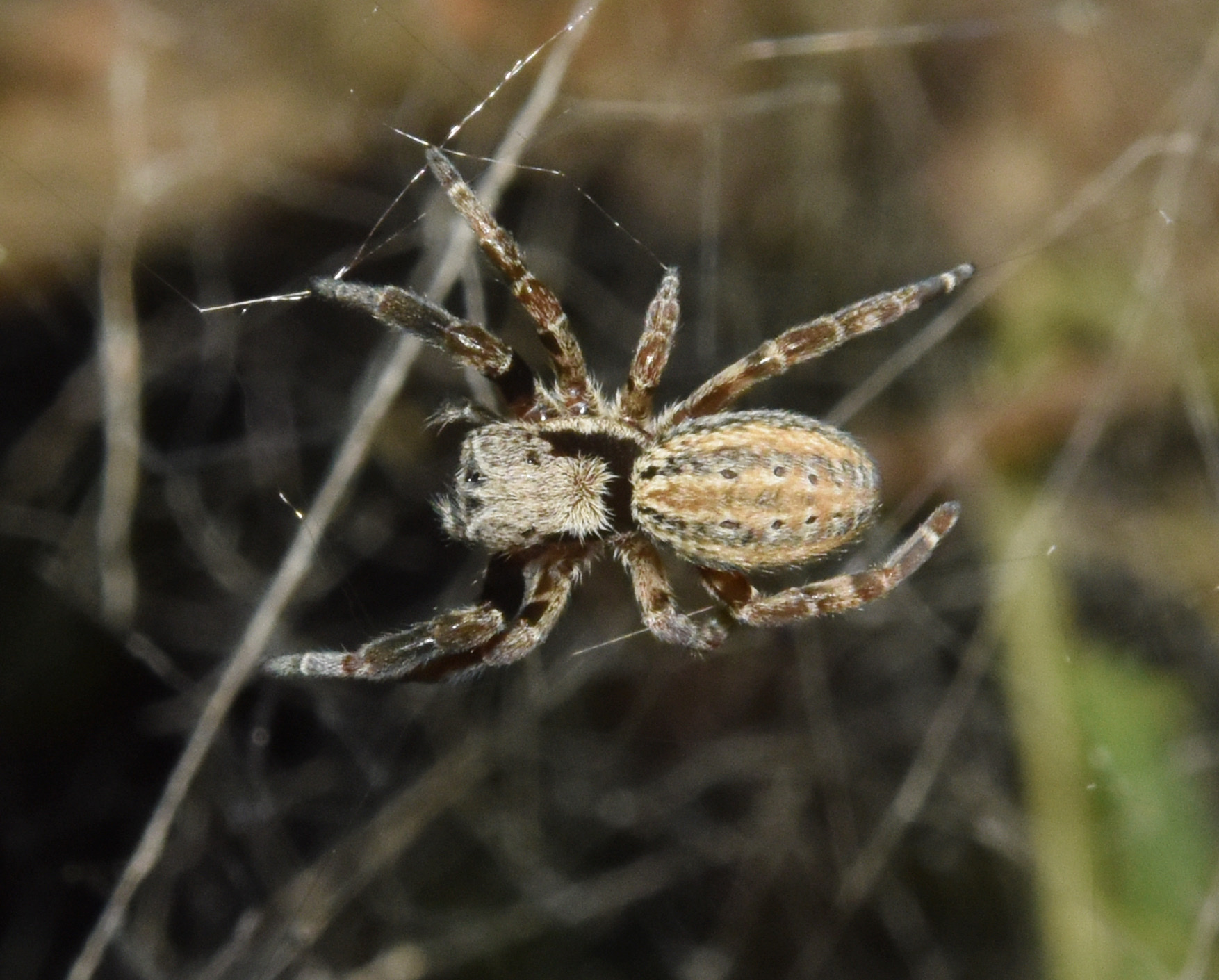
female S. mimosarum

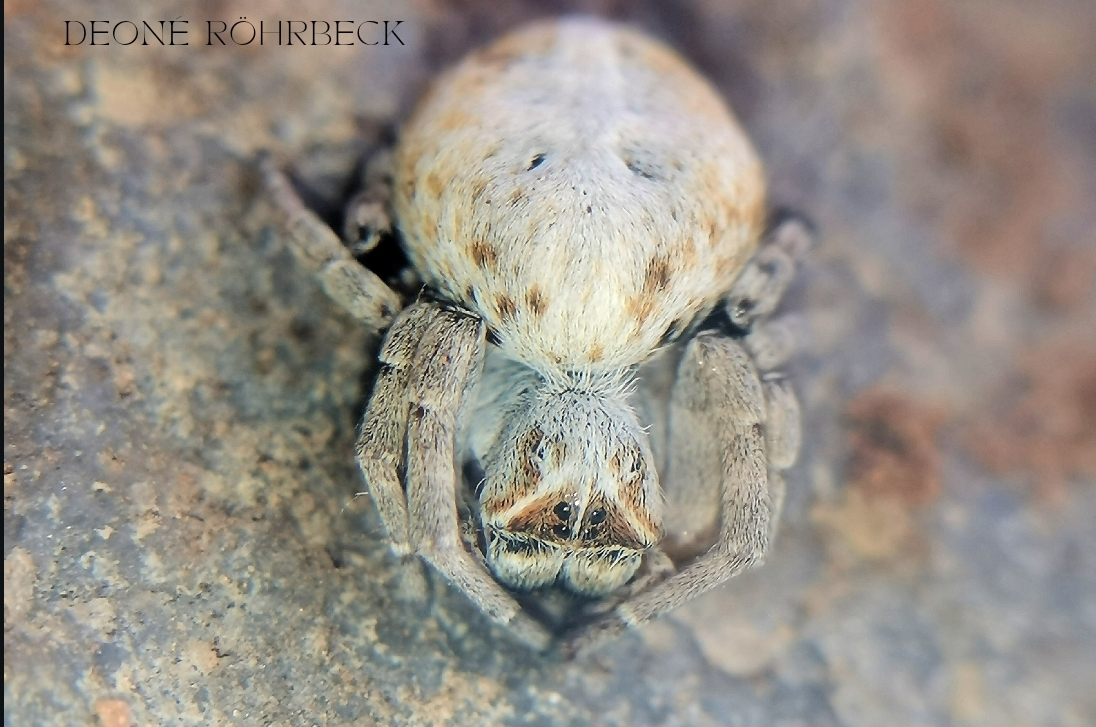
female S. tentoriicola

As of September 2025 it contains about twenty species:

- Stegodyphus africanus (Blackwall, 1866) – Africa
- Stegodyphus bicolor (O. Pickard-Cambridge, 1869) – Southern Africa
- Stegodyphus dufouri (Audouin, 1826) – North, West Africa
- Stegodyphus dumicola Pocock, 1898 – Central, Southern Africa
- Stegodyphus hildebrandti (Karsch, 1878) – Central, East Africa, Zanzibar
- Stegodyphus lineatus (Latreille, 1817) (type) – Southern Europe, North Africa to Tajikistan
- Stegodyphus lineifrons Pocock, 1898 – East Africa
- Stegodyphus manaus Kraus & Kraus, 1992 – Brazil
- Stegodyphus manicatus Simon, 1876 – North, West Africa
- Stegodyphus mimosarum Pavesi, 1883 – Africa, Madagascar
- Stegodyphus mirandus Pocock, 1899 – India
- Stegodyphus nathistmus Kraus & Kraus, 1989 – Morocco to Yemen
- Stegodyphus pacificus Pocock, 1900 – Jordan, Iran, Pakistan, India
- Stegodyphus sabulosus Tullgren, 1910 – East, Southern Africa
- Stegodyphus sarasinorum Karsch, 1892 – India, Sri Lanka, Nepal, Myanmar
- Stegodyphus simplicifrons Simon, 1906 – Madagascar
- Stegodyphus tentoriicola Purcell, 1904 – South Africa
- Stegodyphus tibialis (O. Pickard-Cambridge, 1869) – India, Myanmar, Thailand, China
- Stegodyphus tingelin Kraus & Kraus, 1989 – Cameroon
