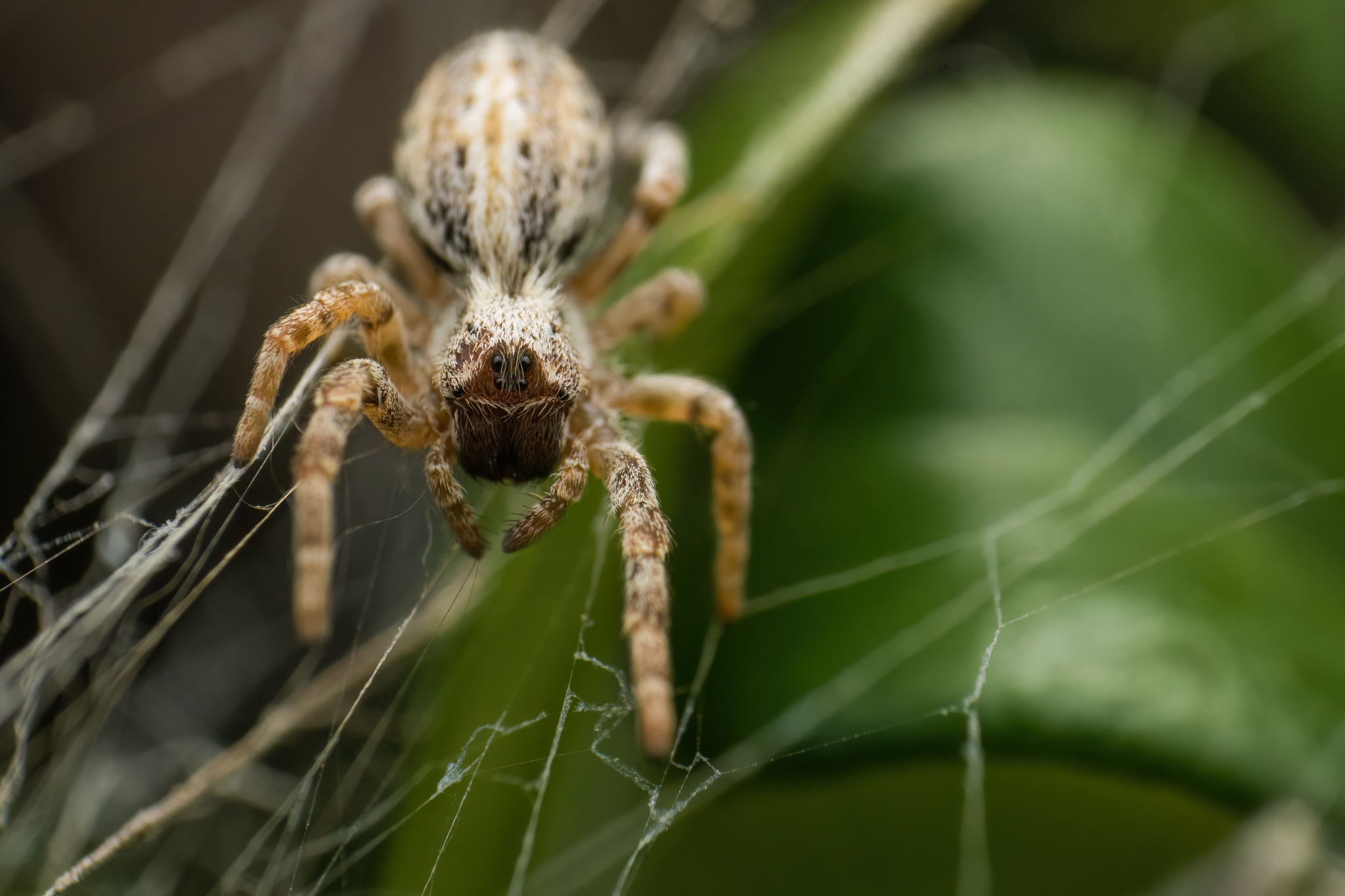
- From Thazhambur, Tamil Nadu, India

Scientific classification
- Kingdom: Animalia
- Phylum: Arthropoda
- Subphylum: Chelicerata
- Class: Arachnida
- Order: Araneae
- Infraorder: Araneomorphae
- Family: Eresidae
- Genus: Stegodyphus
- Species: S. sarasinorum

Binomial name
- Stegodyphus sarasinorum Karsch, 1892

= Stegodyphus sarasinorum =

Indian cooperative spider

Species of arachnid

Stegodyphus sarasinorum, also known as the Indian cooperative spider, is a species of velvet spider of the family Eresidae. It is native to India, Sri Lanka, Nepal, and Myanmar. This spider is a social spider that exhibits communal predation and feeding, where individuals live in large cooperatively built colonies with a nest or retreat constructed of silk woven using leaves, twigs, and food carcasses, and a sheet web for prey capture.

Individual S. sarasinorum spiders that have attacked prey once are more likely to attack prey again, independent of their body size or hunger level. Stegodyphus is the only genus of the family Eresidae that is arboreal, not terrestrial.

== Description ==
Stegodyphus sarasinorum, like most Eresids, are short, stout spiders lined with several fine hairs. These fine hairs give the spiders an ash-colored appearance. The dorsal side of the abdomen is marked with three longitudinal white stripes and six pairs of dots, which are part of the spider's patterning. There are two irregular surfaces containing the six spinnerets encased in a structure called the cribellum. Unlike most spiders, S. sarasinorum does not have a well defined cephalic groove. The arrangement of the eight eyes consisted of two rows of four and two in front and the other rows facing the side to allow for the wider range of vision. Their modified mandibles, known as chelicerae, are black in color and the claws are curved for defense on the sides of the body.

== Population structure ==
Within the genus Stegodyphus, 20 species were assigned according to social status, distribution range, and phenotypic expression of male and female reproduction characteristics. Three of the social spider species are Stegodyphus mimosarum, Stegodyphus africanus, and Stegodyphus sarasinosum. S. sarasinorum is a social spider, hence the populations have high levels of inbreeding and relatedness. The low rates of dispersal and high turnover rates result in low gene flow and lack of speciation. Accordingly, social spiders are thought to likely be evolutionary dead ends especially with their practice of obligate group living.

The colonies are highly dependent on females, and they have highly skewed sex ratios in favor of females. For every female, there are 0.15 to 0.28 males.

== Habitat and distribution ==
Stegodyphus sarasinorum is native to south and southeast Asia, predominantly in the countries of India, Sri Lanka, Nepal, and Myanmar. One of the preferred places of S. sarasinorum is the prickly pear bush, because it serves as a strong support for their silken dwellings and webs. In some cases, the bushes are covered by these spiders’ dwellings to the extent that the leaves are not visible. These spiders are more abundant on bushes, trees, and fences where they can easily construct their webs on the sturdy surface. S. sarasinorum likes building nests in shaded areas which is an advantage for catching prey. They also live along rivers, especially when prey abundance is considerably higher near sources of water. S. sarasinorum prefers to build their nests over thick continuous spreads of vegetation, using a fence or bridge for support.

=== Habitat niche ===
Social Stegodyphus sp. are usually found in locations of complex vegetation structure and reduced habitat niches as compared to solitary spiders. High vegetation productivity is correlated to higher insect prey biomass, therefore distribution patterns of these spiders is based on the availability of web building spaces and abundance of insect prey for them to thrive. Sturdier vegetation is necessary for nest building especially since Stegodyphus spiders tend to stay in the same spot. The environmental conditions are important cues for group living that prevent a loss of fitness as a result of high resource competition. Their tendency to engage in group living and cooperative breeding evolved due to high predation pressure and the ample prey availability makes permanent sociality an evolutionarily stable strategy.

== Home range and territoriality ==
=== Dispersal ===
Stegodyphus sarasinorum is largely dependent on communal living, and they disperse at a lower rate compared to most spiders. There are two main dispersal strategies that occur which are group dispersal to form nearby satellite colonies or solitary dispersal when a mated female leaves her natal colony and starts her own new independent colony. Colonies with more abundant food source were found to be more likely to disperse into satellite colonies, whereas less feed colonies tend to remain with their natal colonies. Solitary dispersers also face more of a predation risk and their fitness too does not improve when they leave their original colonies. One strategy used by group dispersers is capturing webs to improve feeding opportunities and increase space, however the webs can be disturbed by wind, rain, or other nearby animals.

Stegodyphus sarasinorum individuals do migrate between nearby colonies and they are usually accepted by the new colony. Immatures have been observed to use ballooning to disperse; however, the significance is not well known. The cooperative nature of these spiders is seen even in the way that they aggregate together as a group even when they are removed from their nest. There are no separate castes or a set hierarchy in the population structure of S. sarasinorum, and they thrive when they live communally.

=== Colony growth ===
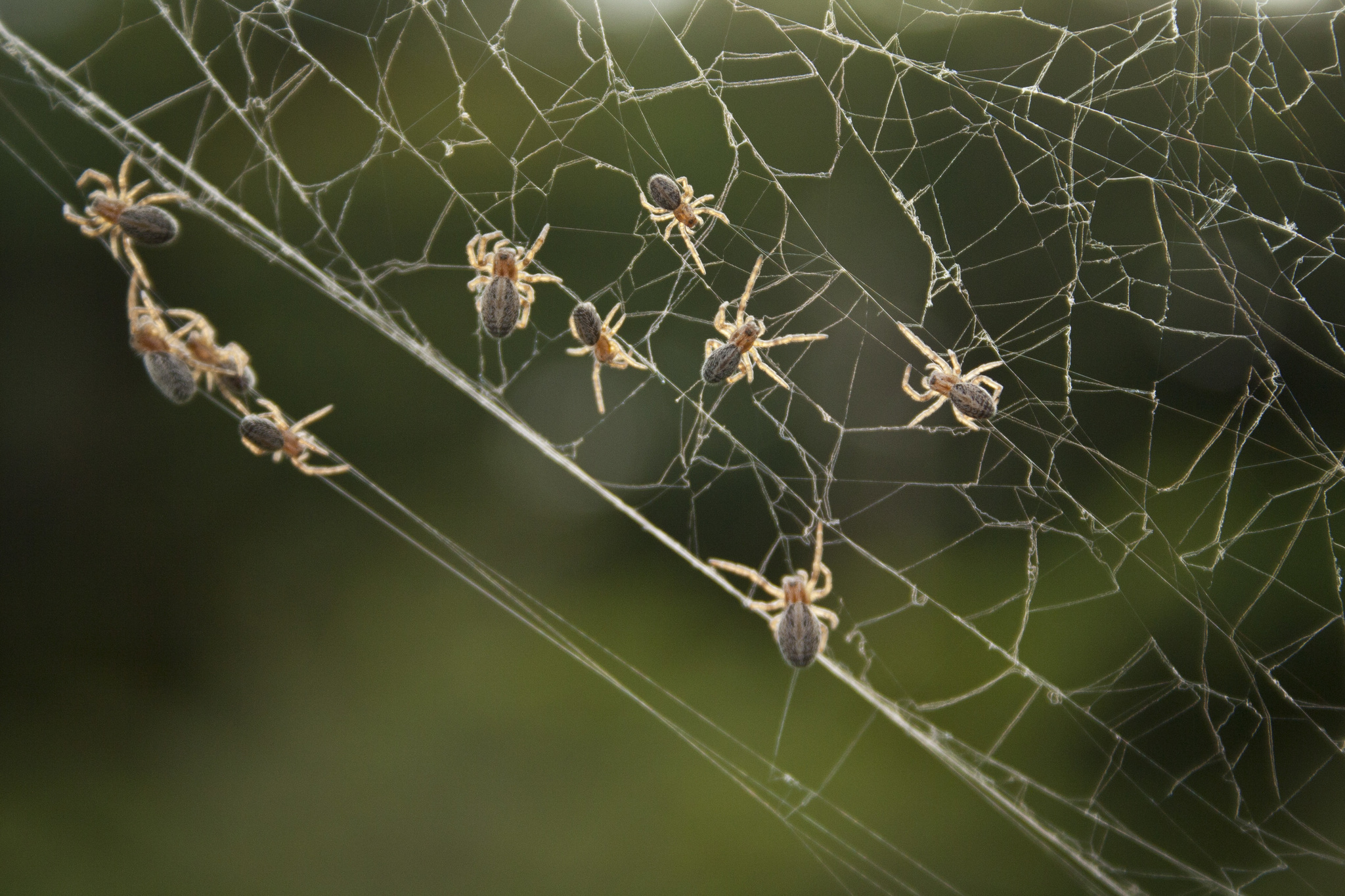
S. sarasinorum colonly from Bengaluru, Karnataka, India

The growth in a Stegodyphus colony depends almost solely on reproduction over later generations, and abundant food supply too does not increase colony size, rather it results in the creation of more colonies in the vicinity. In terms of dispersal, it is rare for spiders to immigrate into an already established colony because of the colony distribution and communal living system. Intermediate sized females are the most likely to move out to start a new colony, while the larger females prefer to stay in their own colony. As a consequence of group size, larger nests have spiders of a lower mean weight. In the smaller groups, spiders are generally even more cooperative and less competitive since they depend on each other more, and have the common interests of feeding and avoiding predators. Spider size at sexual maturity too varies with food availability and the mature females in large colonies are almost always smaller than females in a small colony. Communal feeding allows for a reliable and consistent amount of prey and though each spider eats less in large groups, this system is more beneficial since solitary hunting is too risky. Also, in colony living and cooperative breeding, the benefits outweigh the costs because higher fitness and survival comes from group living and there are more surrounding individuals to care for offspring as opposed to in personal reproduction.

== Prey capture ==
Stegodyphus sarasinorum is known to strategically position their webs in mostly shady areas. Consequently, they almost always have an ample food source as they are able to lure in a variety of insects. Sensing the vibrations of struggle from caught insects, the spiders scurry over to pull and drag the prey back to their nest. At times, disentangling prey can damage the webs, and following capture, female workers get back to filling in any gaps with new threads. Once the prey is brought to the nest, the spiders hold onto some part of the prey pulling it towards themselves, exhibiting selfish behavior. Spiders have been observed to grab onto the prey's leg and move away into an area when none of the spiders can see it eating first. Otherwise, all the individuals in the nest eat together, breaking away different portions to jointly divide the meal. Communal feeding occurs even with spiders who may not have taken part in the prey capture. Since these are social spiders, and therefore not very skilled in carefully securing prey without disturbing the web, they typically follow the drag, pull, bite technique in obtaining prey.

=== Varying behavioral response ===
In S. sarasinorum, prey capture is influenced by various personality types that tend to consistently attack certain species over others. These spiders participated more when attacking grasshoppers more than bees and in order to properly capture and subdue the bees, spiders required better task specialization. In the communal capture of prey, individuals take on separate roles such as leading the attack, following attacks, and some avoid participation as well. Participation in prey capture is modulated by both the prey species and individual personality types that dictate extent of involvement.

=== Kleptoparasitism ===
Kleptoparasitism refers to animals stealing nest material or prey from nearby individuals and social spiders’ foraging behaviors increase the prevalence of such kleptoparasitism from other insects. Kleptoparasitic ants rely on a source of high-quality food and when they observe noticeable hunting and food carrying habits, they determine their potential targets. Because web-building spiders such as Stegodyphus sarasinorum are quite sedentary organisms that take a long time to capture and consume prey, these spiders are a prime target of kleptoparasitic ants. Ants tend to destroy the web of S. sarasinorum and have been observed to feed on remains of prey in the web as well. S. sarasinorum does not alter its prey capture technique or prey ingestion rates based on the presence of kleptoparasites, however invasion of their webs reduces the web building capacity and web strength with repeated weaving.

== Diet ==
Stegodyphus sarasinorum eats many types of prey such as bees, mosquitoes, crickets, beetles, butterflies, and moths that get caught in the webs. Some of the common orders of insects consumed by this spider are Coleoptera, Orthoptera, Hymenoptera, Hemiptera, and Isoptera, and Coleoptera and Orthoptera tend to be the most preferred. This species focuses more on consuming all available prey and is not especially choosy about specific prey types. S. sarasinorum is known to capture and eat prey up to 50 mm in size, much larger than their own 7.5 mm bodies. As spiderlings, they consume the liquid regurgitated by their mothers.

== Webs ==
The web of S. sarasinorum is made up of longitudinal and zig-zag lines and the thickness and use of threads depending on the purpose of that section. The foundational line is jointly made by six or seven spiders moving back and forth on the threads in order to thicken that region. When the warp lines are laid, there are bundles of few threads that appear to be thin yet are strong enough for their purpose. In the weaving process, multiple spiders come together and start spinning threads in different regions of the web and lay down sticky connecting threads. S. sarasinorum uses the hind pair of legs, rubbing against spinnerets and moving quickly across the web to lay out the threads in an efficient fashion. The sticky lines are very elastic and this allows the spiders to create large and effective webs. As the main goal is to create a large net, not much precision or symmetry is required. S. sarasinorum is well known for the collaborative nature of web construction with little idleness and each spider moves to an incomplete section to finish the task. Usually webs are built within two to three hours in the evening and following that, spiders return to their next location and rest till their active hours in the night. When energy needs increase, S. sarasinorum either focuses more on capturing large sized insects or they more quickly immobilize their prey to improve their efficiency. For example, it is better for them to invest energy in capturing grasshoppers over beetles since they provide more food for the larger community in the nest. The web silk of S. sarasinorum has been found to have a significantly high non-enzymatic antioxidant potential.

=== Web repair ===
These spiders have the ability to repair the nest since they rarely find the need to fully rebuild the threads. Most of the time, the first spider to emerge from the nest after rest observes the web and checks for any damage, and then the active female workers are responsible for the repair work. The males do little work with web building, especially after reaching maturity when they invest all their time and energy into courtship. During winter, these spiders thicken the nest walls and any holes are skillfully closed to better protect themselves from rain and wind.

== Mating ==
Breeding season occurs in the spring between January and April for S. sarasinorum. The courtship rituals may involve the male chasing after the female even through narrow passages to attract the female. When the female resents the approach, she steps aside or runs away, but does not respond with aggression like many other spider species do. If she allows the male to be close, there is a mating period of usually 3–4 minutes when the male rubs his pedipalps against the female's genital pore.

Gravid females are much larger and slower than normal females, and they do not take part in web building. Since they are not active enough to capture prey by themselves, other members of the colony drag prey into the nest for the gravid females to feed. They use their hind legs to groom the dorsal part of their abdomen and groom their appendages against each other in a motion called toilet movements. Their main tasks are construction of 2 to 4 brood chambers for their young during breeding season and initiating new colony formation when they disperse to create new breeding nests nearby. Gravid females also guard the egg sac, mostly because they rely on only one breeding season in their lifetime. The 10 stages of cocoon spinning are: construction of the platform, making the receiving valve, rest, oviposition, concealing the egg mass, covering valve, removal of some supporting threads, cribellar silk, separation of the cocoon, and transportation.

== Life cycle ==
Stegodyphus sarasinorum is a semelparous species and females invest all their time and resources into a single reproduction event. Eggs are typically laid in a lenticular cocoon packed in silk, with the maximum number of cocoons being made in the month of February. A singular egg sac can contain between 350 and 550 eggs, and webs enclosing them are built in a more compact and sturdy fashion. The 6 mm cocoons are white colored and the females attach them to the side walls of the nest. 13 to 15 days later, the juveniles tear open the cocoon walls and emerge, moving to settle on their mother's back. The young are generally round and pink, and they do not intake food until after 2-3 molts when they begin to get involved in web construction. As the young develop more, adults in the nest tend to desert the nest else they starve to death with the selfish feeding of the juveniles.

== Parental care ==
Around 4 to 5 weeks after the females lay their eggs, they open the egg sac and the spiderlings stay within the maternal webs. Unlike most spiders, females do not capture prey for their young, nor do the juveniles catch or eat prey prior to their mother's death. Mothers feed their juveniles through regurgitation which involves liquefaction of her internal organs to create material that will increase the fitness of her young. Once her ability to liquefy internal organs is exhausted, the young climb onto her body and consume fluid from her body in a practice called matriphagy and within 3 to 4 hours, the mother's exoskeleton can be extracted from the webs. After spending a few more weeks in the maternal web, spiderlings feed on trapped insects and later migrate to build a new web.

== Social behavior ==
Stegodyphus sarasinorum is a social spider, so web building and feeding are all communal practices, depending on each other for survival. An interesting aspect of S. sarasinorum behavior is antagonism. The dwarfed males thrive only when they stay agile and cunning and even between sexes there is lots of selfish behavior. Females attack the males and even bite off their legs in the process of courtship to reduce their fitness levels. Due to this evolutionary struggle, in related families like Araneidae, this antagonism has resulted in mental and physical shortcomings like dwarfism, dull color, and deformities.

=== Task differentiation ===
Sociality in spiders tends to be present even without reproductive division of labor and generational overlap. Similar to the social species Anelosimus eximius, Stegodyphus species exhibit behavioral asymmetry, a trait implying convergent evolution. In experiments examining the effect of size on various tasks within the colony, it was observed that individuals chose to continuously take on the same role related to prey attack or web maintenance irrespective of their size. It is likely that social spiders that are distantly related and have evolved independently of each other have task differentiation unrelated to their size or hunger state.

== Protective behavior ==
The main protection for S. sarasinorum is the silken nest that they jointly construct to shelter themselves and reduce the risk of predation. It is more difficult for predators to detect these spiders when they are within their nest especially when their retreats are covered with leaves and the swarming tendency of these spiders benefits them as well. These nests protect them to some extent from wind and rain, but it does not help them when temperatures are low.

The nests constructed by the Stegodyphus genus are the primary means of protection from predators and environmental stressors such as wind and fire as well. Because the nests are so dense and compact, they serve as shields to protect from predators and maintain moisture within the living area. Leaving the nests is highly risky because they become vulnerable to predator attack and they face fitness costs from solar radiation and rains during solitary hunting.

== Commensalism ==
Uloborus ferokus has been found to be a commensal of Stegodyphus sarasinorum and has never been observed without association with its host. The sticky webs of S. sarasinorum serve as a site where the primary orbs of U. ferokus can attach. Another advantage for the commensals is that staying in the web provides them with access to the small insects that get lodged in the threads. The webs also prevent Idris, an egg parasite, from damaging the cocoons of U. ferokus.

== Bites ==
Stegodyphus sarasinorum has not been observed to cause any harm to humans or vertebrate animals.
