= Attus =

Genus of arachnids (junior synonym of Salticus)

Attus is a taxon name that is now considered a junior synonym of Salticus. In the early 19th century, most jumping spiders were grouped together as a single genus under the name Attus.

The genus was originally described in 1805 by Charles Walckenaer, only a year after Pierre Latreille described the first jumping spider genus (or subgenus), Salticus. Walckenaer, ignoring Latreille, placed all of the spiders assigned to Salticus into his new genus, Attus, with the exception of Aranea cinnaberinus, which he placed into Eresus. No further actions were taken regarding these genera until 1810, when Latreille moved Attus scenicus back to Salticus by declaring it as the type species for the genus.

Over the course of the 19th century, numerous new genera were split off of Attus, reducing the number of species assigned to the genus considerably. In 1832, Nicholas Marcellus Hentz detached the genera Lyssomanes, Synemosyna, and Epiblemum from Attus. In 1833, Carl Sundevall moved numerous species from Attus to Salticus. From 1833 to 1850, Carl Ludwig Koch created 24 new jumping spider genera, most of which were detached from Attus.

Due to the genus's unclear definition, it was often used as a provisional classification for any jumping spiders that could not otherwise be assigned to a genus. In 1955, Pierre Bonnet declared Attus to be a junior synonym of Salticus, since Walckenaer did not differentiate Attus from Salticus and the latter has priority as an older name.
