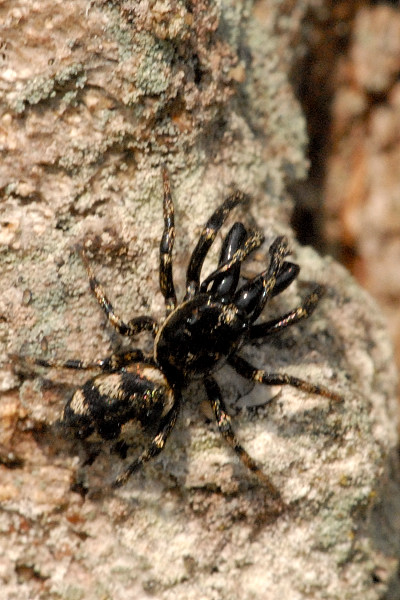
- from Belgium

Scientific classification
- Kingdom: Animalia
- Phylum: Arthropoda
- Subphylum: Chelicerata
- Class: Arachnida
- Order: Araneae
- Infraorder: Araneomorphae
- Family: Salticidae
- Genus: Salticus
- Species: S. zebraneus

Binomial name
- Salticus zebraneus (C. L. Koch, 1837)

Synonyms
- Aranea olearii Scopoli, 1763; Calliethera zebranea C. L. Koch, 1837; Calliethera varia C. L. Koch, 1837; Calliethera tenera C. L. Koch, 1846; Callietherus simulatus Simon, 1868; Callietherus tenerus Simon, 1868; Salticus affinitatus O. Pickard-Cambridge, 1871; Salticus olearii (Scopoli, 1763)

= Salticus zebraneus =

Species of jumping spider

Salticus zebraneus is a species of jumping spider in the family Salticidae. Originally described by Carl Ludwig Koch in 1837 as Calliethera zebranea, it is found across Europe, Turkey, Russia (European part and Caucasus), and Iran.

== Distribution ==
S. zebraneus has been recorded from Europe, Turkey, Russia (including European Russia and the Caucasus region), and Iran. In Britain, it is generally rare but has been recorded from a number of localities in south-east England, where it is mainly found on the trunks of pine trees, sometimes in abundance.

== Habitat ==
The species is found on tall plants and bushes and on trees, particularly conifers. In Britain, it shows a preference for pine tree trunks.

== Description ==
Variations from CL Koch (1846)

male

female

male

female

female

Salticus zebraneus is a small jumping spider with females measuring 3–4 mm and males 3-3.5 mm in body length (including chelicerae). It is similar in appearance to Salticus scenicus, but is generally smaller and has less noticeable white stripes - sometimes displaying only a sprinkling of white hairs.

The species can be distinguished from related species by its distinctive epigyne in females and the relatively large tibial apophysis of the male palp, which is much larger than that found in Salticus cingulatus. The spade-like apophysis should not be confused with that of Sitticus pubescens.

Adults reach maturity during the summer months.
