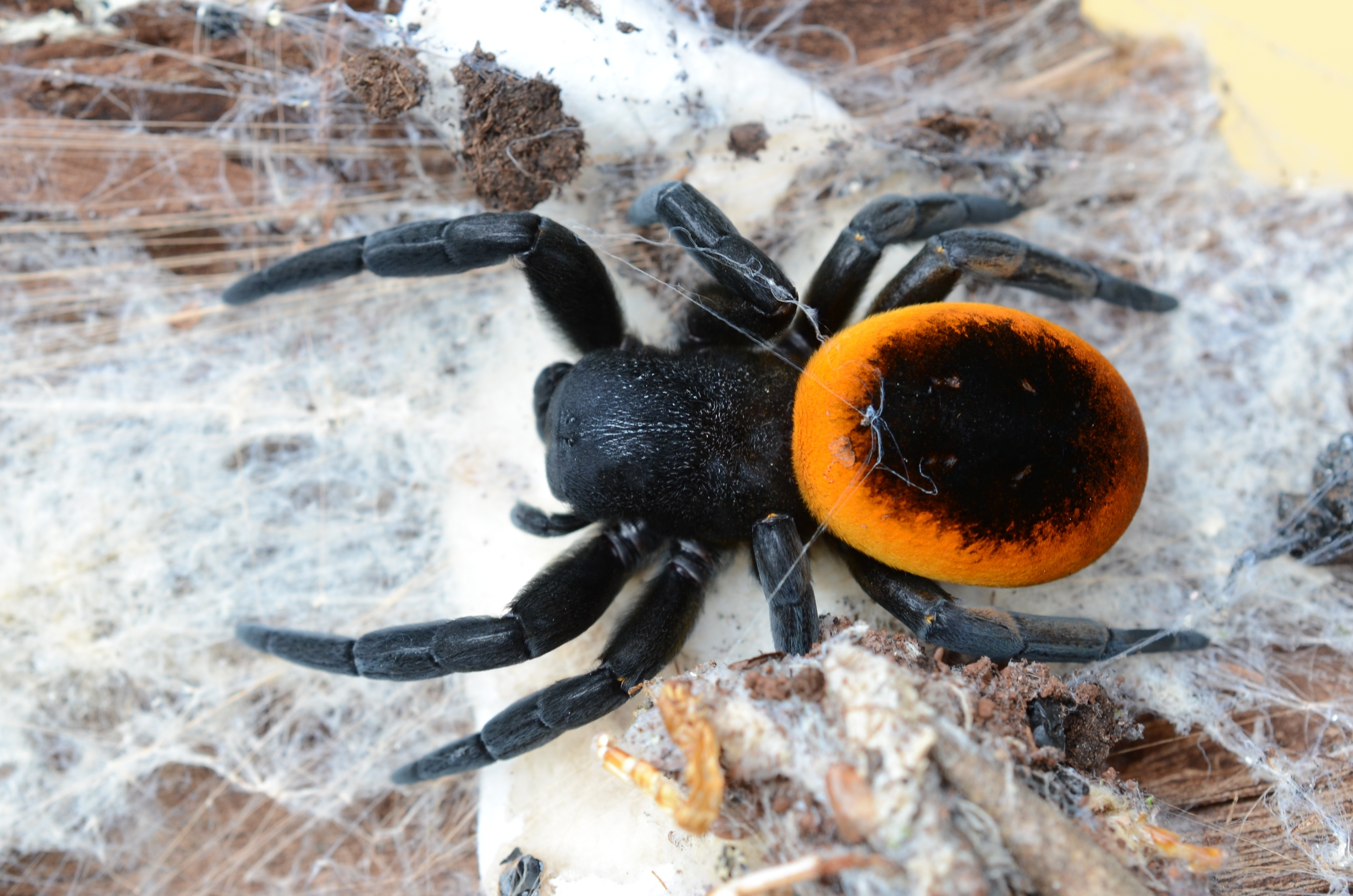

Scientific classification
- Kingdom: Animalia
- Phylum: Arthropoda
- Subphylum: Chelicerata
- Class: Arachnida
- Order: Araneae
- Infraorder: Araneomorphae
- Family: Eresidae
- Genus: Eresus
- Species: E. walckenaeri

Binomial name
- Eresus walckenaeri Brullé, 1832

Synonyms
- List Eresus walckenaer Eresus audouin Eresus theis Eresus ctenizoides Eresus luridus Eresus puniceus Eresus pruinosus Eresus siculus Erythrophora punicea

= Eresus walckenaeri =

Species of spider

Eresus walckenaerius is a species of ladybird spider from the eastern Mediterranean.

== Description ==
While males are very similar to those of Eresus sandaliatus or Eresus kollari the females are up to 4 cm long. The females often have a red band on their opisthosoma. Adult males can be found from April to June.

== Habits ==
Their strikingly pink webs are built below rocks. One egg sac contains several hundred eggs, and spiderlings seem to disperse much more than other Eresus species (using ballooning), so that they are not found in large clusters.

== Distribution ==
This species is found on the southern Balkans, in southern Italy, in Turkey and on islands of the Aegean Sea.

== Name ==
The species name is in honor of Charles Athanase Walckenaer.

== Subspecies ==
Eresus walckenaeri moerens C. L. Koch, 1846 (Afghanistan)
