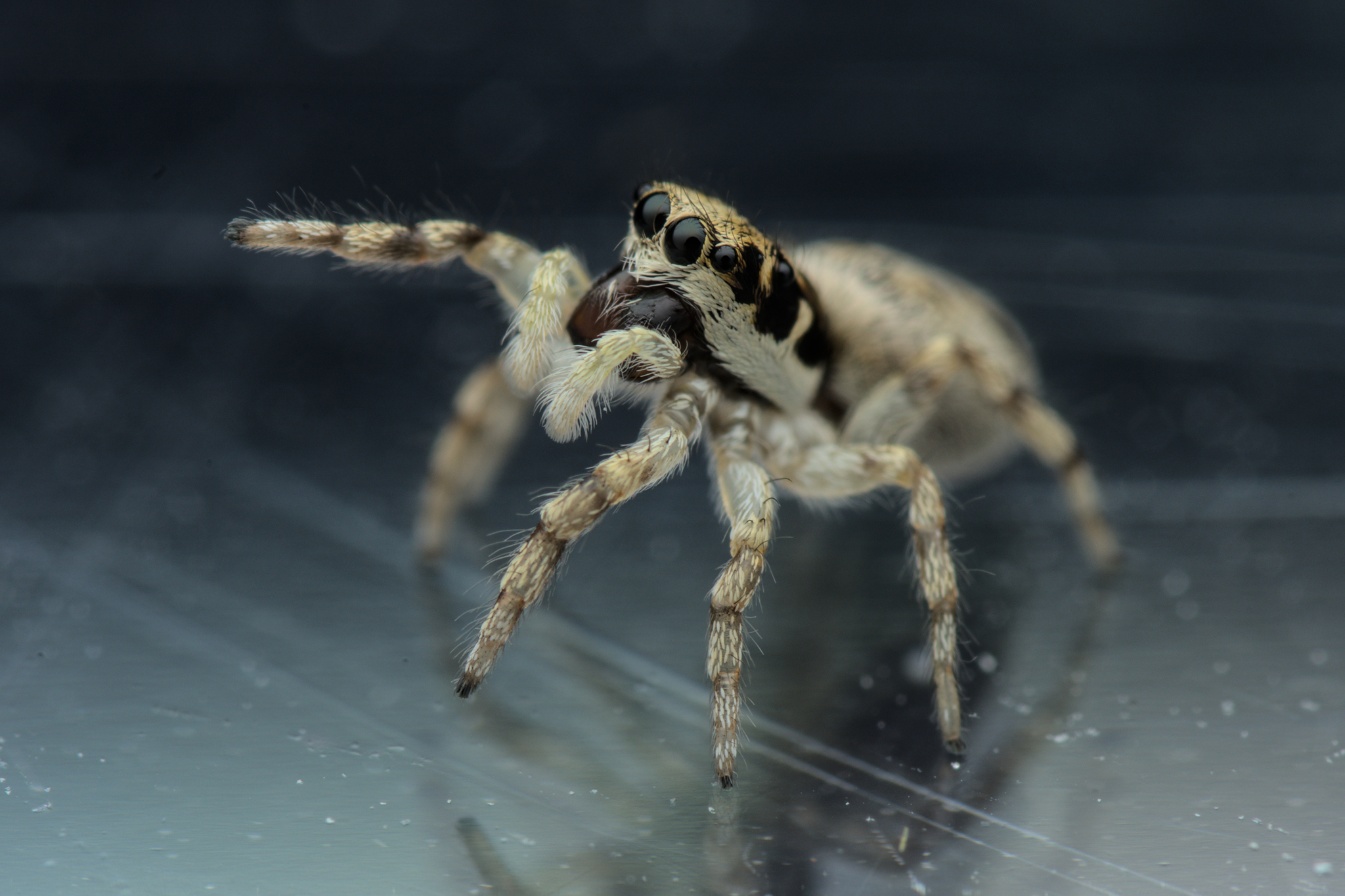
- from France

Scientific classification
- Kingdom: Animalia
- Phylum: Arthropoda
- Subphylum: Chelicerata
- Class: Arachnida
- Order: Araneae
- Infraorder: Araneomorphae
- Family: Salticidae
- Genus: Salticus
- Species: S. mutabilis

Binomial name
- Salticus mutabilis Lucas, 1846

Synonyms
- Callietherus zebraneus Simon, 1868; Callitherus tenerus Simon, 1868; Marpissa civilis Holmberg, 1876

= Salticus mutabilis =

Species of jumping spider

Salticus mutabilis is a species of jumping spider in the family Salticidae. It has a wide distribution across Macaronesia, Europe, North Africa, Turkey, and the Caucasus, and has been introduced to Argentina.

== Distribution ==
S. mutabilis is widely distributed across the Mediterranean region and Europe, extending from the Macaronesian islands in the west to the Caucasus in the east. The species is found throughout much of Europe, including France, Germany, Italy, and Sicily, where historical records show it replacing the closely related Salticus scenicus. It also occurs in North Africa and Turkey. The species has been introduced to Argentina, where it was first recorded in the 19th century.

== Description ==
Salticus mutabilis shows considerable sexual dimorphism and variation in coloration patterns.

=== Male ===
Males measure 4-4.75 mm in body length. The cephalothorax (front body section) is black with white borders and three white spots. The abdomen is white with a dark median band bordered by black on each side. The legs are yellow with dark rings, and the chelicerae (mouthparts) are two-toothed.

The male's cephalothorax is shorter and narrower than in the related Salticus scenicus, with a squarely cut front edge. The anterior eyes form a more pronounced projection when viewed from above. The cephalothorax is black, bordered posteriorly with a bright white line and decorated with three white spots - one on the front border and two in the middle of the thorax, which are elongated and parallel.

=== Female ===
Females are larger than males, measuring up to 6 mm in body length. The female's cephalothorax is often covered with tawny down that conceals the border and two central spots.

The female's abdomen shows considerable variation and can appear in several forms. In one variety, the median band is interrupted at the second constriction and is completely bordered by a black line forming a figure-8 pattern with a greyish center. In another form, the median band is narrow and bright yellow, terminating in a point at the front and bordered by a black line resembling an accent mark or spear point. A third variety shows the abdomen entirely white with a very pale tawny median band effaced at the constricted areas, appearing to be replaced by three spots - the first being an arc and the other two being somewhat darkened triangles at their angles.

== Habitat ==
The species is commonly found in various European habitats and has been observed to live in a similar manner to Salticus scenicus in areas where both species occur.

== Taxonomy ==
Salticus mutabilis was first described by Lucas in 1846. The species has a complex taxonomic history with several synonyms, including Callietherus zebraneus and Callitherus tenerus, both described by Simon in 1868, and Marpissa civilis described by Holmberg in 1876.
