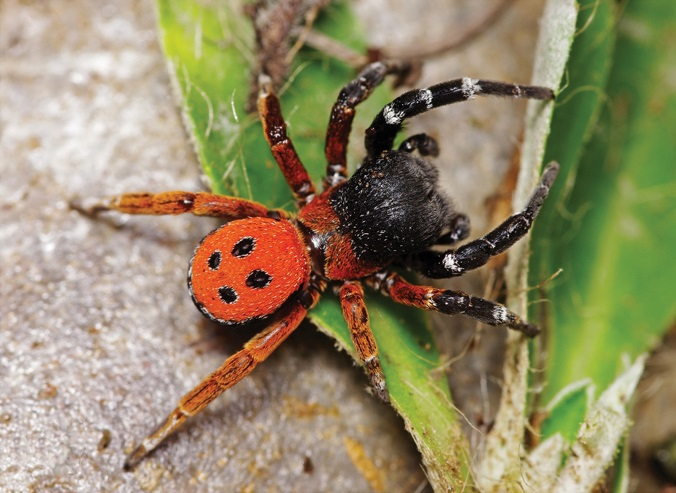

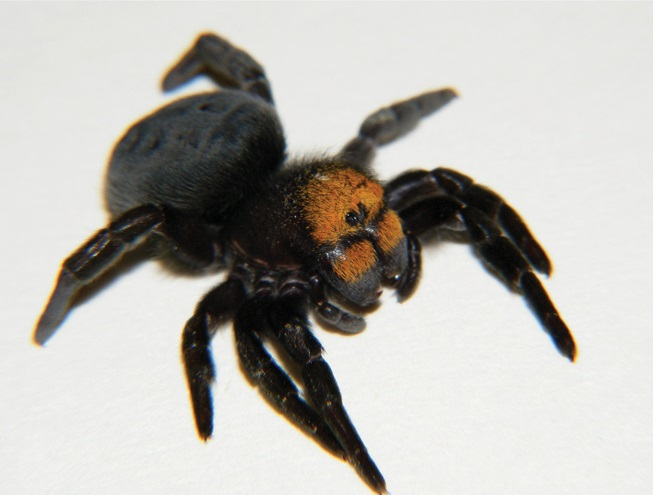
- Male (top) and female

Scientific classification
- Kingdom: Animalia
- Phylum: Arthropoda
- Subphylum: Chelicerata
- Class: Arachnida
- Order: Araneae
- Infraorder: Araneomorphae
- Family: Eresidae
- Genus: Eresus
- Species: E. moravicus

Binomial name
- Eresus moravicus Řezáč, 2008

= Eresus moravicus =

Species of spider

Eresus moravicus is a spider species in the family Eresidae found in Austria, Hungary, Czechia, Serbia, Slovakia, Kazakhstan, and Albania., found mainly in rocky steppe habitats. It is named after the eastern part of the Czech Republic, Moravia, which is where the type species was found. E. moravicus is one of the three species into which Eresus cinnaberinus or Eresus niger has been divided.

== Description ==
This is the largest Eresus species found in Central Europe, males are black and red. the first two legs are black, with the last two being red. The opisthosoma is red with the carapace being black. While the females are mostly black, except with orange hairs on the part of the prosoma.

== Identification ==
E. moravicus can be distinguished from the other two species by the red hind legs in males and the orange hairs on prosoma in females, among other features. To identify them from the Mediterranean species which also share this trait, it is species-specific. For E. ruficapilus, you can tell them apart by the prosoma which is tapered backward, E. fulvous, have a greater size and have yellow hairs that are longer. Covering most of the entire form of the cheliceral segments. They also have a less lobed spermatheca. E. ignicomis is larger and the coverage of orange hairs is less consistent, usually just spotting. E. tricolor differ by the presence of white spots on the opisthosoma.
