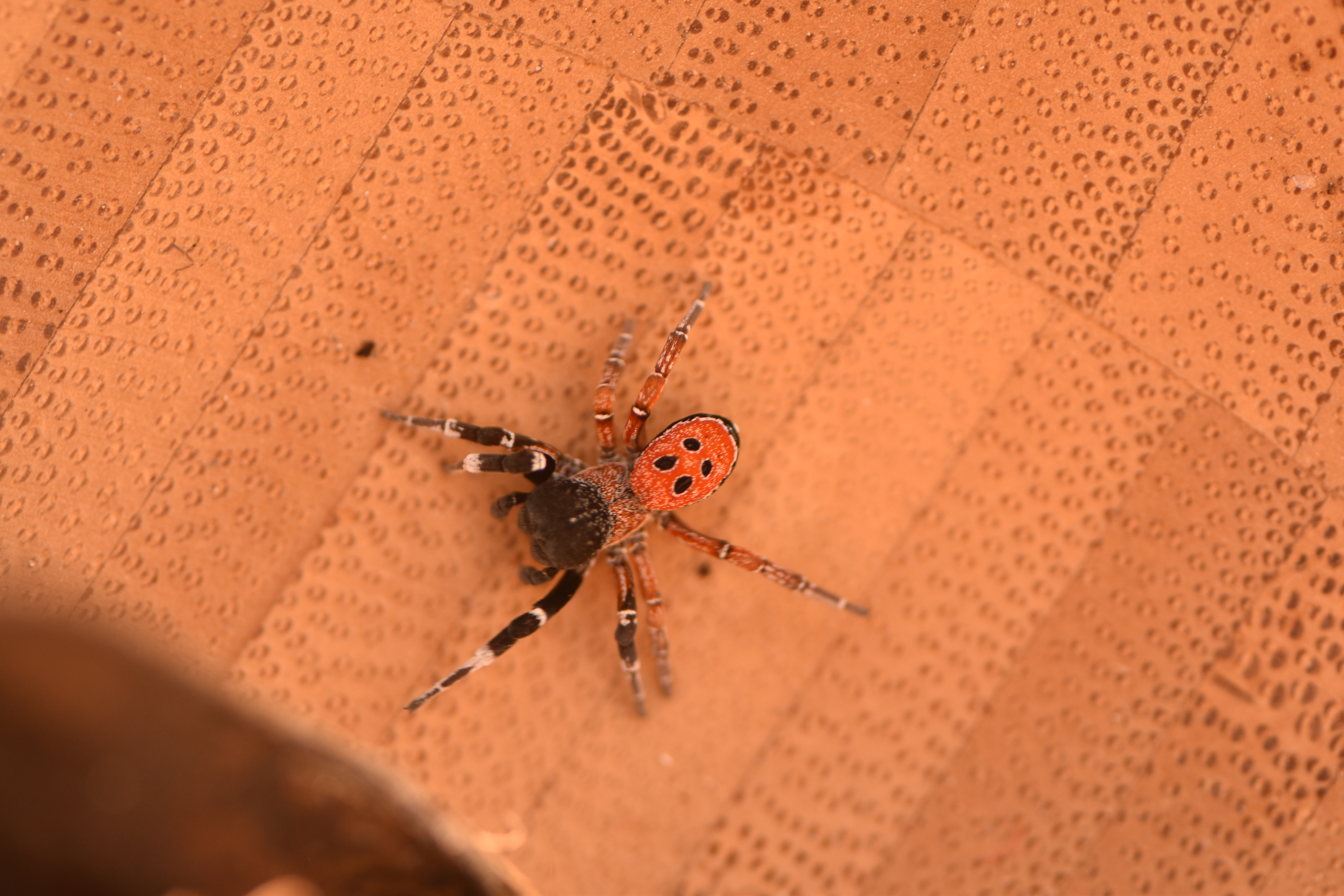

Scientific classification
- Kingdom: Animalia
- Phylum: Arthropoda
- Subphylum: Chelicerata
- Class: Arachnida
- Order: Araneae
- Infraorder: Araneomorphae
- Family: Eresidae
- Genus: Eresus
- Species: E. solitarius

Binomial name
- Eresus solitarius Simon, 1873

= Eresus solitarius =

Species of spider

Eresus solitarius is a spider species in the family Eresidae. It is found in the Mediterranean Basin.
