= Eresus lavrosiae =

Scientific classification
- Kingdom: Animalia
- Phylum: Arthropoda
- Subphylum: Chelicerata
- Class: Arachnida
- Order: Araneae
- Infraorder: Araneomorphae
- Family: Eresidae
- Genus: Eresus
- Species: E. lavrosiae

Binomial name
- Eresus lavrosiae Mcheidze, 1997

Species of spider

Eresus lavrosiae is a spider species found in Georgia.
