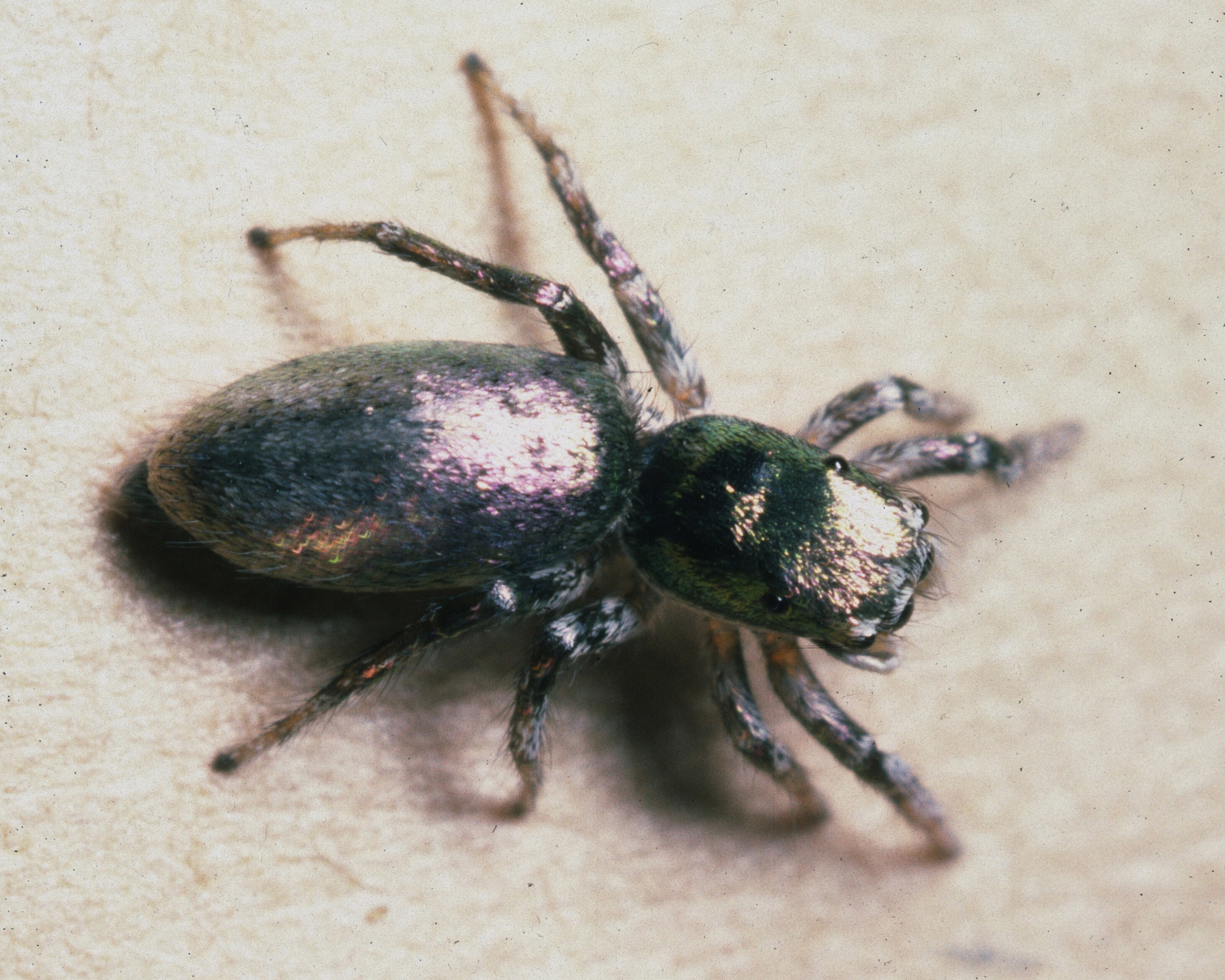
- Female in California

Scientific classification
- Kingdom: Animalia
- Phylum: Arthropoda
- Subphylum: Chelicerata
- Class: Arachnida
- Order: Araneae
- Infraorder: Araneomorphae
- Family: Salticidae
- Genus: Salticus
- Species: S. peckhamae

Binomial name
- Salticus peckhamae (Cockerell, 1897)

= Salticus peckhamae =

Species of spider

Salticus peckhamae is a species of jumping spider. It is found in the United States. This species was first described by Theodore Dru Alison Cockerell in 1897 and originally named Icius peckhamae in honor of arachnologist Elizabeth Peckham.
