= Eresus sedilloti =

Scientific classification
- Kingdom: Animalia
- Phylum: Arthropoda
- Subphylum: Chelicerata
- Class: Arachnida
- Order: Araneae
- Infraorder: Araneomorphae
- Family: Eresidae
- Genus: Eresus
- Species: E. sedilloti

Binomial name
- Eresus sedilloti Simon, 1881

Species of spider

Eresus sedilloti is a spider species found in Portugal and Spain.

It was first described in 1881 by Eugène Simon, who named it in honour of the collector and entomologist Maurice Sédillot (1849-1933).
