= Eresus robustus =

Scientific classification
- Kingdom: Animalia
- Phylum: Arthropoda
- Subphylum: Chelicerata
- Class: Arachnida
- Order: Araneae
- Infraorder: Araneomorphae
- Family: Eresidae
- Genus: Eresus
- Species: E. robustus

Binomial name
- Eresus robustus Franganillo, 1918

Species of spider

Eresus robustus is a spider species found in Spain.
