= Eresus rubrocephalus =

Scientific classification
- Kingdom: Animalia
- Phylum: Arthropoda
- Subphylum: Chelicerata
- Class: Arachnida
- Order: Araneae
- Infraorder: Araneomorphae
- Family: Eresidae
- Genus: Eresus
- Species: E. rubrocephalus

Binomial name
- Eresus rubrocephalus Gál, 2025

Species of spider

Eresus rubrocephalus is species of spider found in Morocco. It was first described in 2025.

== Taxonomy ==
Eresus rubrocephalus belongs to the genus Eresus. Genetic analyses based on mitochondrial cox1 sequences placed it on a distinct lineage, separate from other species in its genus, and it was consistently recovered as an independent species in phylogenetic and species delimitation analyses. Morphologically, it is distinguished by an entirely carmine red cephalothorax and differences in male palpal structures. The description of E. rubrocephalus with Eresus almaghrib, Eresus gharbi, and Eresus elhennawyi, suggests the presence of a species formation and evolutionary hotspot in North Africa, particularly in Morocco, comparable to patterns reported from the Middle East.

=== Etymology ===
The species name rubrocephalus is derived from the Latin ruber ("red") and the Greek κεφάλι ("head"), referring to the species' red cephalothorax.

== Description ==
Only male specimens have been described. The male habitus is comparable to that of European and some Asian Eresus species.

The prosoma measures 5.68–8.95 mm in length. The head is slightly broader than the thorax, and both regions are more arched and convex than in related species. The carapace is densely covered with carmine-red hairs, with scattered white hairs, particularly on the thoracic region and sternum.

The chelicerae and clypeus bear predominantly red hairs, with a small number of white hairs. Leg coloration varies by pair. The first pair is black with white bands at the joints; the second pair has red segments with narrow white striping; the third and fourth pairs are dorsally red with white joint bands.

The dorsal surface of the abdomen is covered with red hairs and bears two pairs of black spots along the midline, bordered by narrow white outlines. The ventral surface is black, except for a red-haired area extending from the book lung covers to the spinnerets.

Male palps show a deep, hollow groove on the conductor plate, widening toward the base.

== Ecology ==
Adult males have been recorded in June, when individuals are observed moving outside their retreats.

== Habitat and distribution ==
The species is known from a single locality in Morocco, northeast of Sidi Allal El Bahraoui. Specimens were collected in a cork oak (Quercus suber) grove with sparse, herbaceous ground vegetation, on sandy soil containing iron-rich components.
