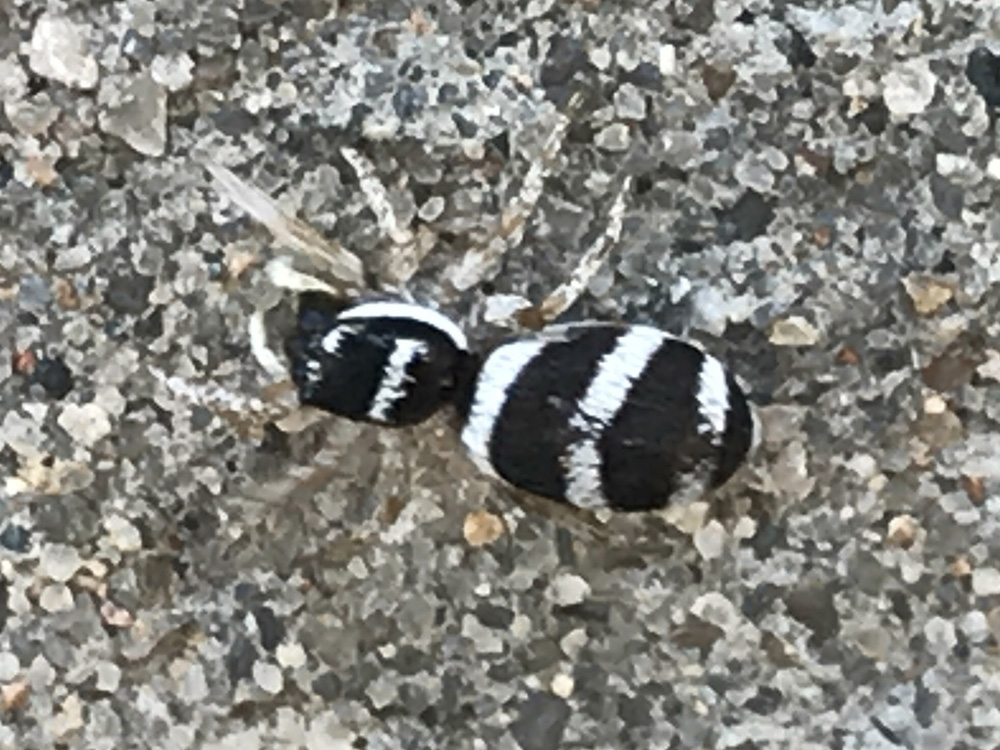
- Female in Fort Supply, Oklahoma

Scientific classification
- Kingdom: Animalia
- Phylum: Arthropoda
- Subphylum: Chelicerata
- Class: Arachnida
- Order: Araneae
- Infraorder: Araneomorphae
- Family: Salticidae
- Genus: Salticus
- Species: S. austinensis

Binomial name
- Salticus austinensis Gertsch, 1936

= Salticus austinensis =

Species of spider

Salticus austinensis, the zebra spider, is a species of jumping spider. It is found in the United States, Mexico, and Central America.

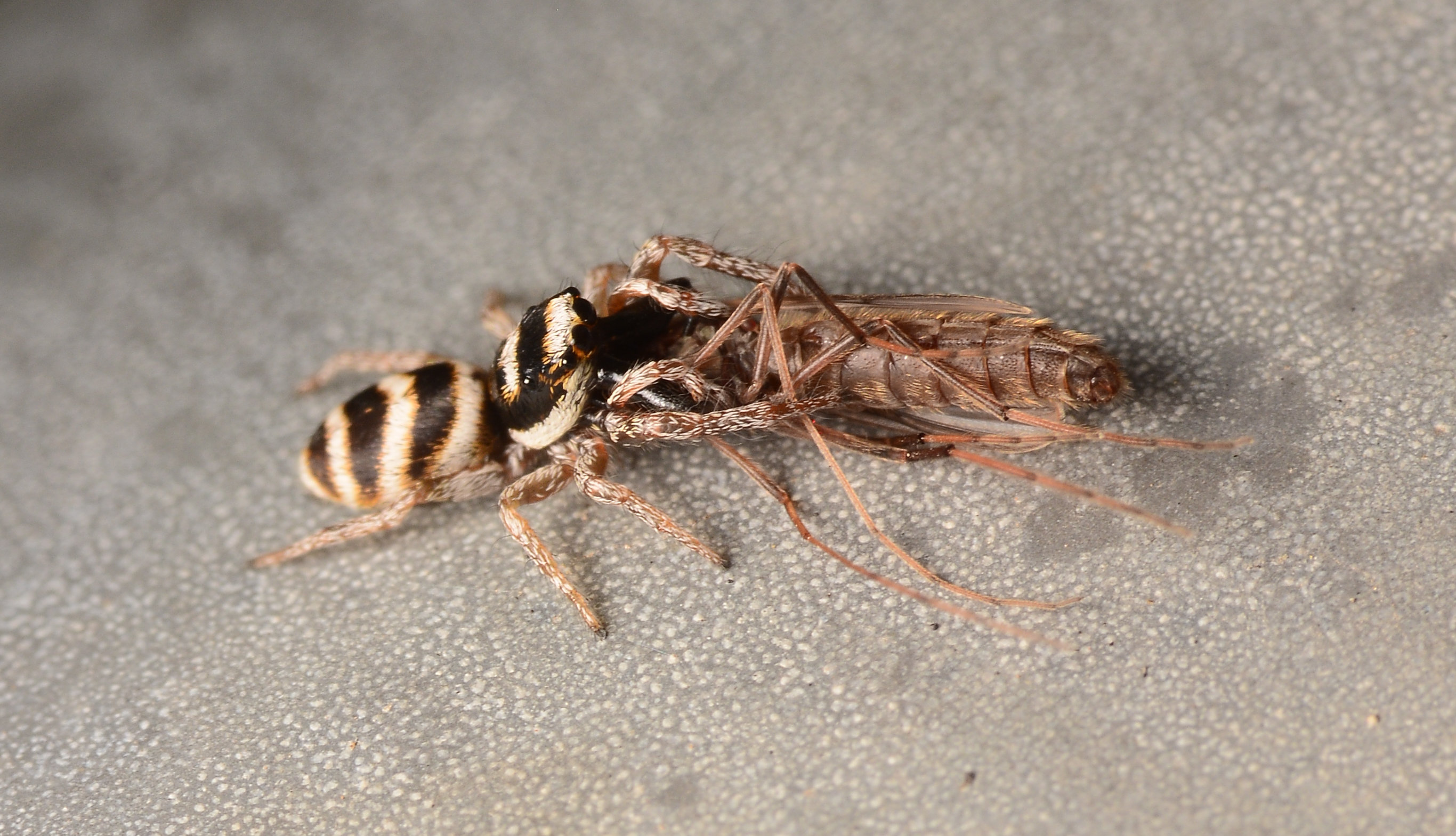
Male dorsal, showing elongated chelicera

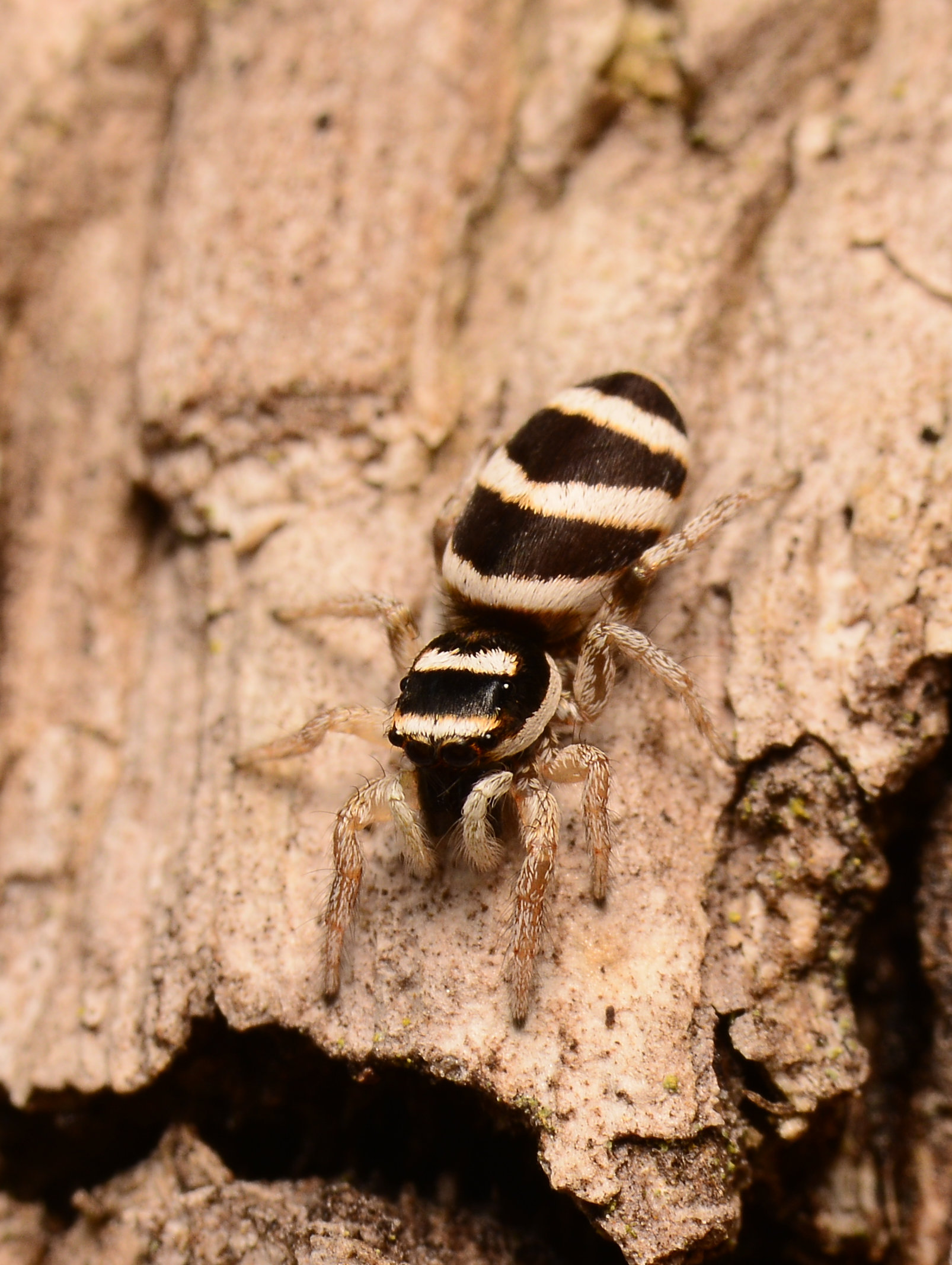
Female dorsal
