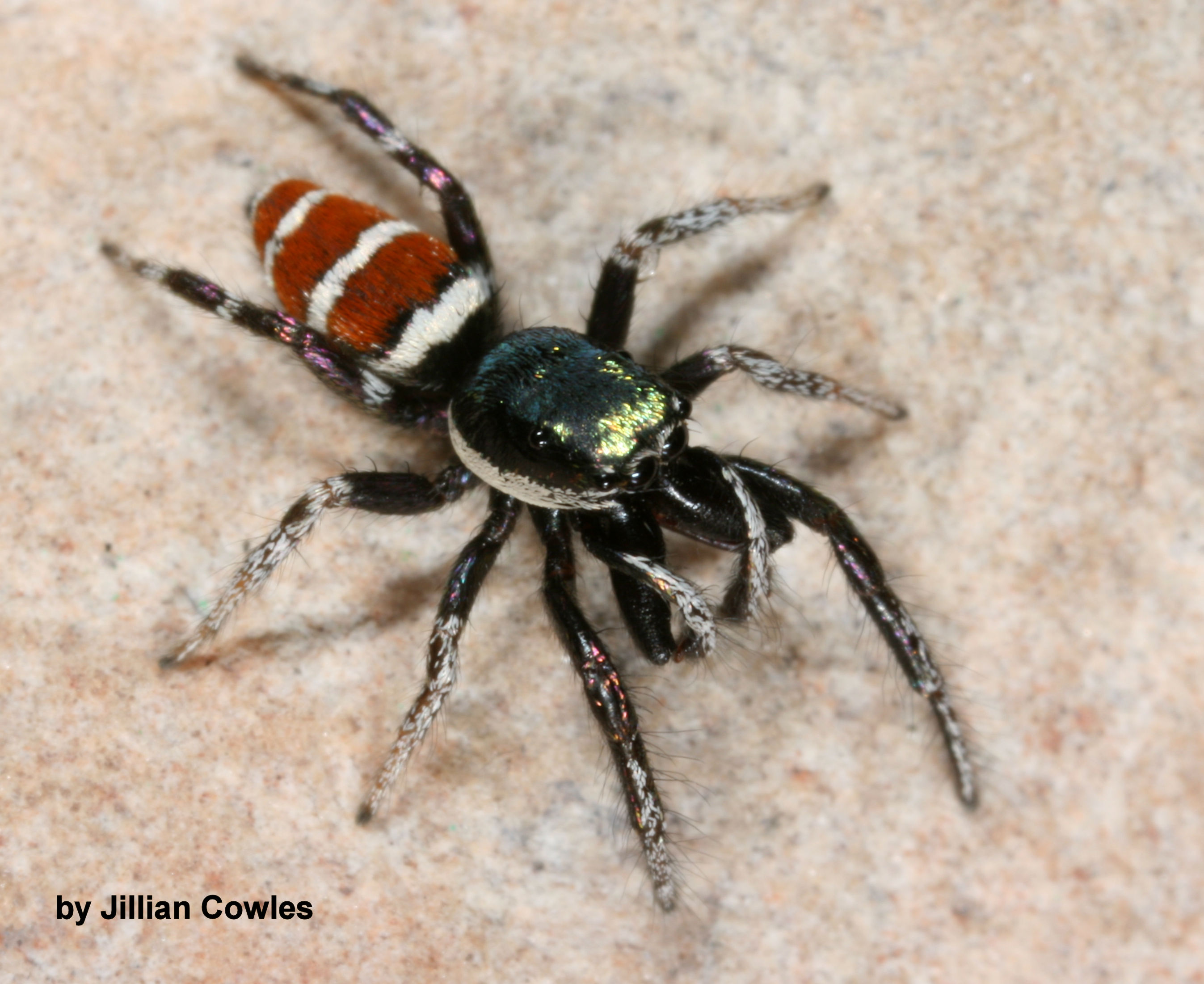

Scientific classification
- Kingdom: Animalia
- Phylum: Arthropoda
- Subphylum: Chelicerata
- Class: Arachnida
- Order: Araneae
- Infraorder: Araneomorphae
- Family: Salticidae
- Genus: Salticus
- Species: S. palpalis

Binomial name
- Salticus palpalis (Banks, 1904)

= Salticus palpalis =

Species of spider

Salticus palpalis is a species of spider from the family Salticidae.

== Description ==
The species are black coloured, with white stripes on the back. The males have brownish back, while females are completely black.
