= Salticus latidentatus =

Scientific classification
- Kingdom: Animalia
- Phylum: Arthropoda
- Subphylum: Chelicerata
- Class: Arachnida
- Order: Araneae
- Infraorder: Araneomorphae
- Family: Salticidae
- Genus: Salticus
- Species: S. latidentatus

Binomial name
- Salticus latidentatus Roewer, 1951

Synonyms
- Epiblemum latidens; Salticus latidens; Salticus potanini

Species of spider

Salticus latidentatus is a species of jumping spider that occurs in Russia, Mongolia and China, reaching into South China. The female is about four mm long. The carapace of the female is dark reddish brown anteriorly and somewhat lighter on the thorax. The greyish-white abdomen is oval and about twice as long as broad. The legs bear long black and white stripes.
