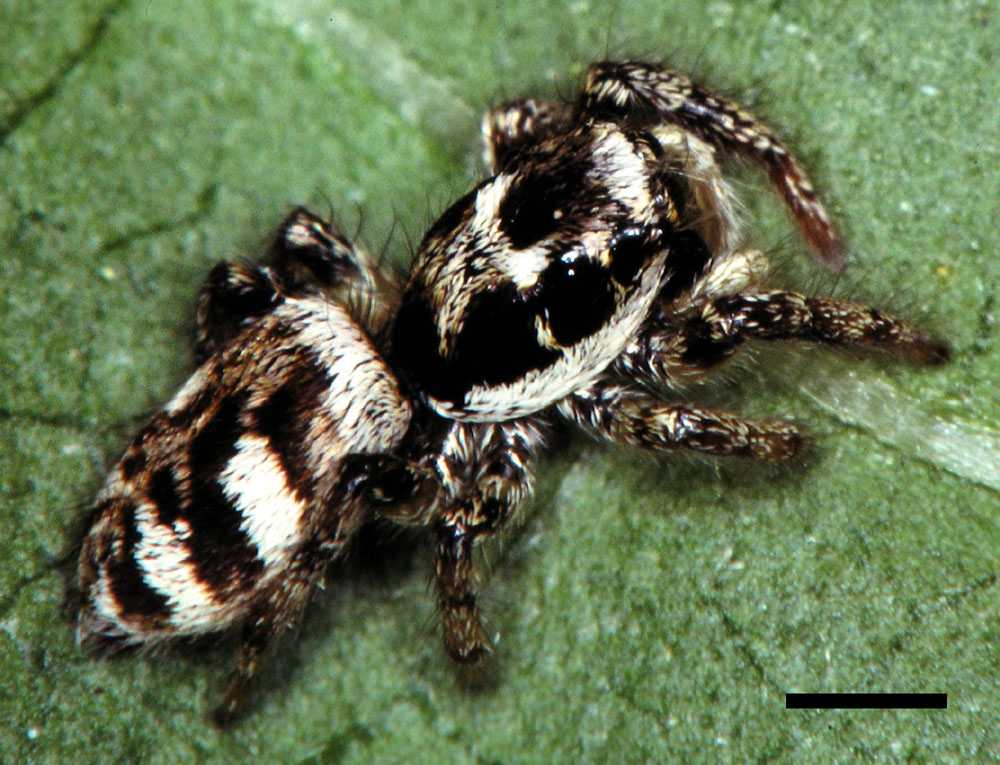
- Female Salticus scenicus
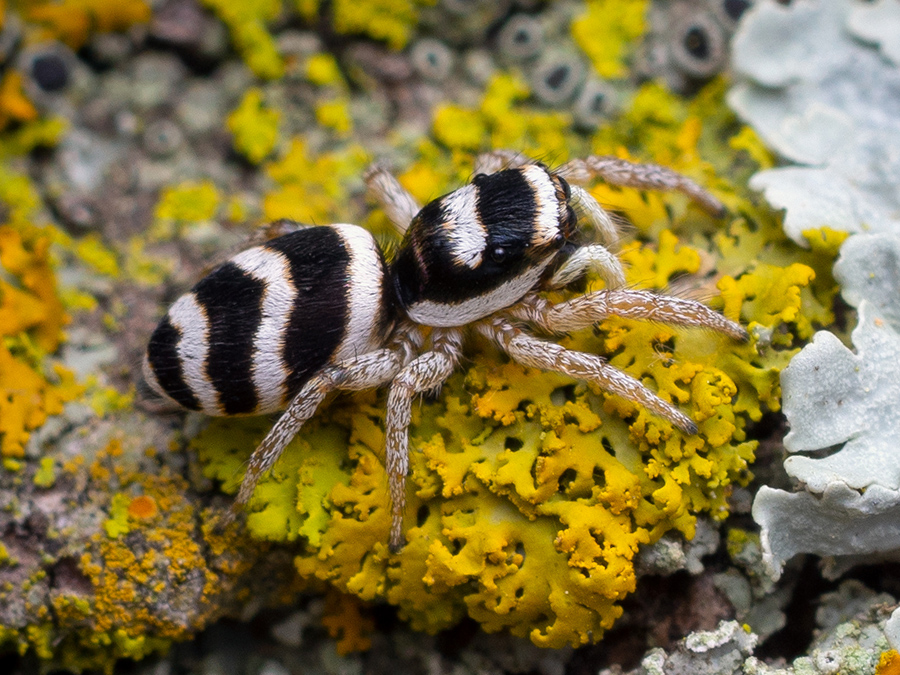
- S. austinensis

Scientific classification
- Kingdom: Animalia
- Phylum: Arthropoda
- Subphylum: Chelicerata
- Class: Arachnida
- Order: Araneae
- Infraorder: Araneomorphae
- Family: Salticidae
- Subfamily: Salticinae
- Genus: Salticus; Latreille, 1804

Type species
- Salticus scenicus (Clerck, 1757)

Species
- See text.

Synonyms
- Attus

= Salticus =

Genus of spiders

Salticus (from Latin “saltus” – leap or jump) is a genus of the family Salticidae (the jumping spiders). Salticus is the type genus for the family Salticidae.

== Description ==
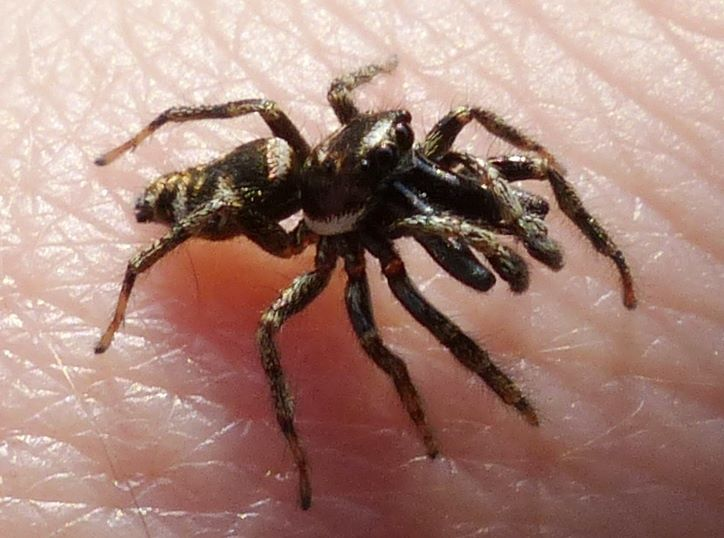
Male Salticus spider resting his pedipalps on his chelicerae

Coloration is determined by various scales (modified setae) covering a brown or black integument. Narrow scales (or hairs) may be black or red/rust colored, while broad scales are either iridescent (often magenta or green) or opaque granular white or yellow.

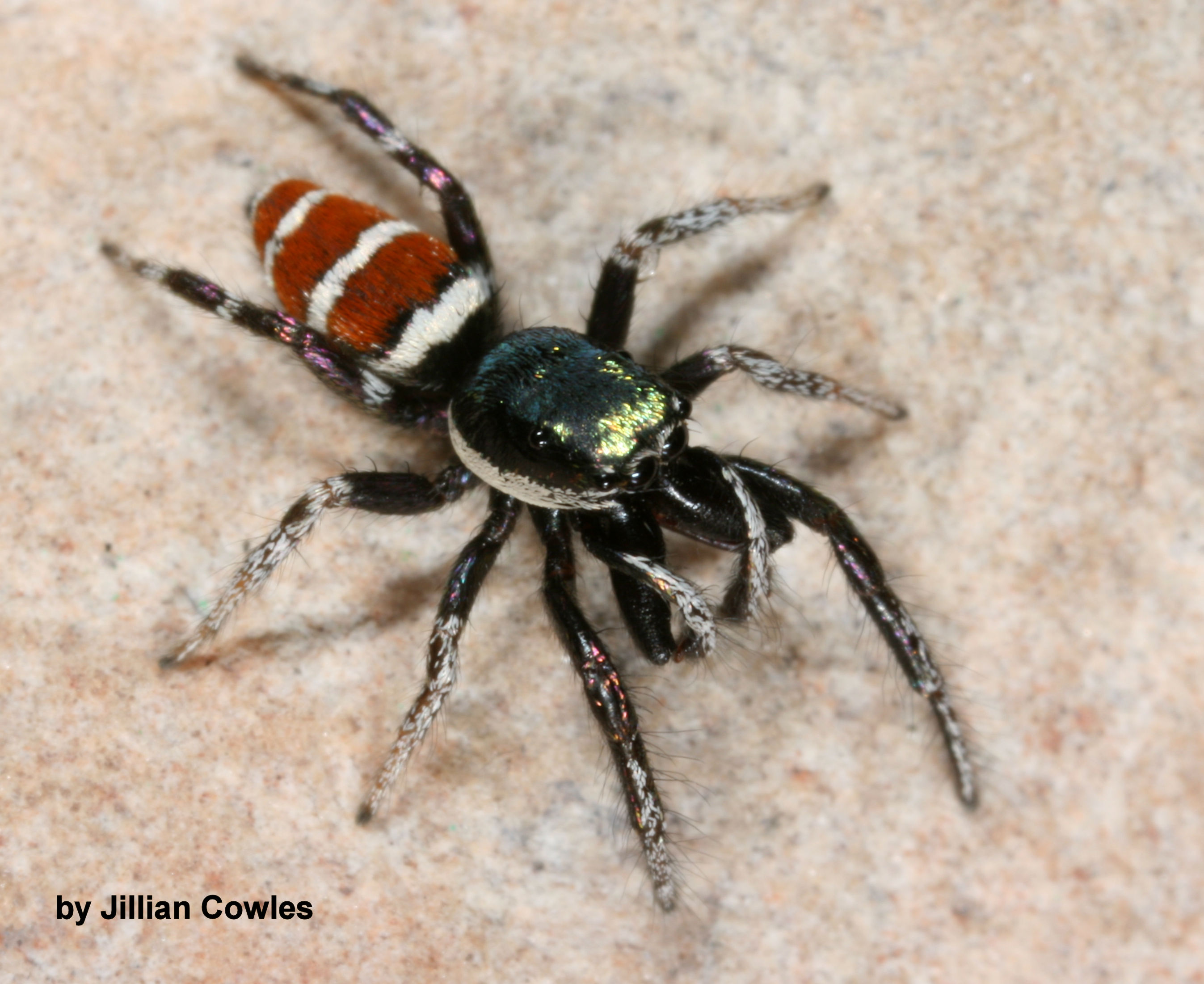
A mature male Salticus palpalis from Arizona, US.

Several common species have a dorsal pattern of black narrow scales and white granular scales arranged in transverse stripes, especially on the abdomen, from which the common name “zebra spiders” originates, e.g. Holarctic Salticus scenicus (Clerck, 1757). Some Salticus species in the Southwestern US and Mexico have red and white transverse stripes on the abdomen, e.g. Salticus palpalis (Banks, 1904). Some lack the “zebra” stripes completely and have both dorsal abdomen and cephalothorax covered with iridescent scales, e.g. Salticus peckhamae (Cockerell, 1897). Since the dorsal coloration does not seem to be involved in the male's courtship display the coloration may have been selected for camouflage or mimicry. For example, there is a strong similarity between S. palpalis and Agapostemon sweat bees.

Salticus species range in length from 3-7 mm. Males are smaller than females, but have elongated chelicerae and pedipalps.

== Habits ==
Like most Salticidae, they prefer open, sunny habitats. They are often found on vertical surfaces including man-made structures such as walls and fences or natural such as tree trunks. They are commonly found near water, where they feast on emergent aquatic gnats and other insects. One study recorded dipterans as 70% of prey items. Salticus species have been observed preying on insects several times their body size.

== Distribution ==
This genus has at least one species recorded from every continent except Antarctica. One common species, S. scenicus, is a widely distributed Holarctic species associated with human habitations. S. scenicus has the second most jumping spider observations on iNaturalist. Most other Salticus species have a more restricted distribution. Two areas with high species diversity are the Southwestern portion of the United States (into Mexico) and the Mediterranean. Four species have been recorded from the Canary Islands

== Species ==
Salticus cingulatus

As of October 2025, this genus includes 45 species:

- Salticus afghanicus Logunov & Zamanpoore, 2005 – Afghanistan
- Salticus aiderensis Logunov & Rakov, 1998 – Turkmenistan
- Salticus alegranzaensis Wunderlich, 1995 – Canary Islands
- Salticus annulatus (Giebel, 1870) – South Africa
- Salticus austinensis Gertsch, 1936 – United States, Mexico, Central America
- Salticus beneficus (O. Pickard-Cambridge, 1885) – India
- Salticus bonaerensis Holmberg, 1876 – Argentina
- Salticus brasiliensis Lucas, 1833 – Brazil
- Salticus canariensis Wunderlich, 1987 – Canary Islands
- Salticus cingulatus (Panzer, 1797) – Europe, Turkey, Russia (Europe to Far East), Kazakhstan, Mongolia
- Salticus confusus Lucas, 1846 – Portugal, Spain, France (Corsica), Bulgaria, Greece (Crete), Morocco, Algeria
- Salticus conjonctus (Simon, 1868) – Spain, France, Italy
- Salticus coronatus (Camboué, 1887) – Madagascar
- Salticus devotus (O. Pickard-Cambridge, 1885) – Pakistan
- Salticus dzhungaricus Logunov, 1992 – Kazakhstan, Turkmenistan
- Salticus falcarius (Hentz, 1846) – United States
- Salticus flavicruris (Rainbow, 1897) – Australia (New South Wales)
- Salticus gomerensis Wunderlich, 1987 – Canary Islands
- Salticus insperatus Logunov, 2009 – Iran
- Salticus iteacus Metzner, 1999 – Greece
- Salticus jugularis Simon, 1900 – Australia (Queensland)
- Salticus karakumensis Logunov & Ponomarev, 2020 – Turkmenistan
- Salticus kraali (Thorell, 1878) – Indonesia (Ambon)
- Salticus latidentatus Roewer, 1951 – Russia (South Siberia, Far East), Mongolia, China, Japan
- Salticus lucasi Zamani, Hosseini & Moradmand, 2020 – Iran
- Salticus major (Simon, 1868) – Portugal, Spain, France
- Salticus meticulosus Lucas, 1846 – Algeria
- Salticus modicus (Simon, 1875) – France
- Salticus mutabilis Lucas, 1846 – Macaronesia, Europe, North Africa, Turkey, Caucasus. Introduced to Argentina
- Salticus noordami Metzner, 1999 – Greece, Turkey, Cyprus, Israel, Iran
- Salticus palpalis (Banks, 1904) – United States, Mexico
- Salticus paludivagus Lucas, 1846 – Algeria
- Salticus peckhamae (Cockerell, 1897) – United States
- Salticus perogaster (Thorell, 1881) – Papua New Guinea (Yule Is.)
- Salticus propinquus Lucas, 1846 – Mediterranean
- Salticus proszynskii Logunov, 1992 – Kyrgyzstan, Kazakhstan
- Salticus ravus (Bösenberg, 1895) – Canary Islands
- Salticus ressli Logunov, 2015 – Turkey
- Salticus scenicus (Clerck, 1757) – North America, Europe, Russia (Europe to Far East), Caucasus, Kazakhstan, Iran (type species)
- Salticus scitulus (Simon, 1868) – France (Corsica)
- Salticus tricinctus (C. L. Koch, 1846) – Mediterranean to Central Asia, Iran, Kazakhstan, Afghanistan
- Salticus turkmenicus Logunov & Rakov, 1998 – Turkmenistan
- Salticus unciger (Simon, 1868) – France, Switzerland, Italy, Malta, Slovenia, Albania
- Salticus unicolor (Simon, 1868) – Slovakia, Hungary, Bulgaria, Greece
- Salticus zebraneus (C. L. Koch, 1837) – Europe, Turkey, Russia (Europe, Caucasus), Iran
