= Eresus rotundiceps =

Scientific classification
- Kingdom: Animalia
- Phylum: Arthropoda
- Subphylum: Chelicerata
- Class: Arachnida
- Order: Araneae
- Infraorder: Araneomorphae
- Family: Eresidae
- Genus: Eresus
- Species: E. rotundiceps

Binomial name
- Eresus rotundiceps Simon, 1873

Species of spider

Eresus rotundiceps is a spider species found in Ukraine and Turkmenistan.
