= Salticus coronatus =

Scientific classification
- Kingdom: Animalia
- Phylum: Arthropoda
- Subphylum: Chelicerata
- Class: Arachnida
- Order: Araneae
- Infraorder: Araneomorphae
- Family: Salticidae
- Genus: Salticus
- Species: S. coronatus

Binomial name
- Salticus coronatus (Camboué, 1887)

Species of spider

Salticus coronatus is a species of spider in the family Salticidae endemic to Madagascar.
