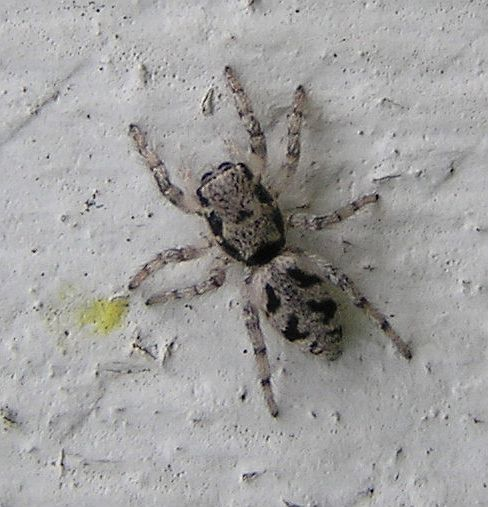

Scientific classification
- Kingdom: Animalia
- Phylum: Arthropoda
- Subphylum: Chelicerata
- Class: Arachnida
- Order: Araneae
- Infraorder: Araneomorphae
- Family: Salticidae
- Genus: Salticus
- Species: S. cingulatus

Binomial name
- Salticus cingulatus (Panzer, 1797)

Synonyms
- Aranea cingulata Panzer, 1797; Attus cordicalis Hahn, 1826; Attus lineolatus Sundevall, 1833; Epiblemum cingulatum Thorell, 1873; Calliethera cingulatus Simon, 1876; Epiblemum cingulatum O. Pickard-Cambridge, 1881; Calliethera cingulatus Becker, 1882

= Salticus cingulatus =

Species of spider

Salticus cingulatus is a Palearctic jumping spider (family Salticidae).

== Description ==
The female Salticus cingulatus has a body length of 5.2–5.5 mm while the male's is 3.4–6 mm. On the male the palpal bulb is distally forked, with a long visible part. On the female the epigyne is strongly sclerotized, the anterior part opaque. The prosoma is black, with white spots, and the opisthosoma is black, but largely covered with white hairs. It is similar to Salticus scenicus but it is normally distinguished by being much paler due to more white hairs on the prosoma.

== Habitat and ecology ==
The favoured habitat of Salticus cingulatus is old tree trunks and fence palings situated in sunny situations in or close to woodland, fens and heathland. It is frequently encountered on pines. It is occasionally encountered on buildings. Males are active in May and June, females mostly between May and July, but they occasionally persist until autumn.

== Distribution ==
Salticus cingulatus has a Palearctic distribution. It is found throughout Europe except Iceland. It is a widely distributed species in Great Britain but with only scattered records on the west, south-east and the far north.
