= Eresus cinnaberinus =

Former name for a group of spiders in the genus Eresus

Eresus cinnaberinus and Eresus niger are names formerly used for a group of spiders in the genus Eresus now divided into three species, E. kollari, E. sandaliatus, and E. moravicus. The three species differ in size, colour pattern, shape of prosoma and copulatory organs, and habitat, with no morphologically intermediate forms. As eastern and western E. kollari are genetically different, with the eastern form likely a hybrid between "pure" E. kollari and E. moravicus, it is possible that later revisions will partition it into additional species.

Both E. cinnaberinus and E. niger are now regarded as nomina dubia.

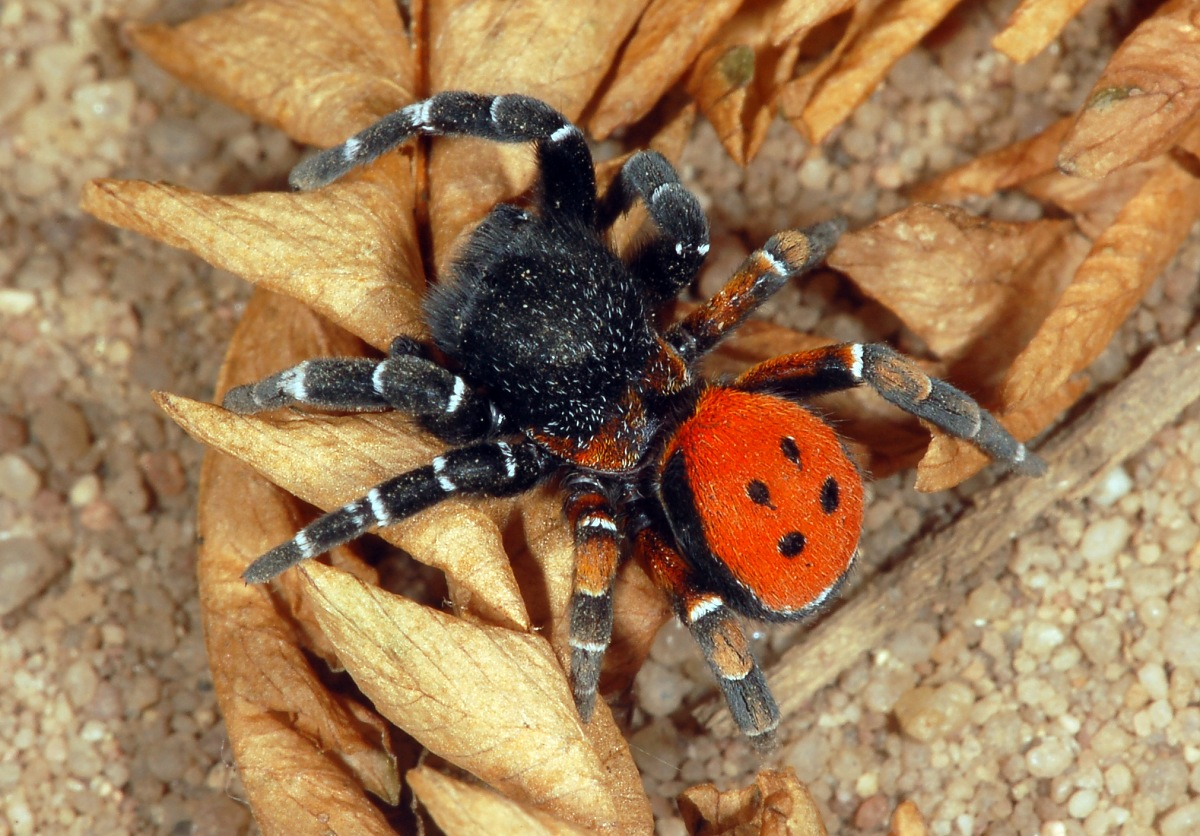
Eresus kollari

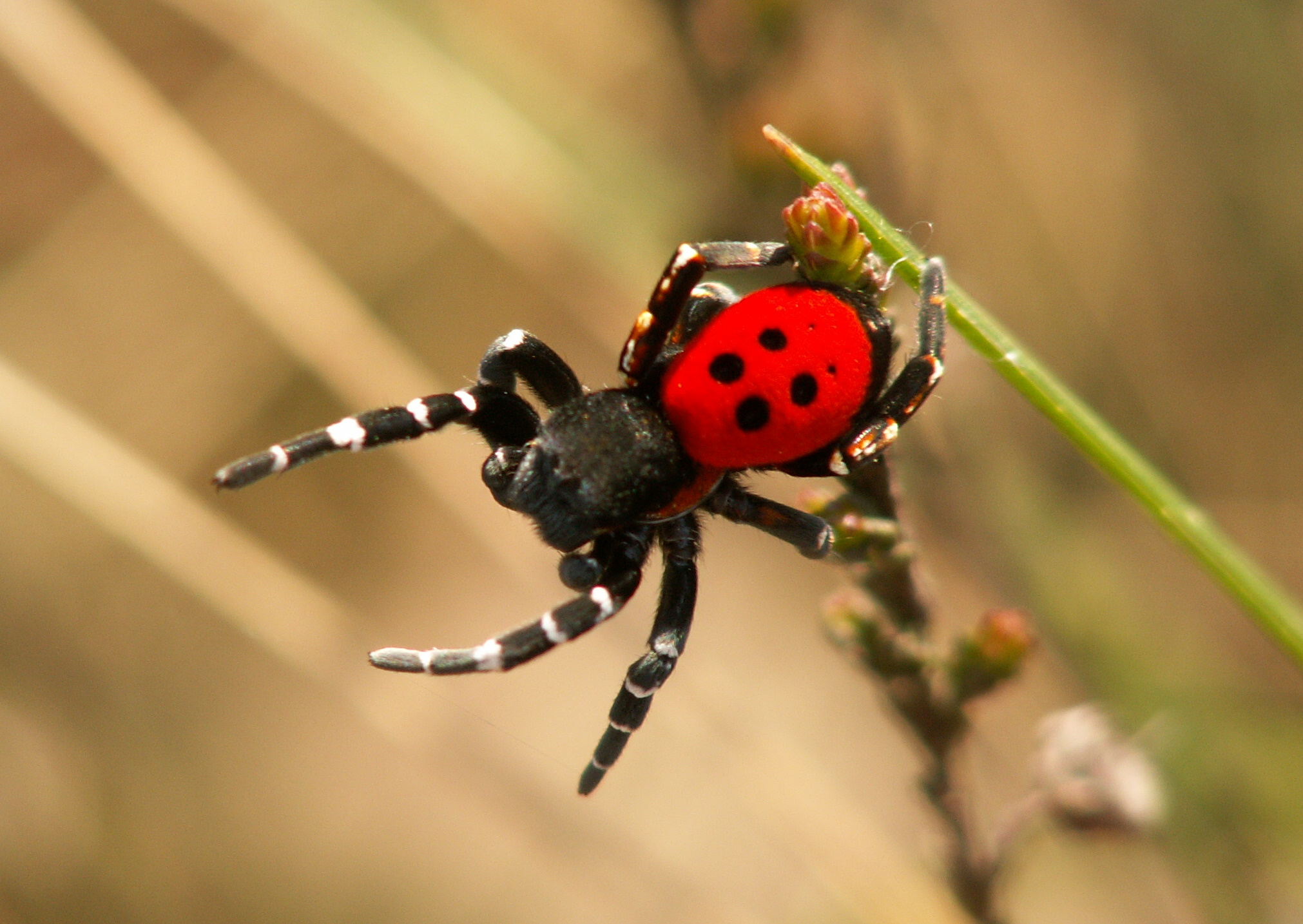
Eresus sandaliatus

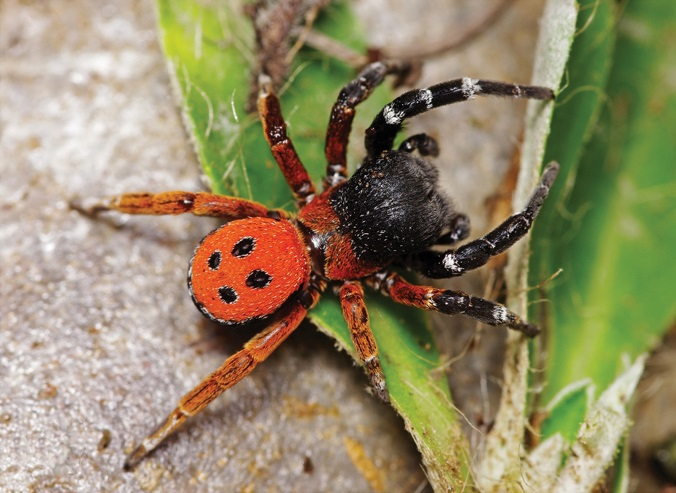
Eresus moravicus

== Distributions ==
- E. kollari has the widest distribution of the three species, occurring from Spain and Portugal to Novosibirsk in Russia.
- E. moravicus occurs in the Pannonian region, the Balkan Peninsula and parts of the Austrian Alps.
- E. sandaliatus occurs in northern Europe (Denmark, southern Sweden, southern England, Schleswig-Holstein in Germany) and in western central Europe (the Czech Republic, the Danube region in Bavaria, the Austrian Alps, northern France).
