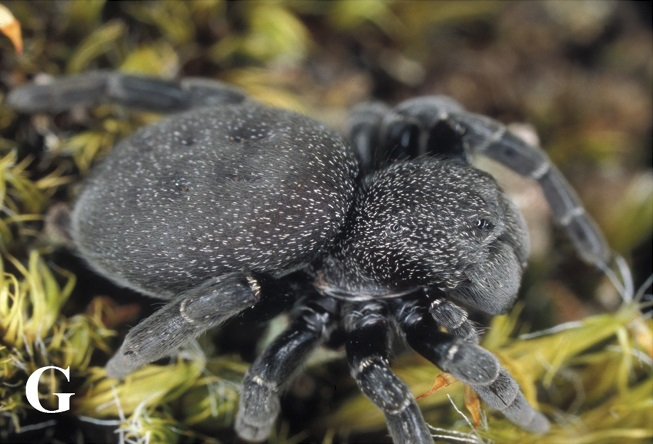
- Subadult female from Denmark
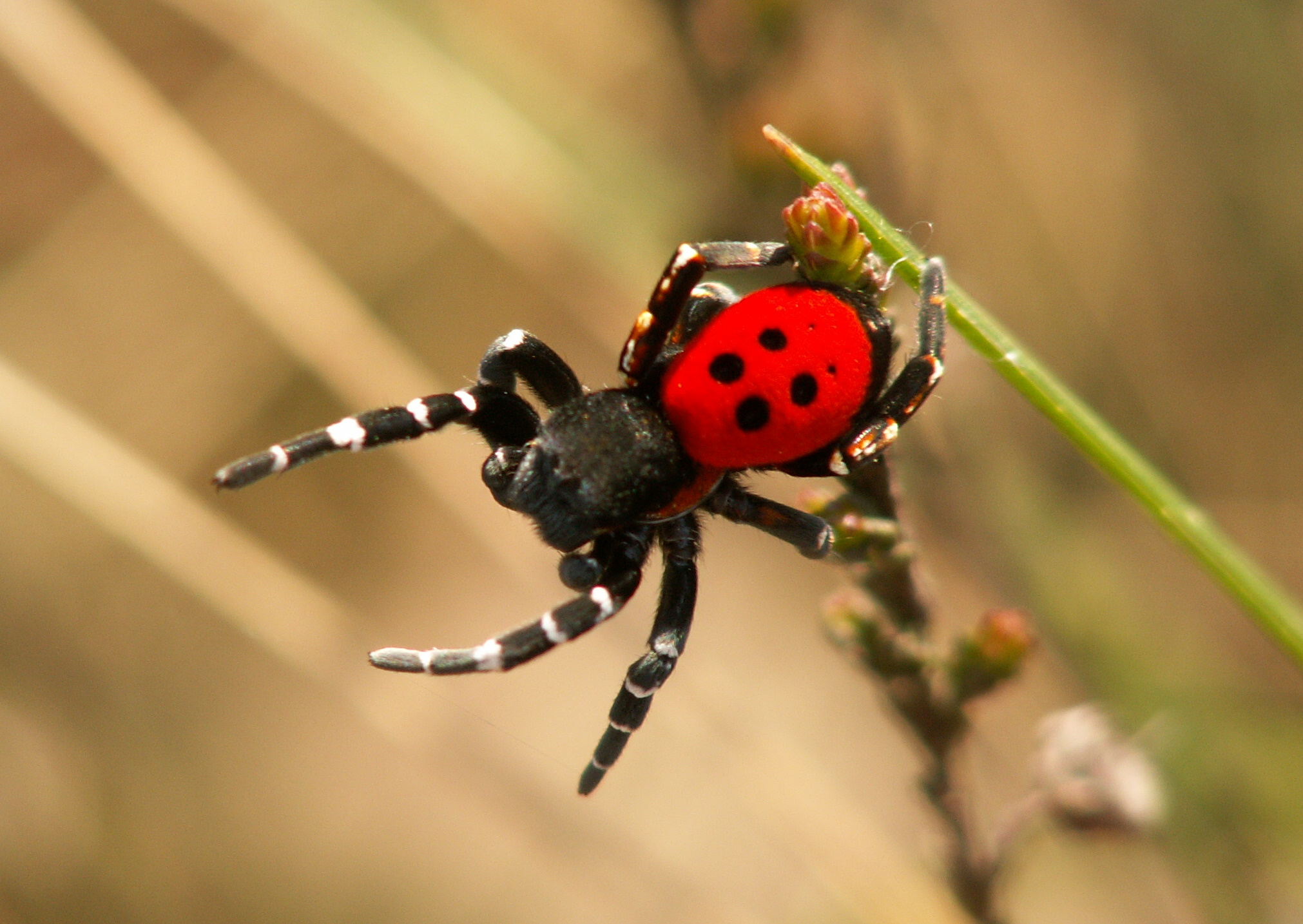
- Male

Scientific classification
- Kingdom: Animalia
- Phylum: Arthropoda
- Subphylum: Chelicerata
- Class: Arachnida
- Order: Araneae
- Infraorder: Araneomorphae
- Family: Eresidae
- Genus: Eresus
- Species: E. sandaliatus

Binomial name
- Eresus sandaliatus (Martini & Goeze, 1778)
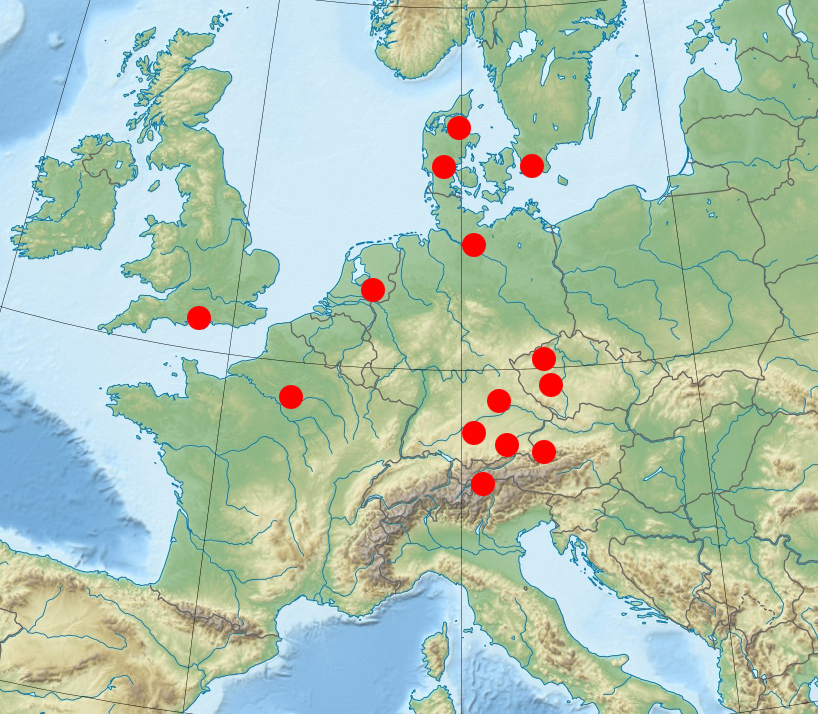

Synonyms
- Aranea sandaliata Aranea purpurata Eresus annulatus Erythrophorus annulatus

= Eresus sandaliatus =

Species of spider

Eresus sandaliatus is a species of spider found primarily in northern and central Europe. Like other species of the genus Eresus, it is commonly called ladybird spider because of the coloration of the male.

E. sandaliatus is one of the three species into which Eresus cinnaberinus or Eresus niger has been divided.

== Description ==
Drawing of male by CL Koch (1846)

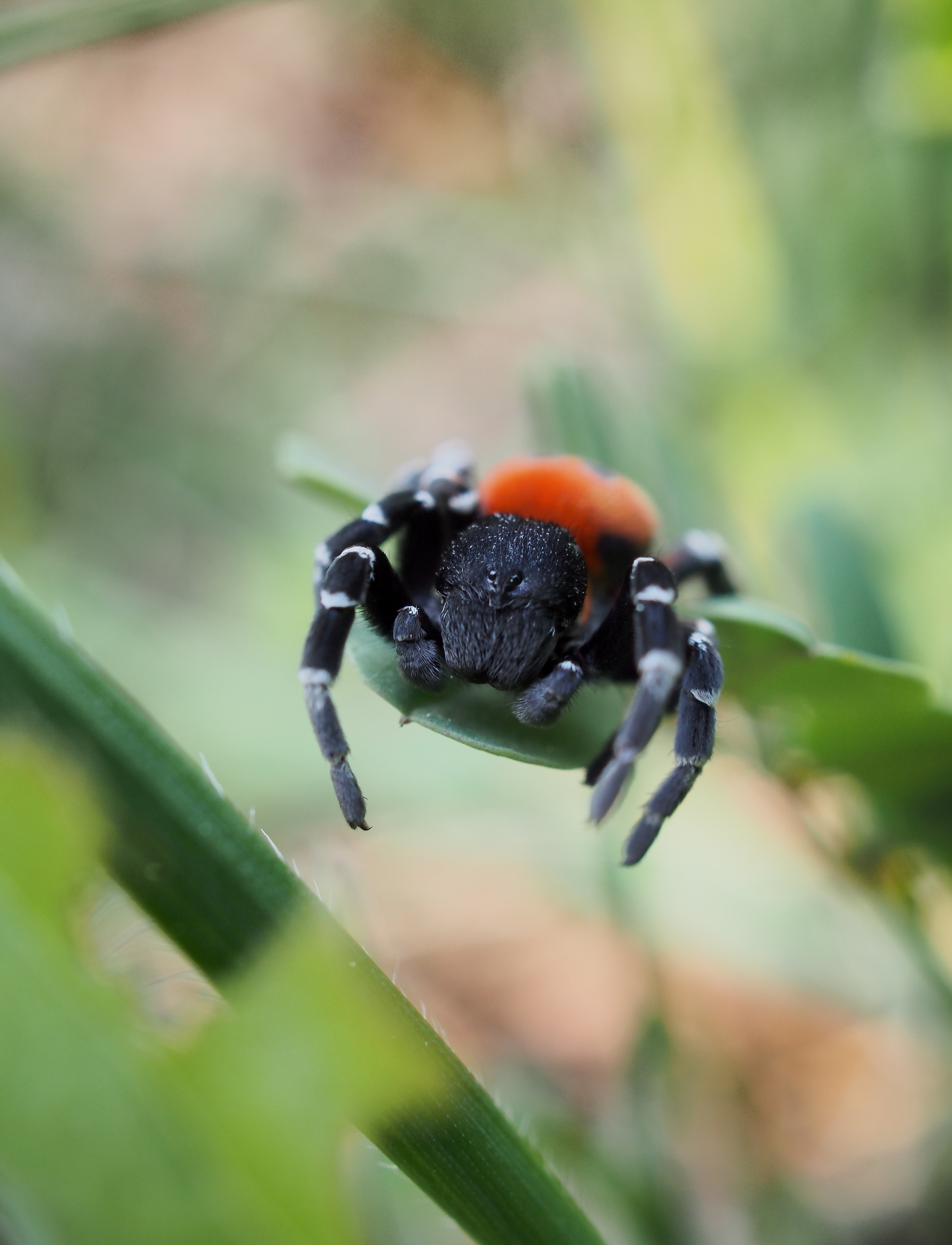
Frontal view of male

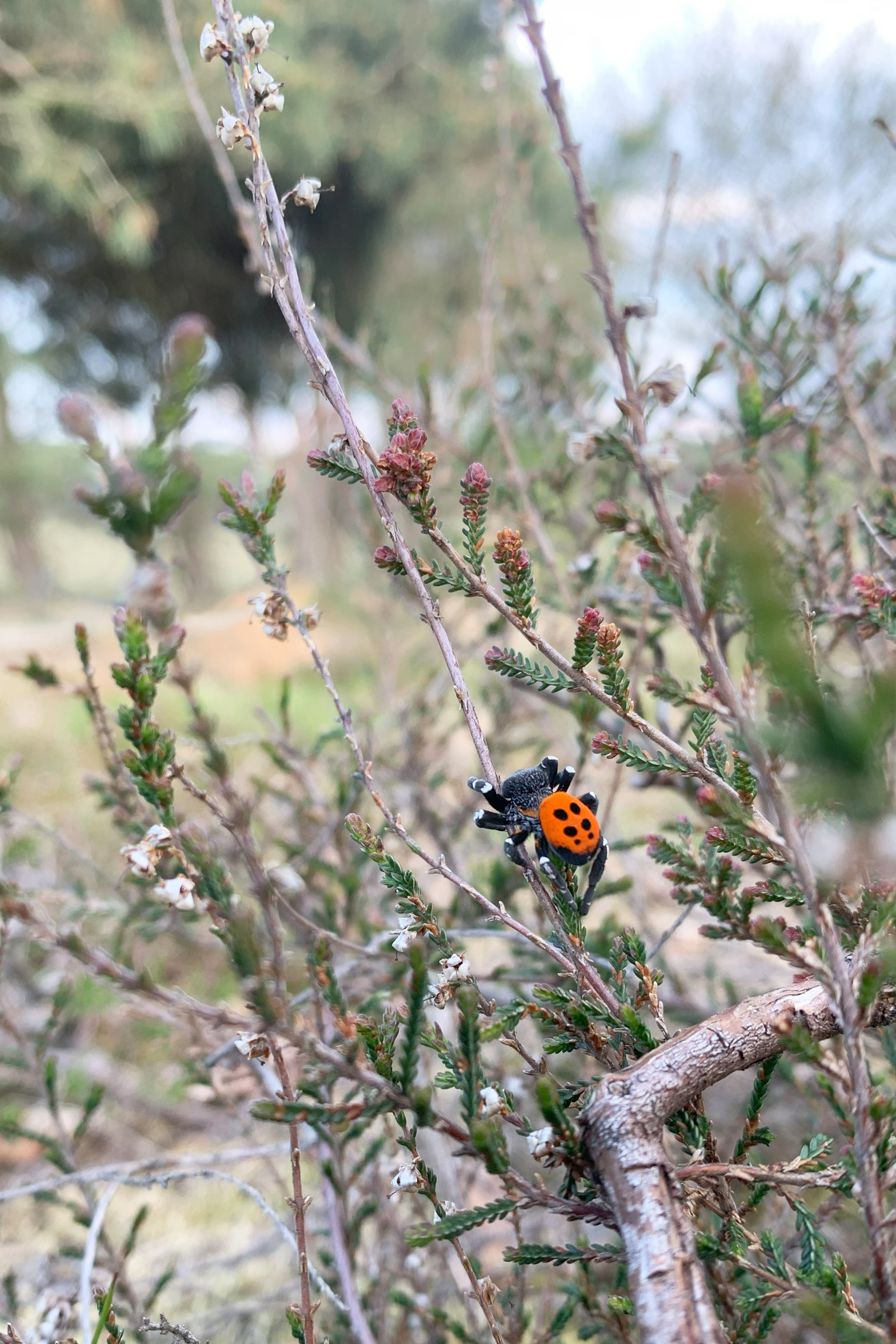
Male on vegetation

Male E. sandaliatus are generally 6 to 9 millimetres (0.24 to 0.35 in) (a little bit smaller than other species of the E. cinnaberinus complex) and characterized by a bright orange back featuring four large and two small ebony spots. White hairs are never present on the back, and legs always lack red hairs. In contrast, the females are 10 to 16 millimetres (0.39 to 0.63 in) and jet-black.

== Habits ==
Males enter the adult stage in early September, but overwinter in their webs and search for females only in May or June of the next year. Otherwise, this species is very similar to other species of E. cinnaberinus complex. After the 35-80 eggs hatch, the spiderlings receive a liquid from the mouth of the female. The female later seems to digest its own body, which leads to her death a few days later. The spiderlings then suck on the mother. The next spring they leave the web and build their own in close vicinity.

== Distribution ==
E. sandaliatus is native to Europe.

== Conservation ==
It is classified as endangered by the British Red Data Book and hence protected under the 1981 Wildlife and Countryside Act.

In 1993 it was estimated that only about 50 individual ladybird spiders were left in Britain, mainly due to deprivation of an appropriate habitat. In 2000, however, over 600 separate ladybird spiders were counted, probably owing to the efforts of English Nature's Species Recovery Programme and affiliated operations. It is currently the focus of a Back from the Brink conservation project, which aims to translocate spiders to start new populations.

In France, it is classified as near threatened. In Germany, it is listed as highly endangered. And in Sweden, it is listed as vulnerable due to its high risk of extinction.

== Bibliography ==
- ARKive: Ladybird spider, 2004. Retrieved January 14, 2006.
- Johannesen J, Veith M (July 2001). "Population history of Eresus cinnaberinus (Araneae: Eresidae) colour variants at a putative species transition". Heredity. 87 (Pt 1): 114–24. doi:10.1046/j.1365-2540.2001.00915.x. PMID 11678993.
