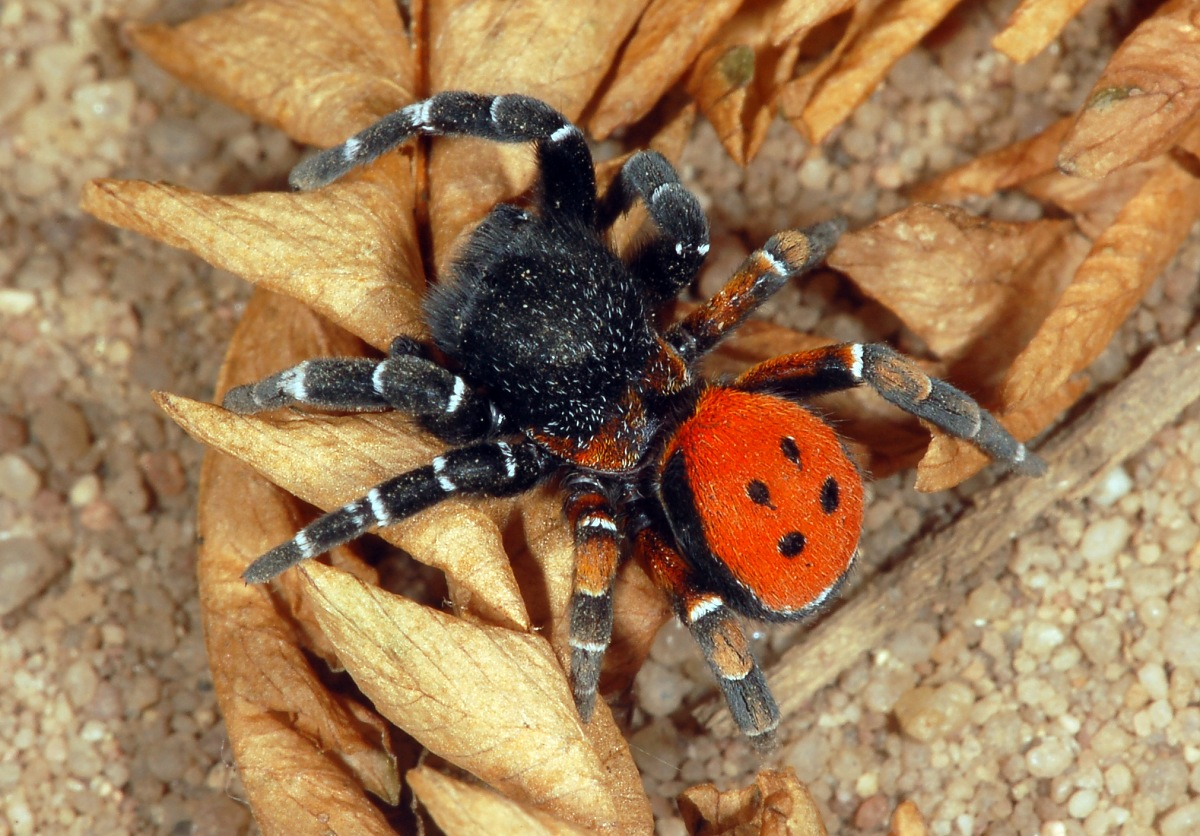
- Male
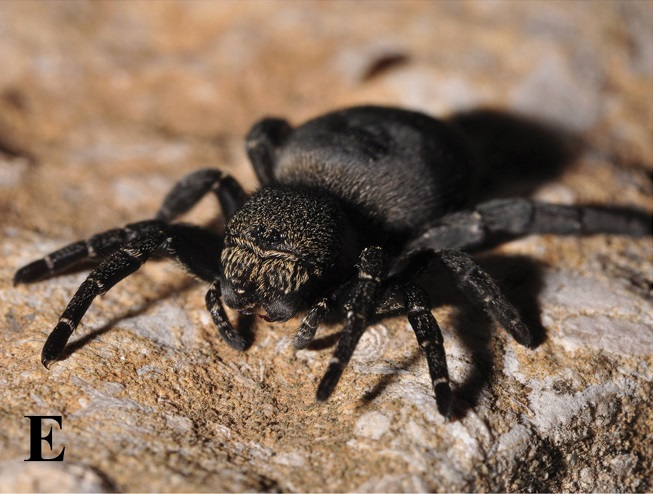
- Female

Scientific classification
- Kingdom: Animalia
- Phylum: Arthropoda
- Subphylum: Chelicerata
- Class: Arachnida
- Order: Araneae
- Infraorder: Araneomorphae
- Family: Eresidae
- Genus: Eresus
- Species: E. kollari

Binomial name
- Eresus kollari Rossi, 1846

= Eresus kollari =

Species of spider

Eresus kollari, the ladybird spider or the Polish ladybird spider, is a spider species in the family Eresidae. It was first described by Walckenaer in 1802, though it was misidentified. It was later correctly described by Rossi in 1846. It is one of the three species into which Eresus cinnaberinus or Eresus niger has been divided. It is thought to be endangered.

== Description ==
The ladybird spider's body, as with most velvet spiders, somewhat resembles those of species in the jumping spider family. The male has a highly contrasting black and orange-red coloration, while the female is completely black. The opisthosoma looks velvety, as the species's common name would imply.

== Colonies ==
In colonies, they burrow up to 10 cm in depth which is usually covered in a funnel web. Females may carry a lens-shaped egg sack containing up to 100 eggs, which is taken to a sunny place. The juveniles will stay in the female's burrow and feed on her after she dies. They usually form small colonies of up to a couple dozen spiders, but they may reach several hundred or more.

== Bite ==
Although ladybird spiders are small in size, they are able to bite. A bite to a finger may cause pain, fever symptoms, an increased heart rate, and a headache; these effects last a few hours. The bite is not medically significant and mostly disappears after a few days.

== Habitat ==
They inhabit warm areas, in areas with loose and low vegetation. This spider most often occurs in grasslands, though it has also been found in dry and bright forests. It is found all throughout Europe, except in the north.

== Predators ==
Some species of wasp of the family Pompilidae hunt exclusively on the Eresus genus. These wasps enter a burrow and look for the spider, and they paralyse it with strong venom. The female lays the eggs on the spider, and after a few days, the eggs hatch. These larvae eat and kill the spider.
