= Eresus ruficapillus =

Scientific classification
- Kingdom: Animalia
- Phylum: Arthropoda
- Subphylum: Chelicerata
- Class: Arachnida
- Order: Araneae
- Infraorder: Araneomorphae
- Family: Eresidae
- Genus: Eresus
- Species: E. ruficapillus

Binomial name
- Eresus ruficapillus C.L. Koch, 1846

Species of spider

Eresus ruficapillus is a spider species found in Sicily and Croatia.
