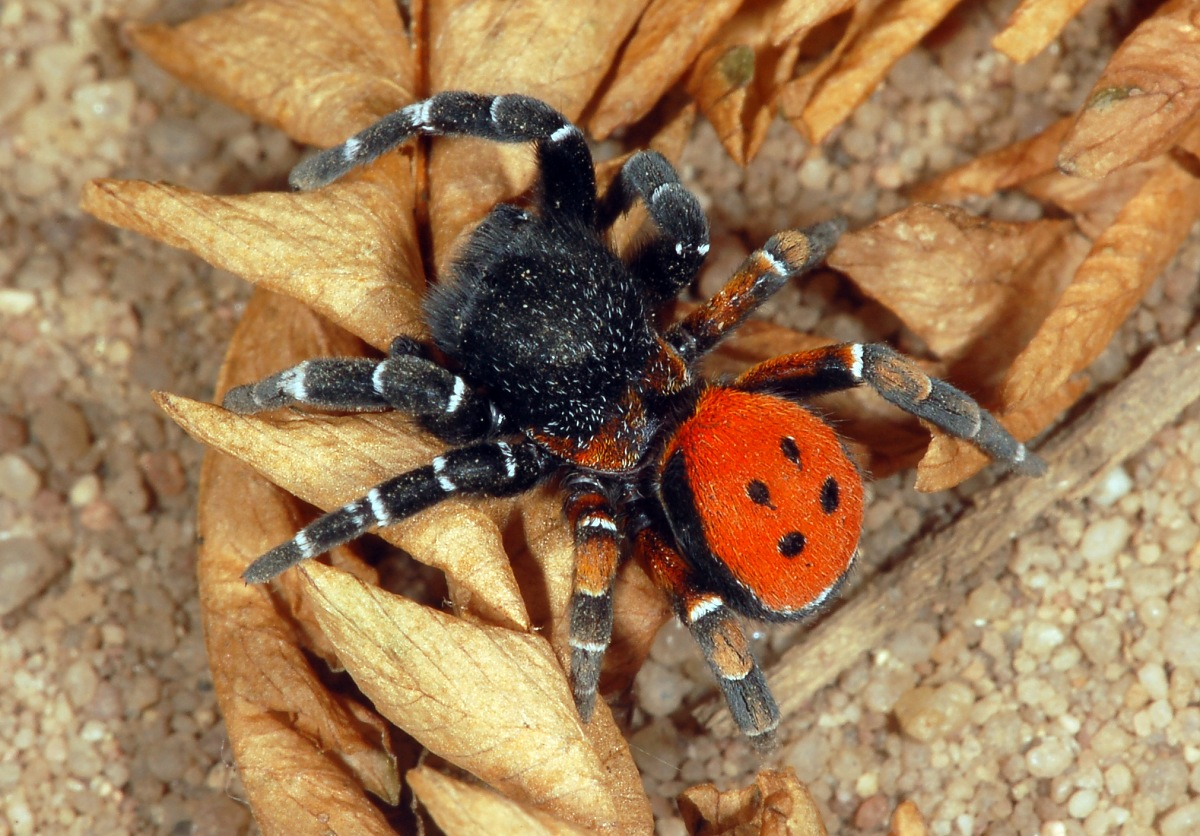
- Male Eresus kollari

Scientific classification
- Kingdom: Animalia
- Phylum: Arthropoda
- Subphylum: Chelicerata
- Class: Arachnida
- Order: Araneae
- Infraorder: Araneomorphae
- Family: Eresidae
- Genus: Eresus; Walckenaer, 1805

Species
- 24, see text

= Eresus =

Genus of spiders

Eresus, also called ladybird spiders, is a genus of velvet spiders (family Eresidae) that was first described by Charles Athanase Walckenaer in 1805. Members of the genus formerly called Eresus cinnaberinus or Eresus niger are now placed in one of three species: Eresus kollari, Eresus sandaliatus and Eresus moravicus. A new species Eresus urus (named after the ancient Mesopotamian city of Ur), was discovered in southern Iraq in March 2025.

== Description ==
They resemble both jumping spiders and the spiders in the Palpimanidae, as their body shapes are similar and their body is velvety. Males of this genus have a red abdomen with black spotting, usually sporting 4 black spots. The rest of the body is usually black, with some reddish or white areas. Females of this genus usually have dull colors, in grey, brown or black tones. For most individuals, the full body length reaches 8.5 to 20mm, with a distinct prosomal length of 3.6 to 6.1 mm. In some species, the females have some yellow coloration, though they are still significantly duller than the males.

== Identification ==
Males of this genus can usually be distinguished by their unique abdominal pattern. Which in the lateral areas has two pairs of black patches which is surrounded by some reddish coloration. Sometimes they also have an extra pair. Females are harder to distinguish, with a species specific dedicated identification section being needed.

== Distribution ==
They are found in Europe, Asia, and Africa, usually in non-forested warm and dry habitats. Their life cycle is completed in 3–4 years, after they undergo dispersion and reach a juvenile state and turn into predators. Some species build a vertical burrow which is lined with silk, the opening being camouflaged with a silken sheet of debris.

== Species ==
As of March 2025 it contains twenty-three species and five subspecies:

- Eresus adaleari Zamani & Szűts, 2020 - Iran
- Eresus albopictus Simon, 1873 – Morocco, Algeria
- Eresus bifasciatus Ermolajev, 1937 – Russia (South Siberia)
- Eresus crassitibialis Wunderlich, 1987 – Canary Is.
- Eresus da Lin & Li, 2022 – China
- Eresus elhennawyi Řezáč, Vaněk & Střeštík, 2023 – Morocco, Algeria
- Eresus granosus Simon, 1895 – Russia (West Siberia), China
- Eresus hermani Kovács, Prazsák, Eichardt, Vári & Gyurkovics, 2015 – Hungary, Slovakia
- Eresus kollari Rossi, 1846 – Europe, Turkey, Caucasus, Russia (Europe to Far East), Iran, Central Asia
  - Eresus k. frontalis Latreille, 1819 – Spain
  - Eresus k. ignicomis Simon, 1914 – France (Corsica)
  - Eresus k. latefasciatus Simon, 1911 – Algeria
  - Eresus k. tricolor Simon, 1873 – France (Corsica)
- Eresus lavrosiae Mcheidze, 1997 – Georgia
- Eresus lishizheni 2021 - China
- Eresus moravicus Řezáč, 2008 – Austria, Hungary, Czech Rep., Slovakia, Albania
- Eresus pharaonis Walckenaer, 1837 – Egypt
- Eresus robustus Franganillo, 1918 – Spain
- Eresus rotundiceps Simon, 1873 – Ukraine, Turkmenistan
- Eresus rubrocephalus - Morocco
- Eresus ruficapillus C. L. Koch, 1846 – Italy (Sicily)
- Eresus sandaliatus (Martini & Goeze, 1778) – Europe
- Eresus sedilloti Simon, 1881 – Portugal, Spain
- Eresus solitarius Simon, 1873 – Mediterranean
- Eresus tristis Kroneberg, 1875 - Kazakhstan
- Eresus urus Al-Yacoub & Zamani, 2025 – Iraq
- Eresus walckenaeri Brullé, 1832 – Mediterranean
  - Eresus w. moerens C. L. Koch, 1846 – Afghanistan
- Eresus yukuni Lin & Li, 2022 – China
