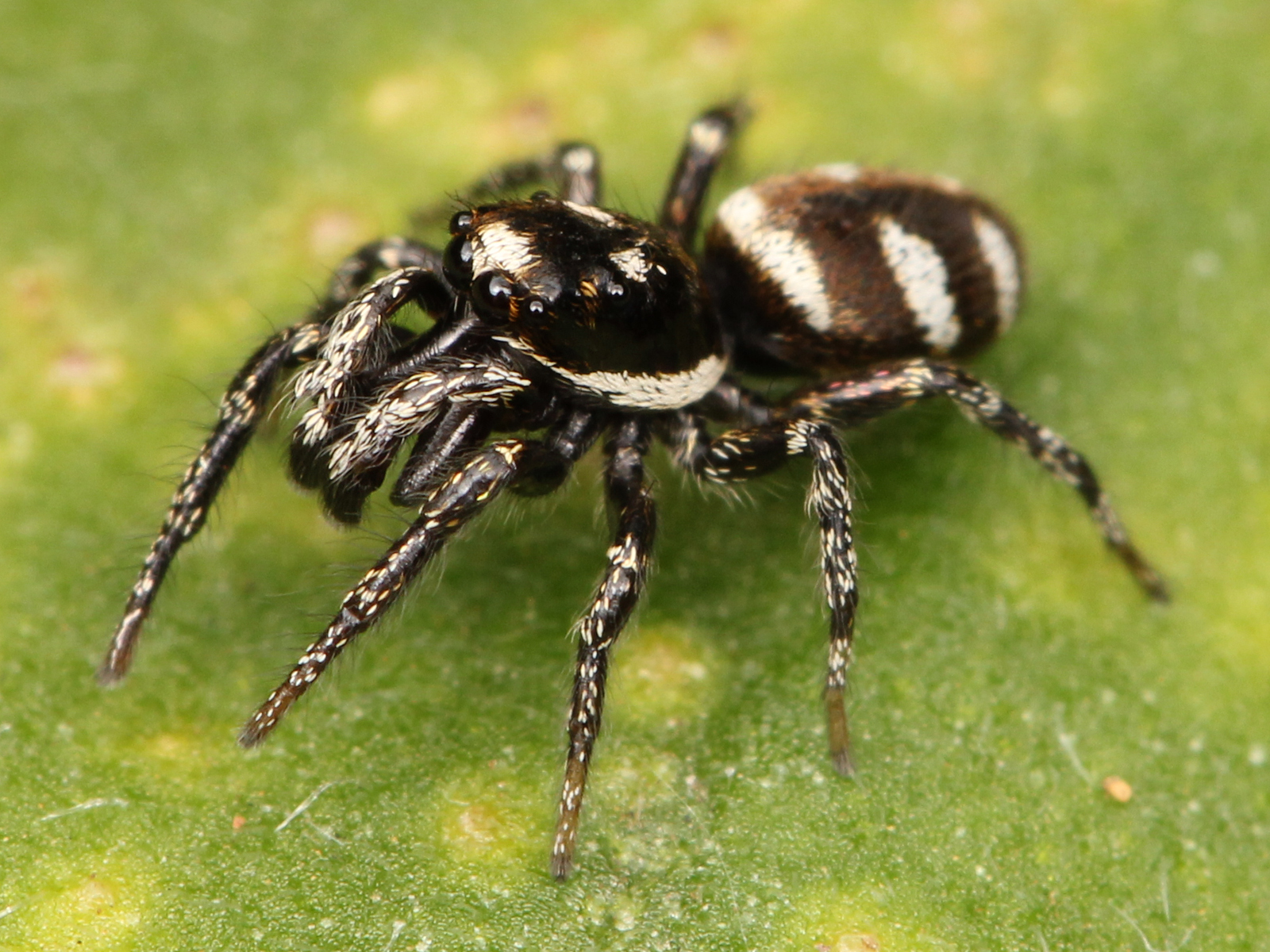
- Male zebra spider
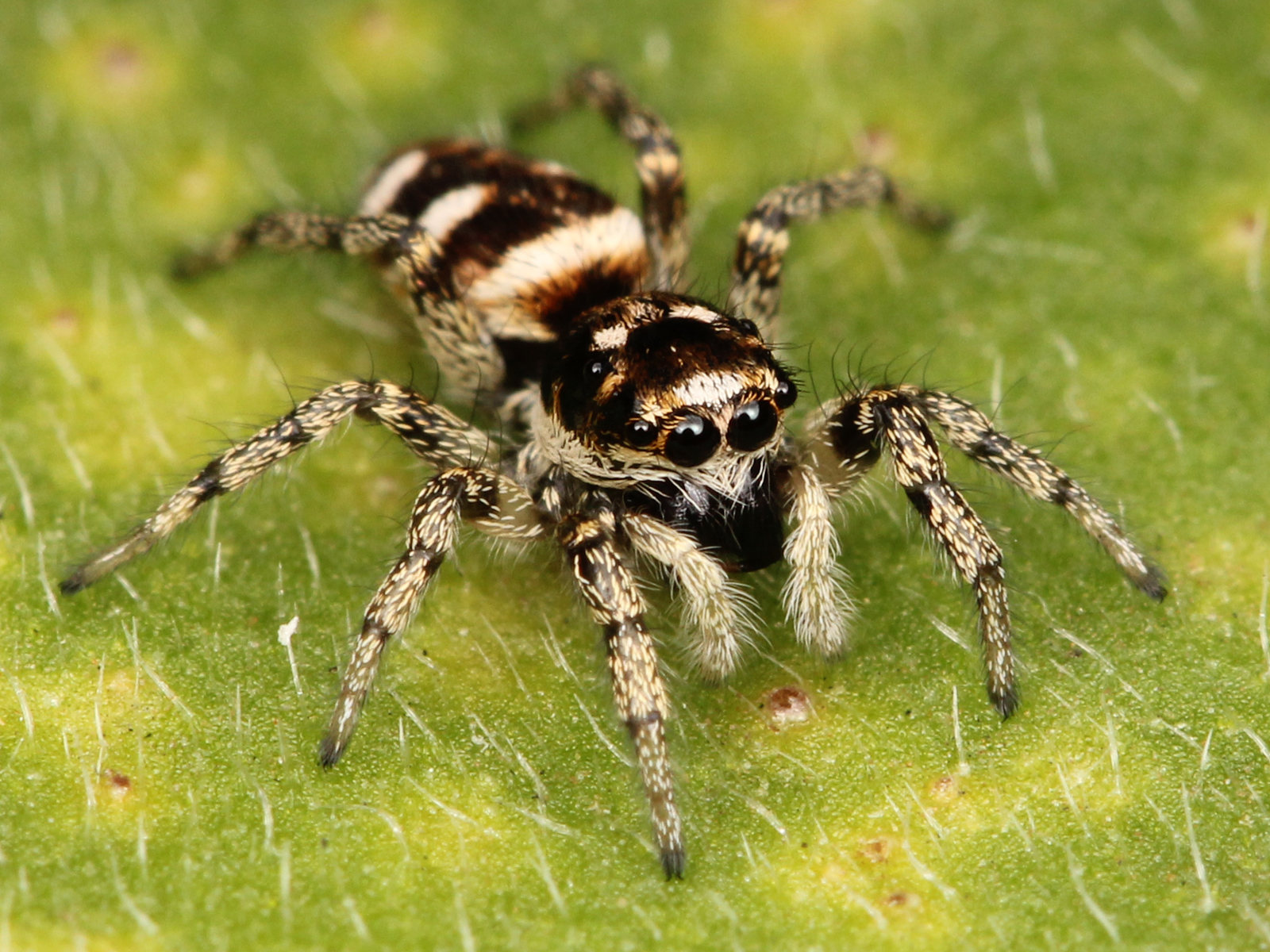
- Female zebra spider

Scientific classification
- Kingdom: Animalia
- Phylum: Arthropoda
- Subphylum: Chelicerata
- Class: Arachnida
- Order: Araneae
- Infraorder: Araneomorphae
- Family: Salticidae
- Genus: Salticus
- Species: S. scenicus

Binomial name
- Salticus scenicus (Clerck, 1757)

= Zebra spider =

Species of spider

The zebra spider (Salticus scenicus), zebra jumping spider or just zebra jumper is a common jumping spider of the Northern Hemisphere. The common name refers to its vivid black-and-white colouration. The scientific name derives from the Latin salticus, meaning 'jump', and the Greek scenicus, meaning 'theatrical' or 'of a decorative place', in reference to the flashy, zebra-like coloration of the species.

== Description ==
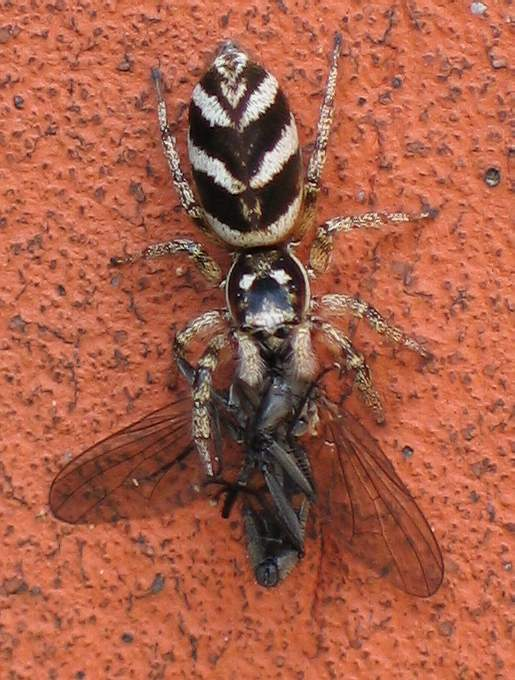
Zebra spider with a fly as prey

Female zebra spiders are 5–9 mm long, while males are 5–6 mm. Male zebra spiders have distinctly larger chelicerae than females. Spiders in the family Salticidae have especially enlarged anterior median eyes, though the anterior and posterior lateral eyes are also large when compared to the very small posterior median eyes. In total there are eight eyes, with the very large anterior median eyes primarily responsible for its excellent binocular vision. These small spiders are dark brown to black with white hairs that form stripes, often with a chevron-like shape.

== Distribution and habitat ==
Zebra spiders are widespread across Europe, North America, and North Asia, where they are found throughout the Holarctic.

This species is naturally associated with open habitats such as rock faces, shingle beaches and occasionally the trunks of trees. Due to their preference for open, vertical habitats they are often found living in proximity to humans in urban habitat such as on garden fences and the walls of buildings. Zebra spiders have also been known to enter houses, where they can often be found living in the corner of windowsills.

== Behaviour ==
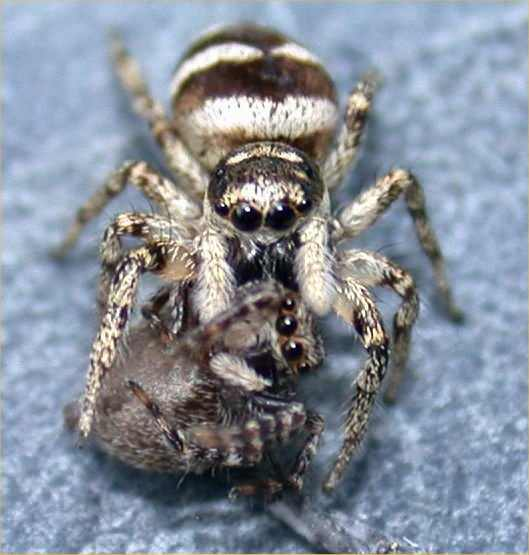
S. scenicus eating Attulus pubescens

=== Diet ===
Zebra spiders tend to hunt smaller spiders and other arthropods, especially fruit flies (within the first several instars.) They have been observed feeding on mosquitoes that are almost twice their length. They have also been observed taking on prey items up to 3 times the length of the spider, such as some of the smaller species of moth. Like other jumping spiders, these spiders use their large front eyes to locate and stalk their prey. They move slowly towards their prey until they are close enough to pounce on top of their victim, and their hunting behaviour has been described as cat-like. Using their sharp eyesight, they are able to accurately judge the distances they need to jump.

=== Hunting ===
Close-up of a zebra jumping spider eating a fly, with the four pairs of eyes clearly visible

Out walking or hunting, performing multiple jumps between objects.

They orient towards prey detected by their lateral eyes whenever the angle subtended by such prey exceeds 5.5°. The velocity of the prey is not involved in the determination of reactive distance, but only moving objects elicit orientation. The probability that orientation is followed by stalking is a function of both prey size and velocity. The zebra spider's stalk velocity declines progressively as it nears its (stationary) prey.

Before jumping, they glue a silk thread to the surface that they are jumping from so that if they miss the target, they can climb up the thread and try again - However, they may 'abseil' with a silk thread if they wish to descend from a height safely, for instance they have been documented 'abseiling' from ceilings. They ignore unappetising insects such as ants.

There are no extensor muscles at the 'hinge joints' of the spider leg; joint extension in the legs is controlled by haemocoelic blood pressure. The most significant evidence that this extension is due to hydraulic forces is that the leg spines become erect during the jump, a result of increased body pressure which can be demonstrated on many spiders. The zebra spider's jump is almost entirely due to the sudden straightening of the fourth pair of legs. The mean jumping velocity is estimated to be between 0.64–0.79 m/s (2.1–2.6 ft/s).

=== Reproduction ===
This species breeds during the spring and summer months. When a male and female spider meet, the male will conduct a courtship dance. The dance involves waving their front legs, pedipalps and moving their abdomen up and down. During the courtship dance males use their striped markings to signal that they wish to mate with the female. The courting ritual relies heavily on eyesight. The better the dance the more likely the female will want to mate. Males must be careful when approaching a female as they can risk being attacked or even mistaken as a prey species. If the female is impressed with the male's dance she will allow the male to approach. The female will crouch and allow the male to climb on top of her. Male spiders use a pair of leg-like appendages called pedipalps to transfer sperm to the female during the mating process. Females will stay with their egg sacs and will guard the young after they hatch. After the spiderlings have had their second moult they will leave the mother and fend for themselves.

== Taxonomic history ==
Salticus scenicus was one of the spiders included in Carl Alexander Clerck's 1757 work Svenska Spindlar / Aranei Suecici, the starting point for spider names in zoological nomenclature. Clerck originally called the species Araneus scenicus, and Carl Linnaeus, in the 1758 edition of Systema Naturae named it Aranea scenica; the specific epithet scenicus means "actor". Since then a number of synonyms have been published:

- Araneus scenicus
- Aranea scenica
- Aranea albo-fasciata
- Aranea fulvata
- Attus scenicus
- Attus candefactus
- Epiblemum faustum
- Attus scenicoides
- Calliethera histrionica
- Calliethera scenica
- Calliethera aulica
- Salticus albovittatus
- Attus histrionicus
- Callithera alpina
- Callietherus histrionicus
- Epiblemum histrionicum
- Salticus histrionicus
- Epiblemum scenicum
- Calliethera goberti
- Calliethera albovittata
