= Archaeodictyna minutissima =

Scientific classification
- Kingdom: Animalia
- Phylum: Arthropoda
- Subphylum: Chelicerata
- Class: Arachnida
- Order: Araneae
- Infraorder: Araneomorphae
- Family: Dictynidae
- Genus: Archaeodictyna
- Species: A. minutissima

Binomial name
- Archaeodictyna minutissima (Miller, 1958)

Species of spider

Archaeodictyna minutissima is a spider species found in Europe.
