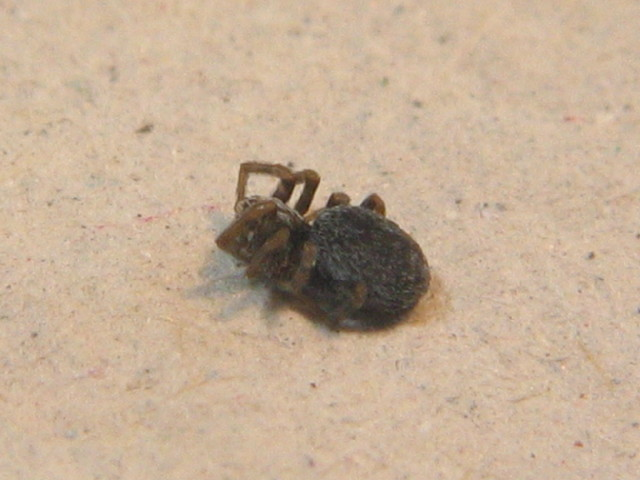
- Archaeodictyna ammophila, 30 May 2012

Scientific classification
- Kingdom: Animalia
- Phylum: Arthropoda
- Subphylum: Chelicerata
- Class: Arachnida
- Order: Araneae
- Infraorder: Araneomorphae
- Family: Dictynidae
- Genus: Archaeodictyna
- Species: A. ammophila

Binomial name
- Archaeodictyna ammophila (Menge, 1871)

= Archaeodictyna ammophila =

Species of spider

Archaeodictyna ammophila is a spider species found in Europe to Central Asia.
