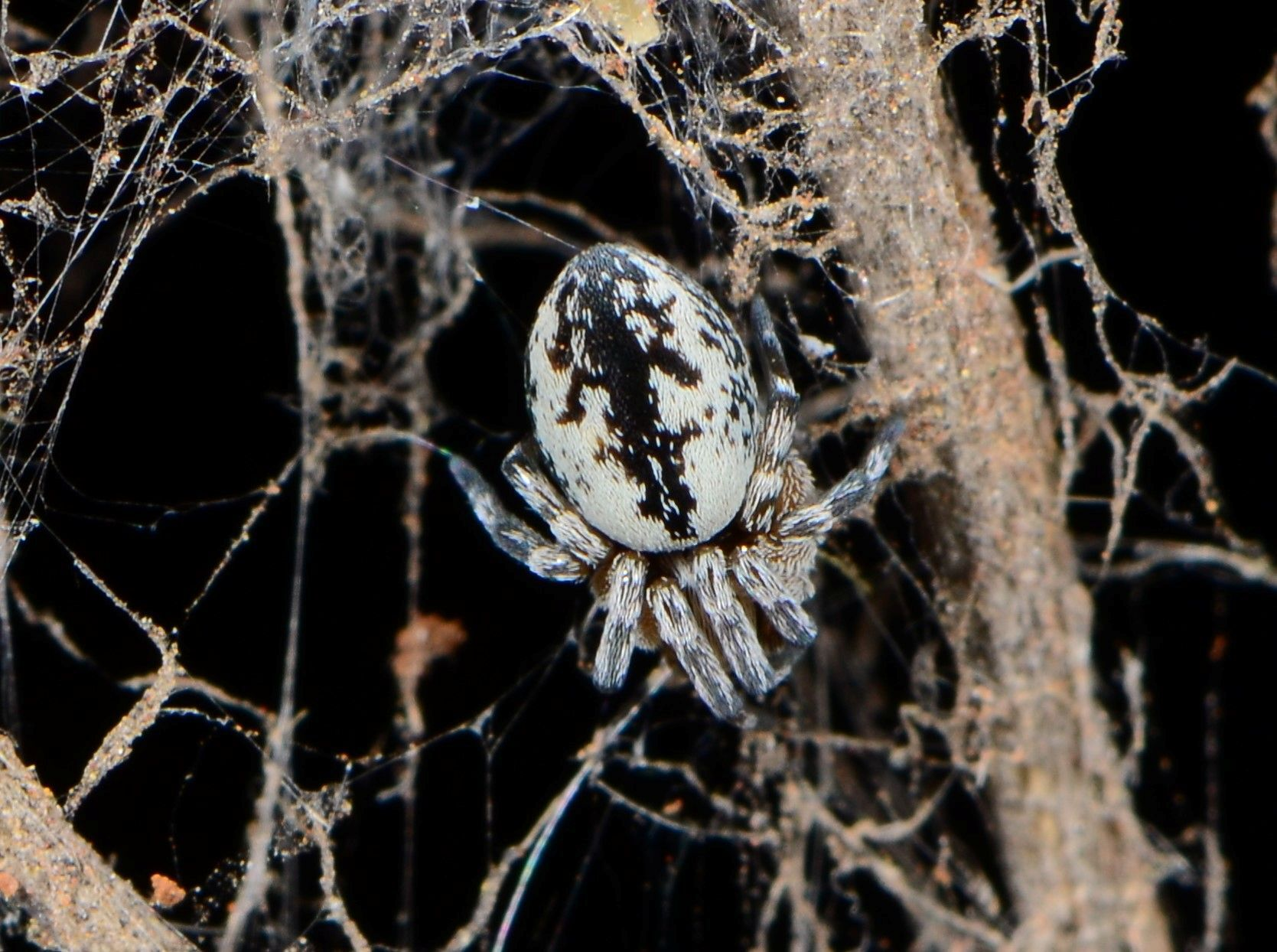
- Female A. condocta
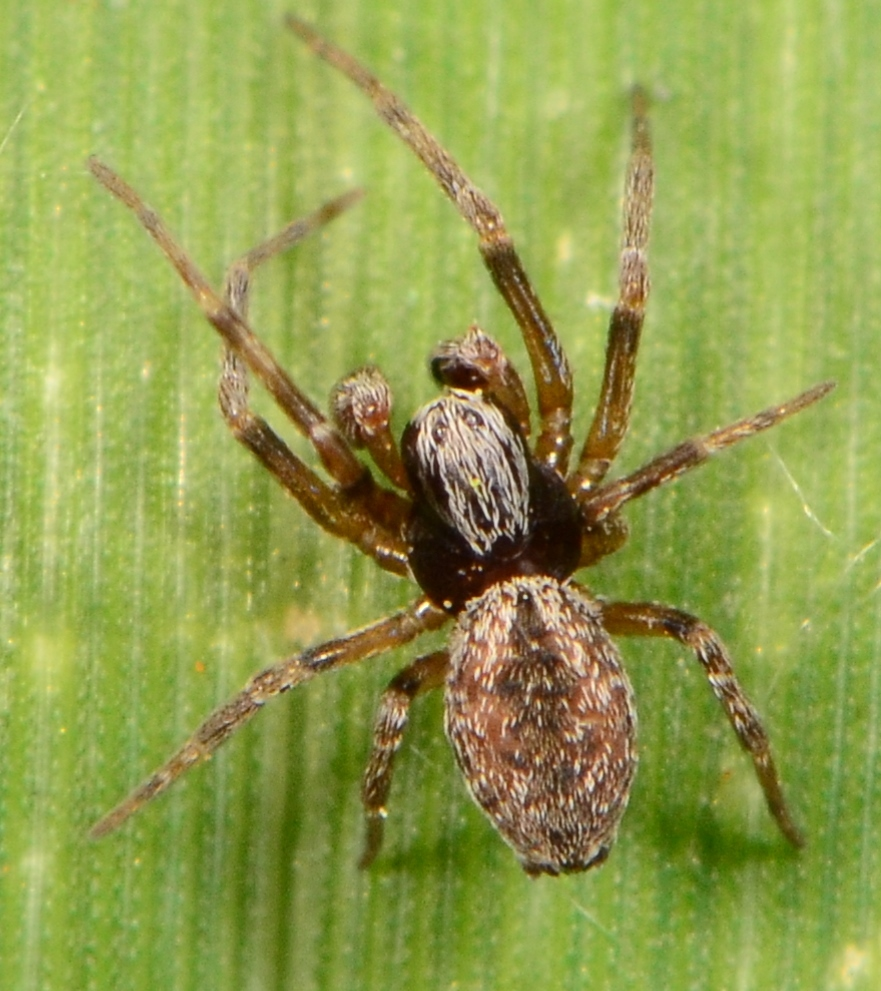
- Male A. condocta

Scientific classification
- Kingdom: Animalia
- Phylum: Arthropoda
- Subphylum: Chelicerata
- Class: Arachnida
- Order: Araneae
- Infraorder: Araneomorphae
- Family: Dictynidae
- Genus: Archaeodictyna; Caporiacco, 1928

Type species
- A. anguiniceps (Simon, 1899)

Species
- 9, see text

= Archaeodictyna =

Genus of spiders

Archaeodictyna is a genus of cribellate araneomorph spiders in the family Dictynidae, and was first described by Lodovico di Caporiacco in 1928.

== Species ==
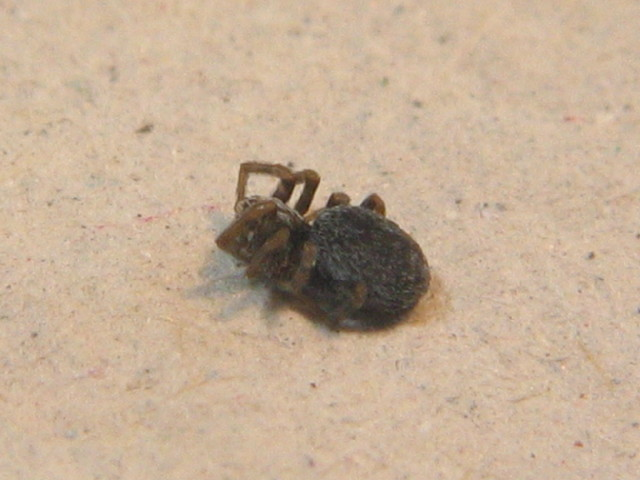
A. ammophila

As of September 2025 it contains 13 species: Archaeodictyna aguasverdes (Wunderlich, 2022) | m f | Canary Is.

- Archaeodictyna ammophila (Menge, 1871) – Europe to Central Asia
- Archaeodictyna anguiniceps (Simon, 1899) (type) – North, East Africa
- Archaeodictyna bispinosa (Simon, 1906) – Myanmar
- Archaeodictyna condocta (O. Pickard-Cambridge, 1876) – North Africa, Kazakhstan
- Archaeodictyna consecuta (O. Pickard-Cambridge, 1872) – Europe, Caucasus, Russia (Europe to South Siberia), Central Asia, China
- Archaeodictyna fuerteventurensis (Schmidt, 1976) – Canary Is.
- Archaeodictyna lanzarotensis (Wunderlich, 2022) – Canary Is.
- Archaeodictyna longichela Zamani & Marusik, 2025 – Iran
- Archaeodictyna minutissima (Miller, 1958) – Italy, Austria, Czechia, Slovakia, Ukraine, Russia (Europe)
- Archaeodictyna sexnotata (Simon, 1890) – Yemen
- Archaeodictyna suedicola (Simon, 1890) – Yemen
- Archaeodictyna tazzeiti (Denis, 1954) – Algeria
- Archaeodictyna ulova Griswold & Meikle-Griswold, 1987 – South Africa
