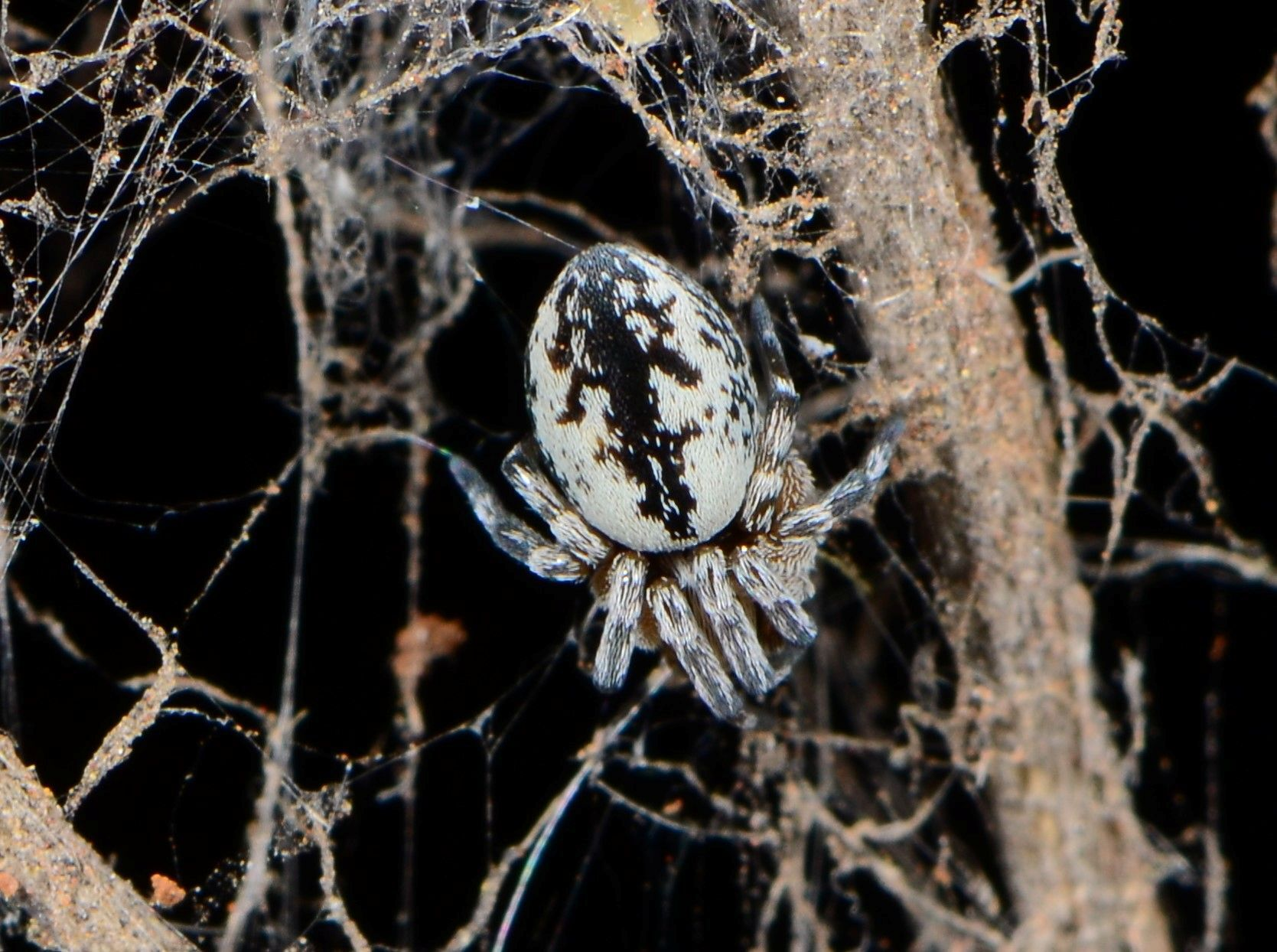
- White-and-black female Archaeodictyna condocta among dry silk.
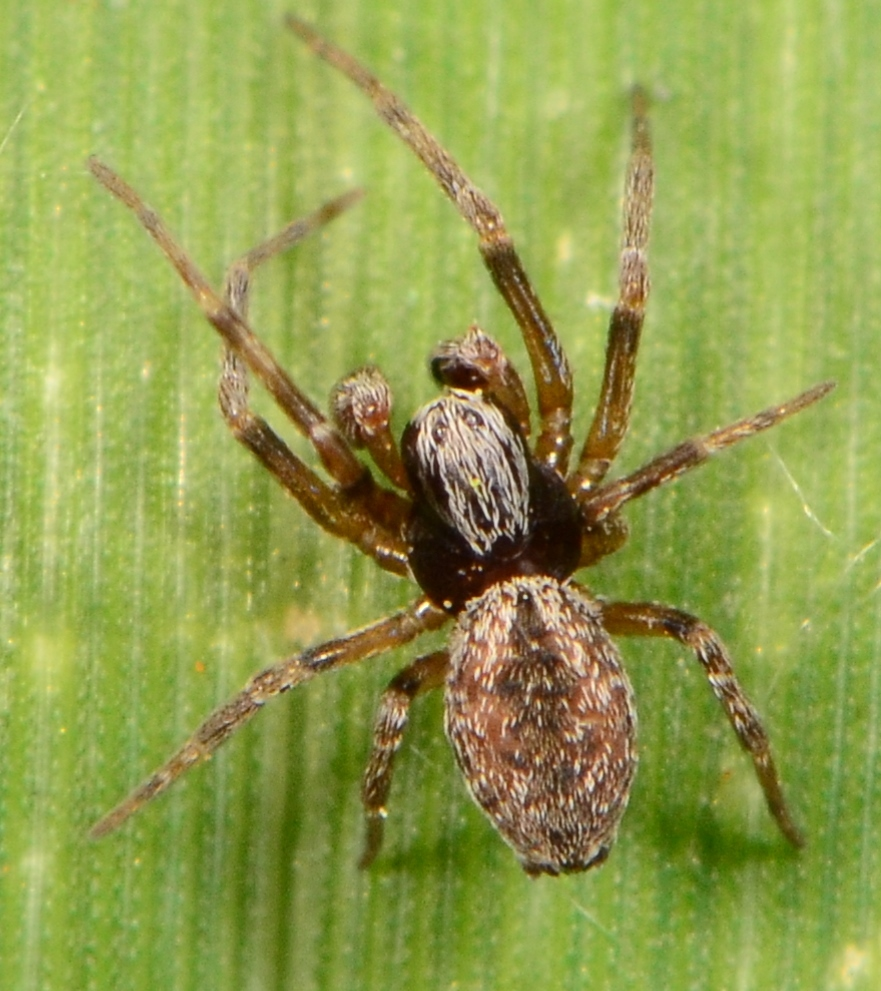
- Brown-phase, male Archaeodictyna condocta on a leaf.

Scientific classification
- Kingdom: Animalia
- Phylum: Arthropoda
- Subphylum: Chelicerata
- Class: Arachnida
- Order: Araneae
- Infraorder: Araneomorphae
- Family: Dictynidae
- Genus: Archaeodictyna
- Species: A. condocta

Binomial name
- Archaeodictyna condocta (O. Pickard-Cambridge, 1876)

Synonyms
- Dictyna olivacea Simon, 1885; Dictyna abyssinica Strand, 1906; Dictyna montana Tullgren, 1910; Dictyna sedilloti deserta Simon, 1911

= Archaeodictyna condocta =

Species of spider

Archaeodictyna condocta is a species of spider in the family Dictynidae. It is commonly known as the grass mesh-web spider.

== Distribution ==
Archaeodictyna condocta is found in North Africa, East Africa and Kazakhstan, and has been introduced to South Africa. In Egypt it has been recorded from Alexandria, Cairo, Lower Egypt and Suez. In South Africa, it is known from several localities in four provinces: Free State, Gauteng, Northern Cape, and Western Cape.

== Habitat and ecology ==
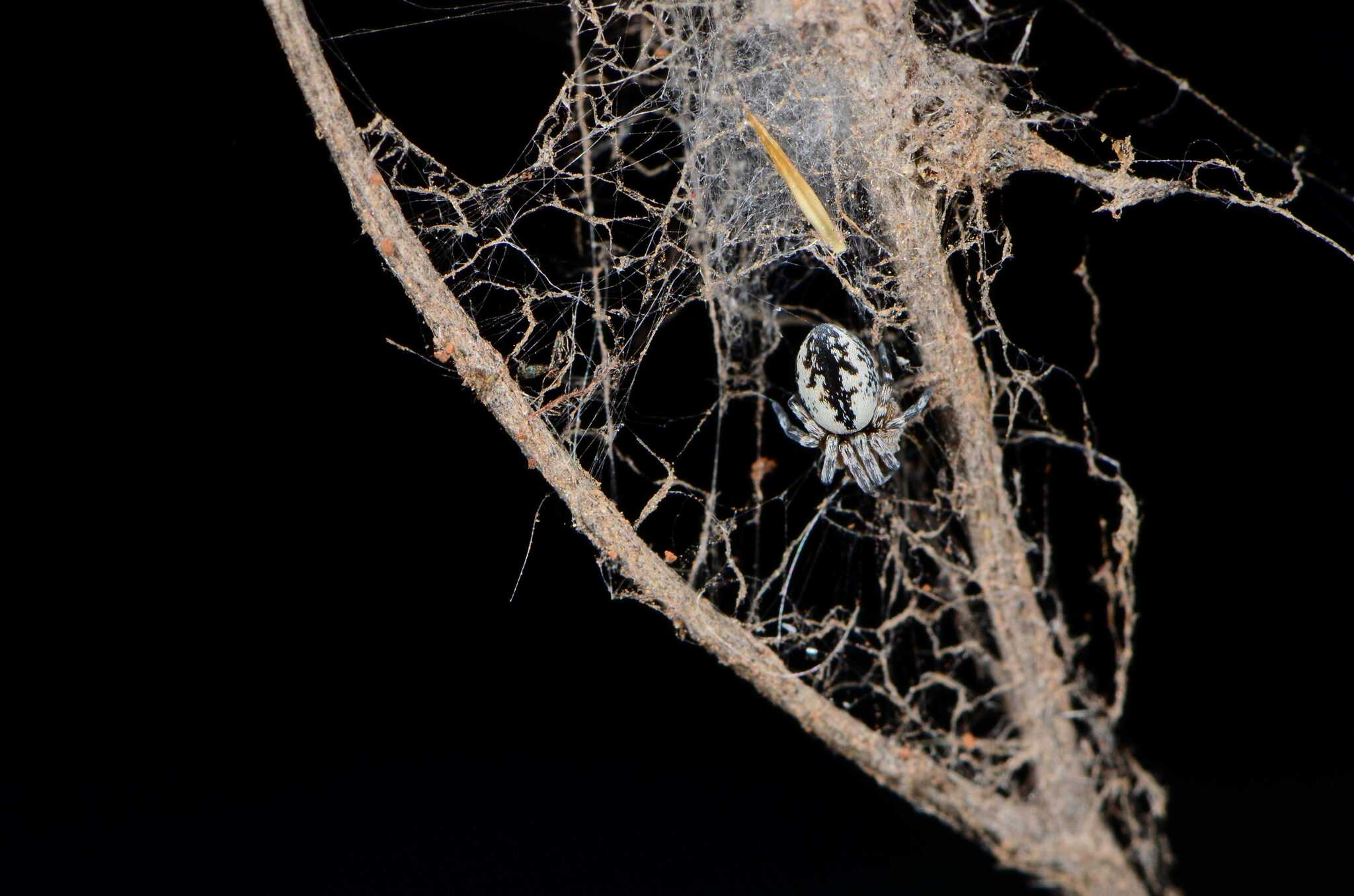
Female Archaeodictyna condocta in its tangled web on a dead twig.

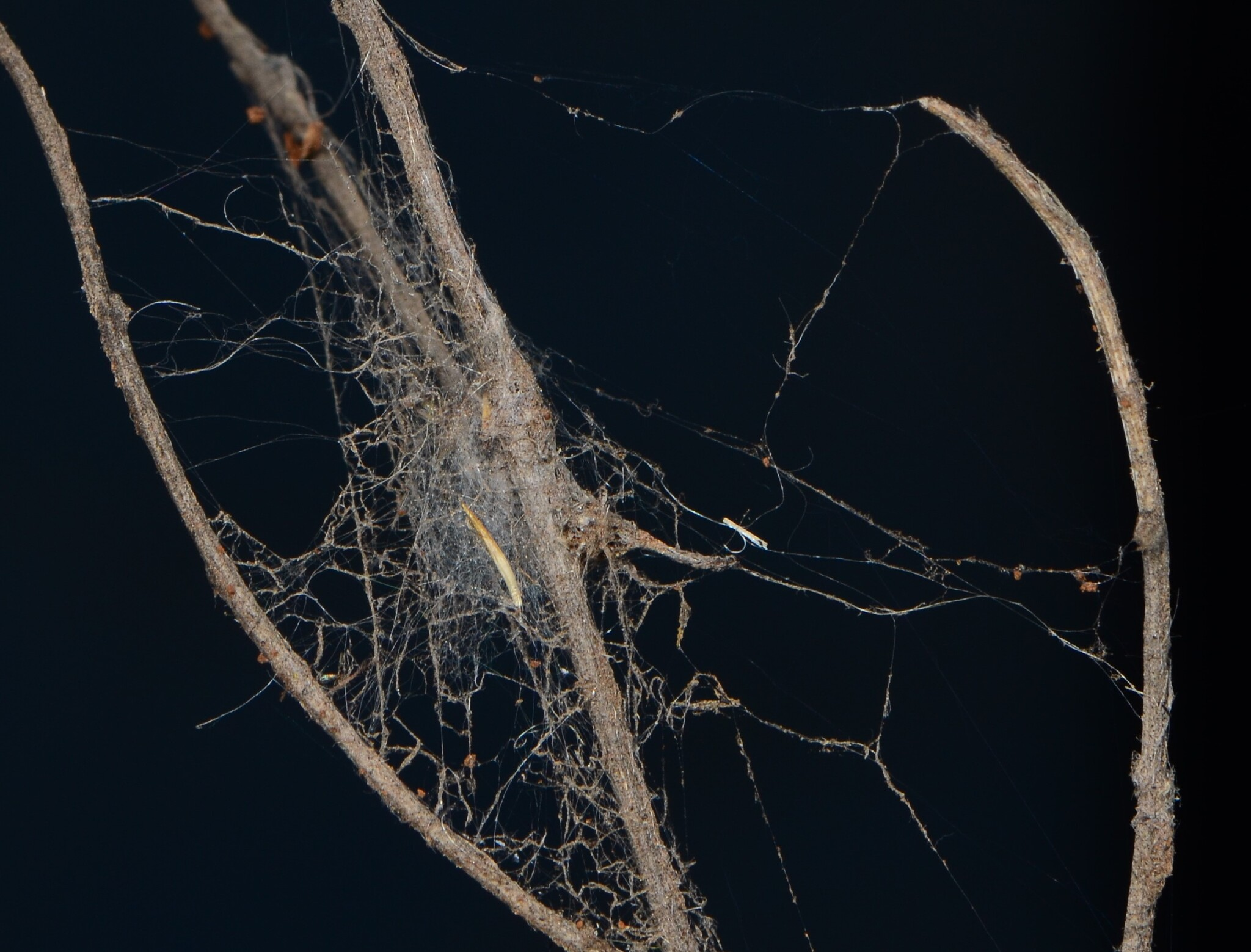
The irregular web of Archaeodictyna condocta.

The species is found at altitudes ranging from 84 to 1,316 m above sea level. Archaeodictyna condocta constructs retreat-webs on leaves, in crevices, or between twigs. The species has been recorded from various biomes but is more common in grassland and savanna.

== Description ==
Archaeodictyna condocta is known from both sexes. Like other species in this genus, they are small spiders; females measure 2 mm in body length and males 1.5 mm, with pale carapaces and pale, oval opisthosoma with dark brown to black markings for females and with dark brown carapaces and a more elongated and light brown opisthosoma for males.

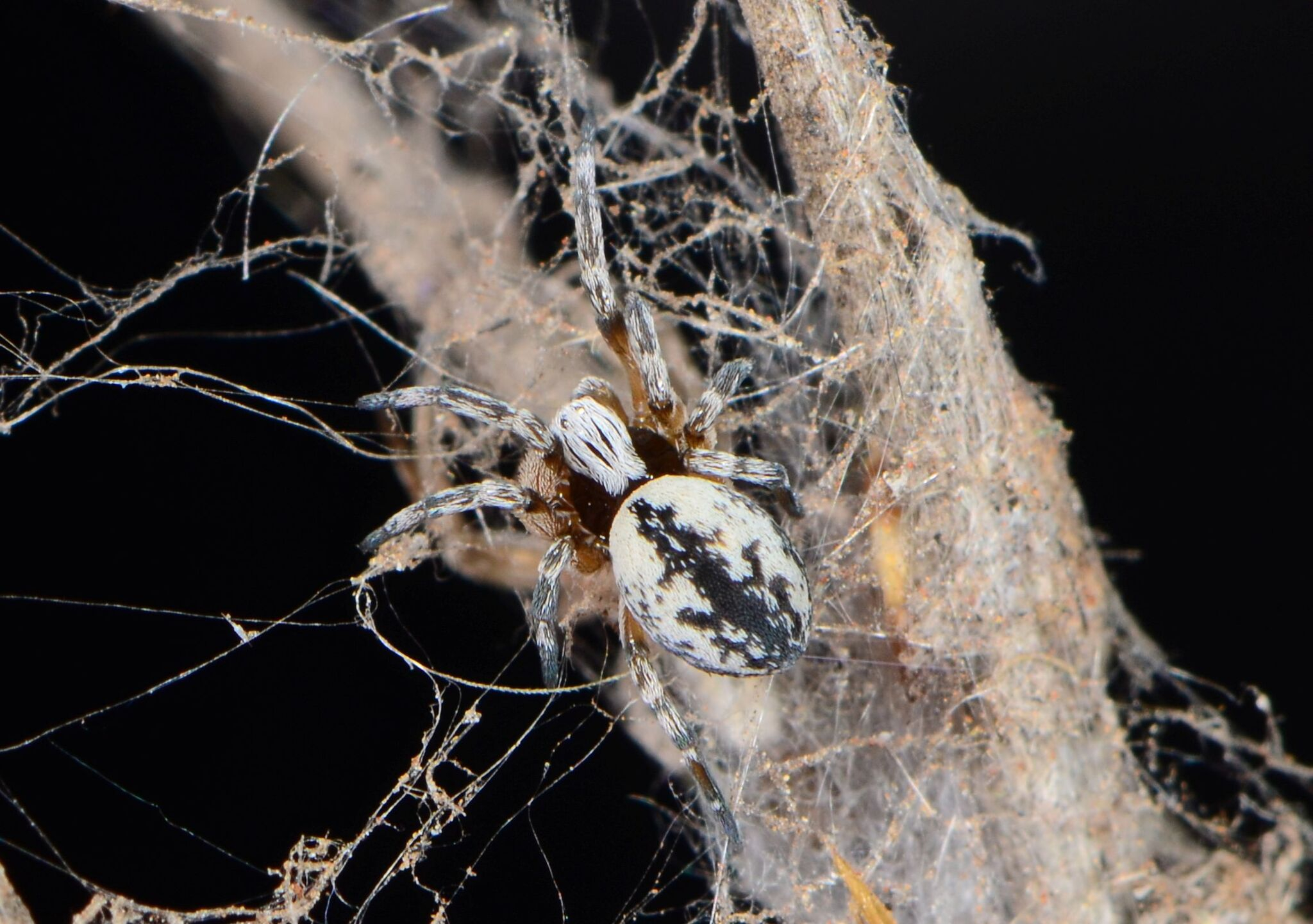
Female Archaeodictyna condocta resting in its silk retreat.

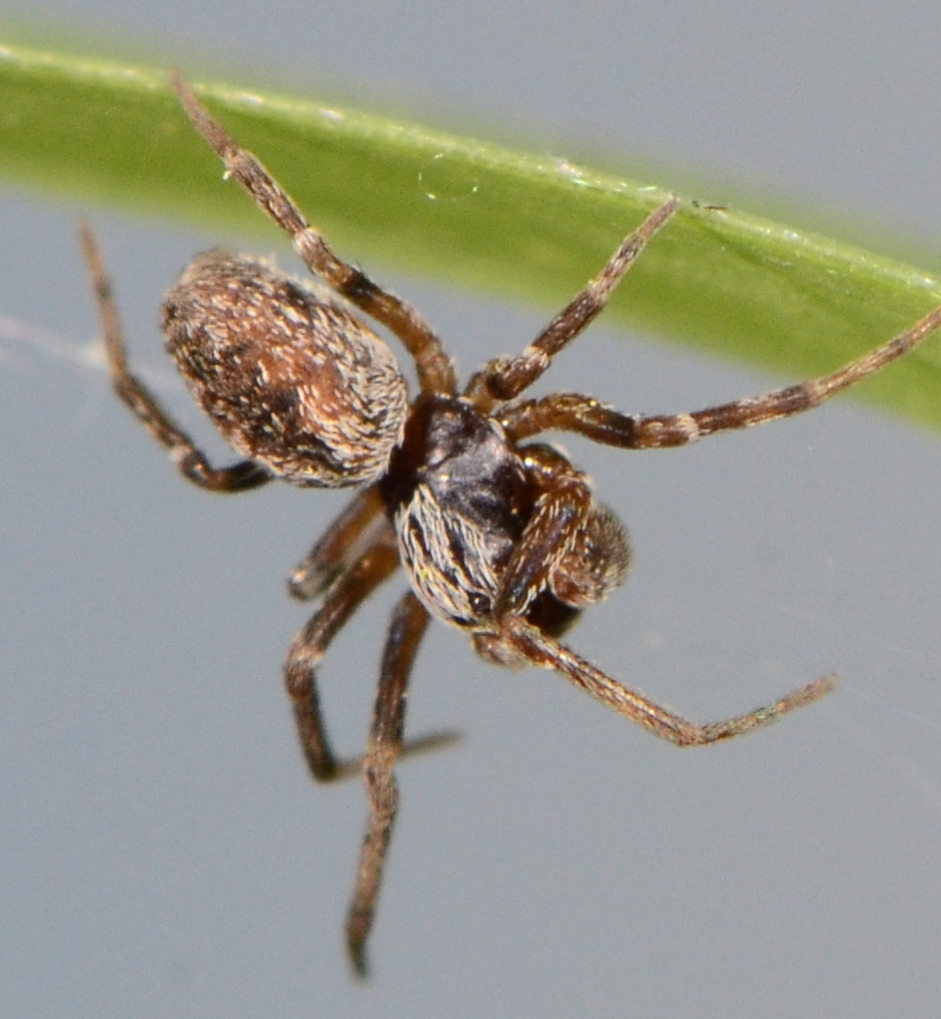
Brown-phase male Archaeodictyna condocta on a grass blade.

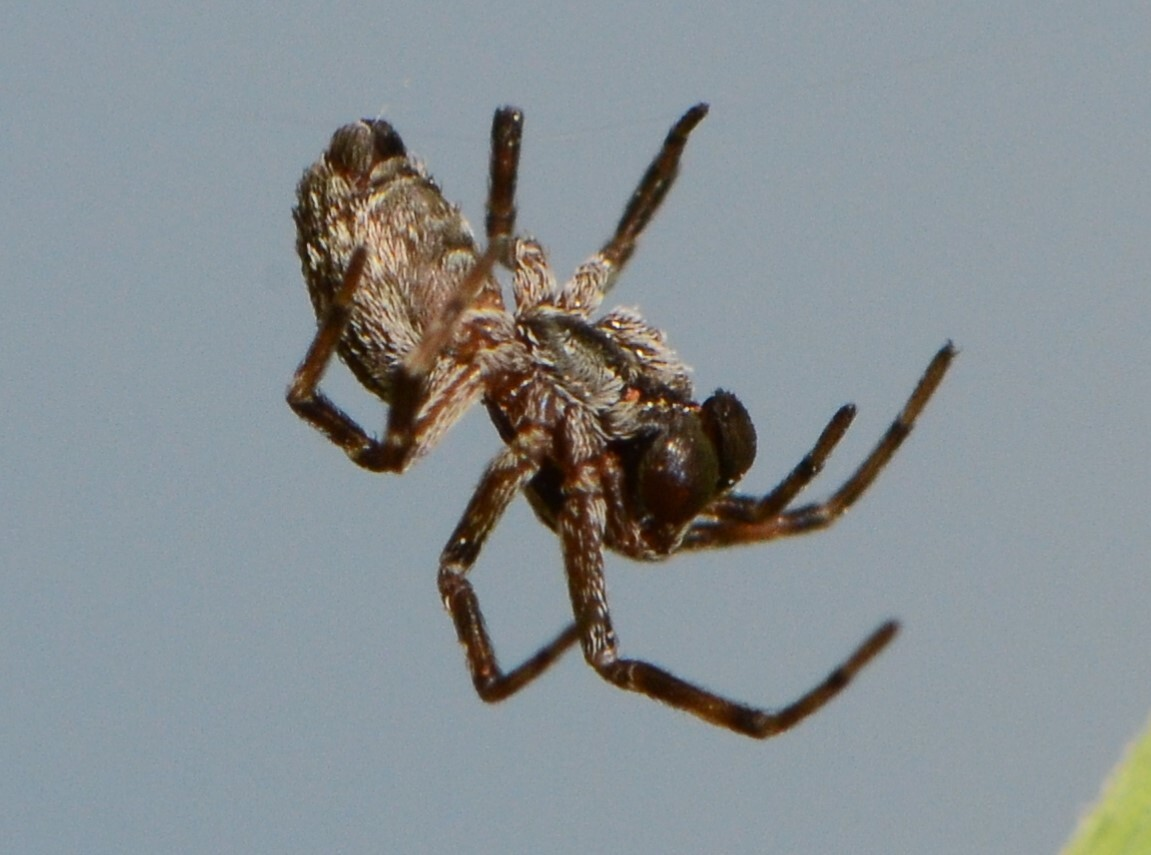
Male Archaeodictyna condocta, seen from below.

== Conservation ==
Archaeodictyna condocta is listed as Least Concern by the South African National Biodiversity Institute due to its wide distribution range. The species is protected in two reserves: Tswalu Game Reserve and Rooipoort Nature Reserve.

== Taxonomy ==
The species was first described by O. Pickard-Cambridge in 1876 as Dictyna condocta, in a paper cataloguing spiders collected in Egypt. It was later transferred to the genus Archaeodictyna by Lehtinen in 1967, who also synonymized several other species with A. condocta, including Dictyna abyssinica, D. montana, D. pygmaea, and D. sedilloti deserta.
