= Archaeodictyna ulova =

Conservation status
- Least Concern (SANBI Red List)

Scientific classification
- Kingdom: Animalia
- Phylum: Arthropoda
- Subphylum: Chelicerata
- Class: Arachnida
- Order: Araneae
- Infraorder: Araneomorphae
- Family: Dictynidae
- Genus: Archaeodictyna
- Species: A. ulova

Binomial name
- Archaeodictyna ulova Griswold & Meikle-Griswold, 1987

Species of spider

Archaeodictyna ulova is a species of spider in the family Dictynidae. It is commonly known as the ulova mesh-web sider and is endemic to South Africa.

== Distribution ==
Archaeodictyna ulova is known from three South African provinces: Eastern Cape, KwaZulu-Natal, and Limpopo. The species occurs at altitudes ranging from 37 to 1,742 m above sea level.

== Habitat and ecology ==
The species has been sampled from grass and herb layers in grassland, thicket and savanna biomes. Archaeodictyna ulova exhibits an unusual lifestyle as a kleptoparasite in the community nests of the eresid spiders Stegodyphus mimosarum and S. dumicola, feeding communally with their hosts on prey items caught by the eresids.

== Description ==
Archaeodictyna ulova is known from both sexes.

== Conservation ==
Archaeodictyna ulova is listed as Least Concern by the South African National Biodiversity Institute due to its wide geographic range. The species is protected in Addo National Park and Kruger National Park.
