= American Nations =

Non-fiction book by Colin Woodard

American Nations: A History of the Eleven Rival Regional Cultures of North America
- Cover of American Nations
- Author: Colin Woodard
- Language: English
- Published: 2011
- Publisher: Viking
- Publication place: United States
- Media type: Print
- ISBN: 978-0-670-02296-0
- Website: colinwoodard.com/americannations.html

American Nations: A History of the Eleven Rival Regional Cultures of North America is an American non-fiction book written by Colin Woodard and published in 2011. Woodard proposes a framework for examining American history and current events based on a view of the country as a federation of eleven nations, each defined by a shared culture established by each nation's founding population.

Noting that the original Thirteen Colonies were established at different times and by different groups with different goals and values, Woodard shows how these colonies both cooperated and competed from their founding. The principles held dear by each colony often conflicted with those of other colonies, and those conflicting agendas shaped the founding and growth of the United States. As the country expanded, the populace that moved into the new territory brought with it the culture of the society from which they came, resulting in nations – a group that shares a common culture and origin – divorced from legal state and international boundaries. American Nations argues that the contrasts between regional cultures, as opposed to state or national borders, provide a more useful and accurate explanation of events and movements.

Woodard has written two sequels: American Character: A History of the Epic Struggle Between Individual Liberty and the Common Good (Viking, 2016) and Union: The Struggle to Forge the Story of United States Nationhood (Viking, 2020). He has referred to them as an "informal American Nations trilogy."

== The eleven nations ==
Of the nations, Woodard explains, "It isn’t that residents of one or another nation all think the same, but rather that they are all embedded within a cultural framework of deep-seated preferences and attitudes – each of which a person may like or hate, but has to deal with nonetheless."

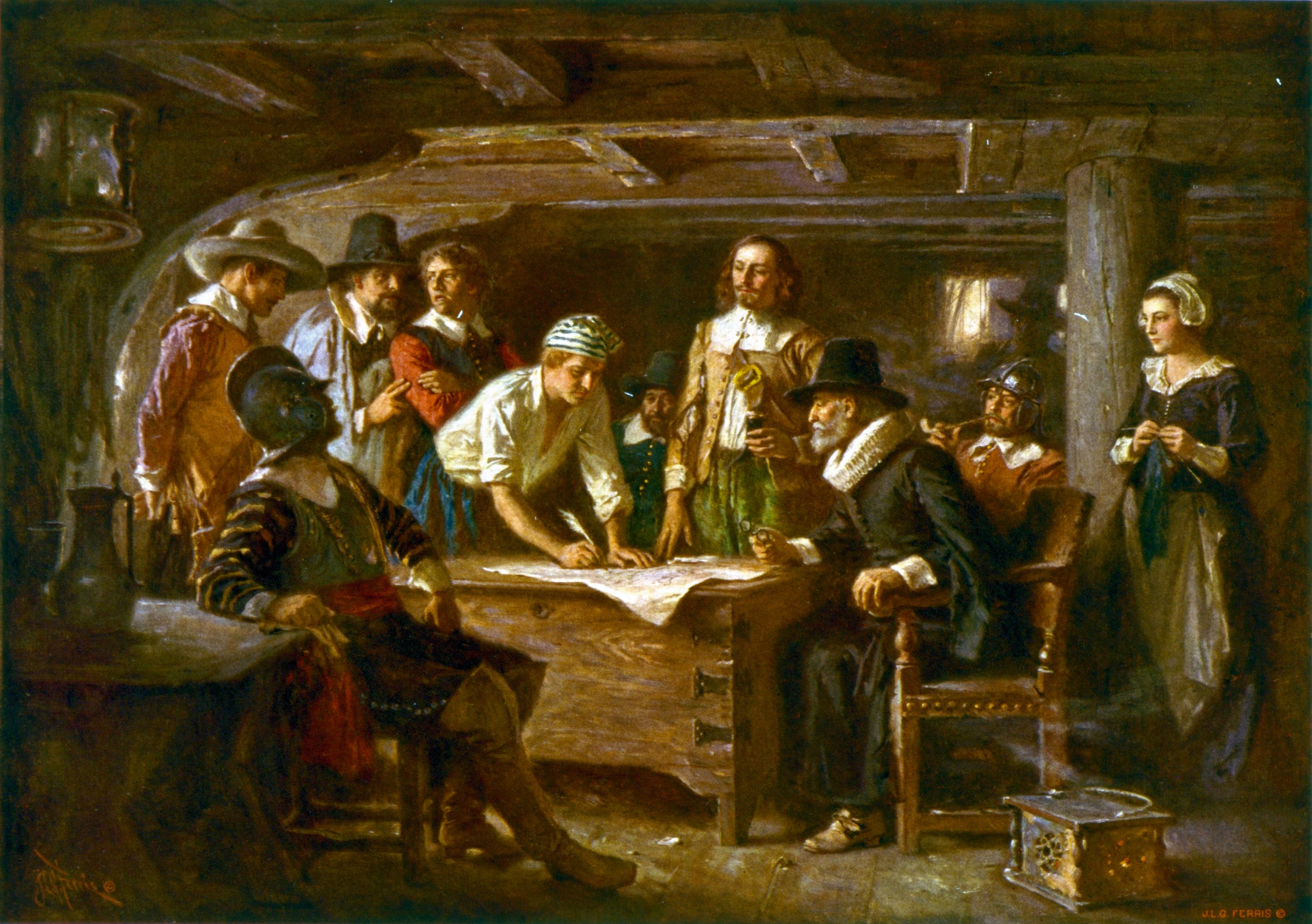
The Mayflower Compact, 1620

- Yankeedom began with the Puritans (Calvinist English settlers) in New England and spread across upstate New York, the northern parts of Pennsylvania, Ohio, Indiana, Illinois, and Iowa, into the eastern Dakotas, Michigan, Wisconsin, Minnesota, and the Canadian Maritimes. The area values education, communal decision-making, broad participation in democracy, the assimilation of outsiders to Yankee values, and aims at creating a religious utopian communal society to be spread over other regions.
- Deep South was settled by former Anglo-American West Indies plantation owners in Charleston, and spread to encompass the lowlands of South Carolina, Georgia, Alabama, Mississippi, Louisiana, West Tennessee, northern and central Florida, the southeastern corner of North Carolina, the southern half of Arkansas, and the eastern woods of Texas. It has valued old Greco-Roman enlightened, civilized, idle slave society, the free market and individualism. It has fought centuries with Yankeedom over the control of America’s destiny, such as in the Civil War and the "culture wars" started by the civil rights movement since the 1960s. Though the Deep South’s caste system (which put rich white Protestants at the top, poor white Protestants and all non-Protestant whites in the middle, and African Americans at the bottom regardless of social status) was crushed by intervention from northern nations, it continues to fight against progressive reforms such as LGBTQ+ rights, taxes on capital and the wealthy, and business regulations.
- New Netherland, established by Dutch colonists in the 17th century, is now Greater New York City, as well as the lower Hudson Valley, northern New Jersey, western Long Island, and southwestern Connecticut. Long a destination for immigrants, this region, with its global commercial culture, promotes liberal, multicultural values, capitalism and the freedom of the press.

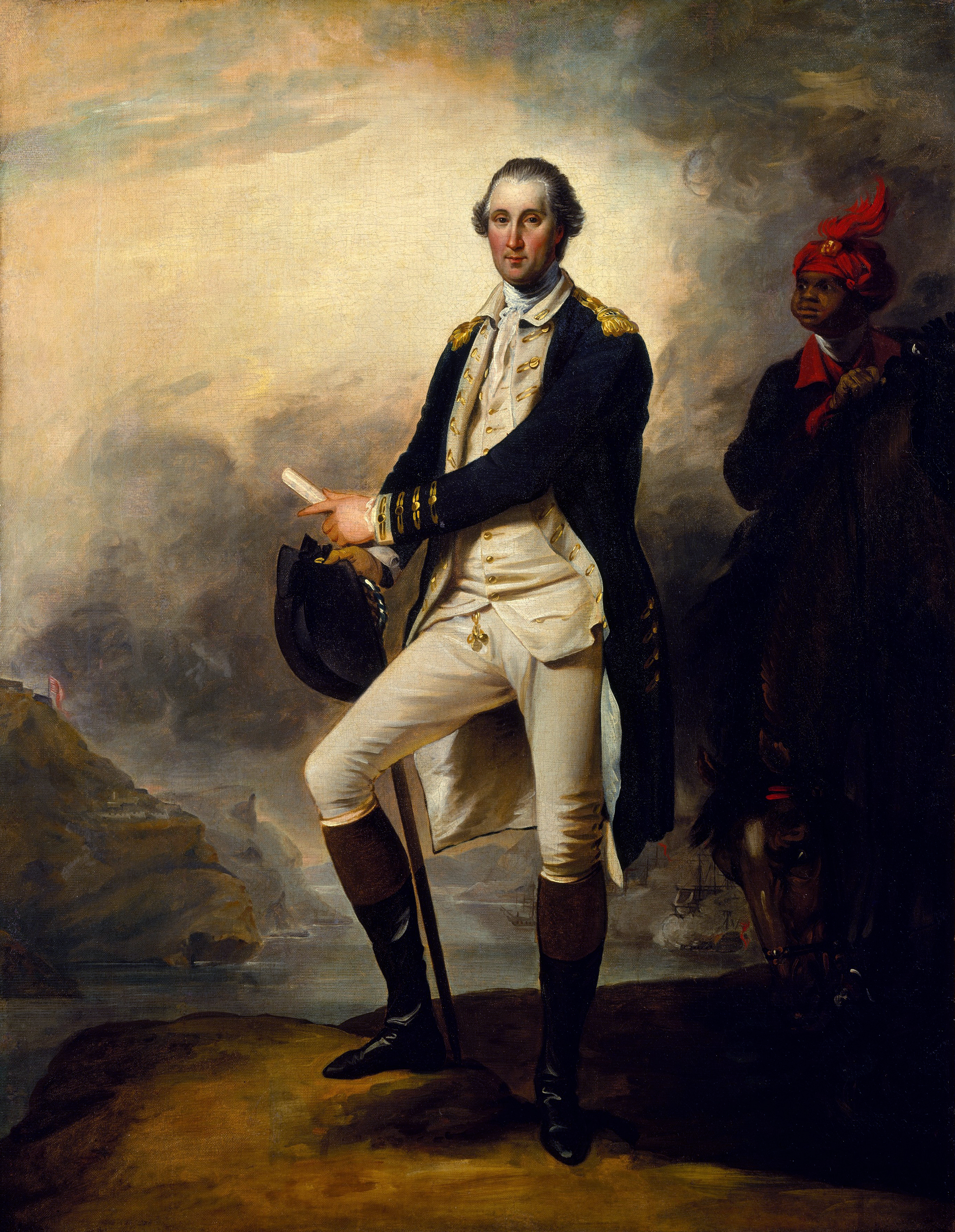
George Washington by John Trumbull (1780)

- Tidewater was founded by Cavaliers (Royalists during the era of the English Civil War and Stuart Restoration), and consists of eastern Virginia, Maryland (around Chesapeake Bay), southern Delaware, and northeastern North Carolina. Has cooperated often with Deep South and Greater Appalachia. Together with George Washington, many of the Founding Fathers came from here. Appalachian Mountains cut its expansion westwards, and the region is now being overrun by the Midlands.
- Greater Appalachia was populated by waves of immigrants that Woodard calls Borderlanders, from the borders of Northern Ireland, northern England, and the Scottish Lowlands. Greater Appalachia covers the highlands of the American South including Kentucky, most of Tennessee, West Virginia, and the western parts of Virginia and North Carolina, the southern parts of Ohio, Indiana, and Illinois, the Ozarks of Arkansas and Missouri, most of Oklahoma, and Texas Hill Country. Its fighting spirit is embodied by figures such as Davy Crockett, Andrew Jackson and Douglas MacArthur. This is a culture known for its warrior ethic, and a commitment to individualism.
- Midlands, founded by English Quakers followed by the Pennsylvania Dutch, consists of southeast Pennsylvania, southern New Jersey, northern Delaware and Maryland, central Ohio, Indiana and Illinois, northern Missouri, most of Iowa, and the eastern halves of South Dakota, Nebraska, and Kansas, as well as southern Ontario and southeastern Manitoba. The border city of Chicago is shared with Yankeedom and St. Louis with Greater Appalachia. Midlands promotes peaceful values and has often been in several elections the great swing-region between Yankeedom and the Southern Nations, rejecting top-down government and strong ideology. According to Woodard it is culturally the most "American" of the nations.
- New France began in 1604 with an expedition from France led by Pierre Dugua. It grew to encompass the lower third of Quebec, north and northeast New Brunswick, and southern Louisiana.

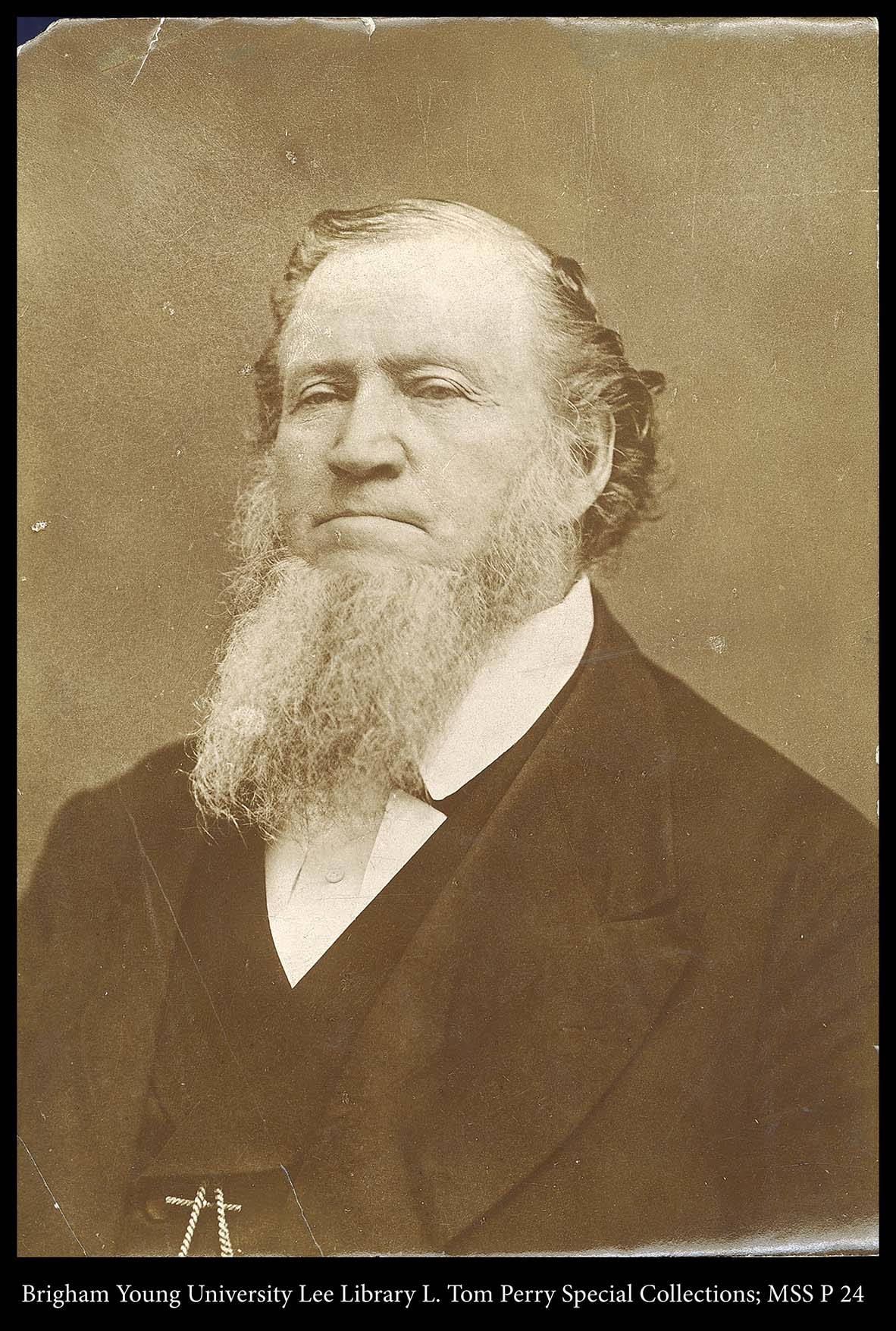
Brigham Young bust portrait

- El Norte is where the oldest European subculture in the United States is found, from the early Catholic Spanish settlers in the 16th century. Later augmented by Anglo-Americans from the Deep South, Midlands, and Greater Appalachia, it includes south Texas, southern California and its Imperial Valley, southern Arizona, most of New Mexico, parts of southern Colorado, and the Mexican states of Tamaulipas, Nuevo León, Coahuila, Chihuahua, Sonora, and Baja California.
- Far West is the interior of the United States and Canada west of the 100th meridian between El Norte and First Nation. It includes the interiors of California, Oregon, and Washington, much of British Columbia, Alberta, Saskatchewan, Manitoba, Colorado, and Alaska, part of the Yukon, the west halves of the Dakotas, Nebraska, and Kansas, as well as all of Idaho, Montana, Wyoming, Utah, and Nevada. The region had been "imperialized" and made habitable to non-Natives by other nations, such as Yankeedom, the Midlands, and Greater Appalachia, with large mining and infrastructure projects, such as railroads, dams, and irrigation systems. The Far West has felt alienated by the governments of the US and Canada, as they feel they’ve been exploited as an internal colony for the benefit of eastern nations. The Mormon Enclave has been its politically most influential group.
- Left Coast was predominantly settled by Yankees from New England, with a huge influx from Greater Appalachia and countries around the world when gold was discovered. It encompasses the land between the Pacific Ocean and the Pacific Coast Ranges from Monterey, California to Juneau, Alaska, containing parts of California, Oregon, Washington, British Columbia, and Alaska. It is an ideological ally with Yankeedom, combining the Yankee ideals of social reform, education, and a strong democracy with the Appalachian ideals of exploration, self-expression, and personal freedom.
- First Nation, founded by the predominant indigenous peoples in Canada south of the Arctic Circle, consists of much of Yukon, Northwest Territories, Labrador, Nunavut, Greenland, the far northern tiers of Ontario, Manitoba, Saskatchewan, and Alberta, and the northern two-thirds of Quebec. The Natives of this region have never given up their land to settlers by treaty. In recent times, this nation has regained its sovereignty by winning autonomy in Alaska and Nunavut, and a self-governing nation-state in Greenland.

After publication of the book, Woodard later expanded his map to cover Canada, the Caribbean, and the Pacific, with an additional three nations:

- Spanish Caribbean, consisting of Southern Florida, Cuba, the Dominican Republic, and Puerto Rico, was created by the Spaniards as part of their maritime commercial empire centered in Havana, and is culturally distinct from El Norte and the Mayan and Aztec cultures of central and southern Mexico and Central America.
- Greater Polynesia was one of the last places on Earth settled by humans. First settled by Polynesians, it encompasses Hawai’i, French Polynesia, the Cook Islands, Samoa, and Tonga.
- Anglo-Irish, taking the status of the oldest Euro-American colonizer-settler culture from El Norte, was settled by British and Irish people, and is predominantly Celtic in culture, with an emphasis on egalitarianism and communitarianism and an awareness of their distinctiveness compared to the rest of Canada as a separate Dominion before 1949. It occupies Newfoundland and southern Labrador.

== The alliances ==
American Nations contends that, on most matters, two major alliances of nations are commonly opposed to each other: the northern alliance of Yankeedom, the New Netherland and the Left Coast, and the southern alliance of the Deep South, Greater Appalachia, and Tidewater (though Tidewater has aligned with the Northern coalition in recent years). The remaining nations - Midlands, New France, El Norte, and Far West - generally swing individually toward the views of either alliance, depending on the issue. The positions of those "swing" nations determine shifts in the balance of power in the US. For example, the southern alliance is reliably in favor of foreign wars and the northern alliance is generally opposed.

== Reception ==
James M. Rubenstein, professor of geography at Miami University, criticizes the generalizations about the cultures, yet says Woodard's "fundamental point is sound".

Writing for the journal The Social Contract, Michael Masters takes issue with some of the book's perspectives on history, particularly Woodard's description of the Bill of Rights being based on the Articles of Capitulation on the Reduction of New Netherland, and contends that American Nations fails to adequately address the vast numbers of later immigrants.

A starred review in Kirkus concludes, "Woodard offers a fascinating way to parse American (writ large) politics and history in this excellent book."

MarketWatch, examining the book in the context of the 2013 Virginia gubernatorial election, says "Woodard’s redrawn map is winning fans who see it as providing some fresh insight into what is going on in American politics."

The Green Papers observes that while both American Nations and the earlier The Nine Nations of North America by Joel Garreau correctly note that cultures of states are "not so easily shoe-horned" into the regions to which they are typically assigned and that the influences of these cultures transcend international boundaries into Mexico and Canada, the reality is that Congressional representatives and senators are elected by states.

A reviewer for the Portland, Maine Press Herald calls Woodard's arguments compelling and the book well-written and superb. Noting the similarity to The Nine Nations of North America, the reviewer points out that Garreau's framework is more about economic factors where American Nations is about "adherence to ideas and approaches to doing things." He questions the absence of southern Florida and the Caribbean, and Hawaii and the Pacific.

The Washington Post calls it "a compelling and informative attempt to make sense of the regional divides in North America in general and this country in particular", noting how American Nations builds on the foundation of David Hackett Fischer's Albion's Seed and addresses immigration and mobility with the argument that new arrivals adapt to the existing cultures. The review, like others, identifies a bias in Yankee Woodard's characterizations of Deep South.

The Wall Street Journal compares American Nations to Albion's Seed and The Nine Nations and concludes, "Mr. Woodard's approach is breezier than Mr. Fischer's and more historical than Mr. Garreau's, but he has earned a place on the shelf between them", yet identifies "enough annoying errors to make one wary of its often original analysis".

== See also ==
- Albion's Seed
- Political culture of the United States
- The Nine Nations of North America, a 1981 book written by Joel Garreau that focuses on nations similar to Colin Woodard's American Nations
- Wilbur Zelinsky
