= Blue wall (United States) =

States that consistently vote for the Democratic Party in U.S. elections

The "blue wall" states all voted for the Democratic presidential nominee in every election since 1992, while the light blue states voted for Donald Trump in 2016 and 2024.

The blue wall is a term coined in 2009 in the political culture of the United States to refer to the 18 states (along with Washington, D.C.) that consistently voted blue (i.e., for the Democratic Party) in the six consecutive presidential elections from 1992 to 2012. This trend suggested a fundamental dominance in presidential politics for the Democratic Party. Conversely, the term red sea is used to refer to states that Republicans consistently won in the same time frame. States which have not voted consistently for one party are called purple, or swing states.

During the 2016 presidential election, Democratic nominee Hillary Clinton was considered a heavy favorite to win the electoral college because of this trend, but Republican nominee Donald Trump challenged the strength of the "blue wall" Rust Belt states of Michigan, Pennsylvania, and Wisconsin, which became swing states in the next three elections. The Trump victories in 2016 and 2024 to win the electoral college included narrowly flipping these three states, while in 2020, Democratic nominee Joe Biden won the presidency by narrowly carrying all three states with lower than three percent margins.

The Southern United States had previously voted Democratic so reliably that it had been termed the "Solid South" until Republicans implemented the Southern strategy. The last Democratic presidential nominee to win a majority of Southern states was Jimmy Carter in 1976.

== Origin ==
Ronald Brownstein claims to have coined the term "blue wall" in 2009. After the 2012 presidential election, Paul Steinhauser called "blue wall ... the cluster of eastern, Midwest and western states that have traditionally gone Democratic." The earliest description of the forces creating the blue wall comes from a Houston Chronicle blogger, Chris Ladd. A Republican, Ladd wrote in November 2014 that the seemingly impressive Republican win in the 2014 midterm elections had overshadowed another trend apparent in the results – a demographic and geographic collapse.

For Republicans looking for ways that the party can once again take the lead in building a nationally relevant governing agenda, the 2014 election is a prelude to a disaster. Understanding this trend begins with a stark graphic. Behold the Blue Wall.

The blue wall referred to a perceived Democratic demographic lock on the Electoral College resulting from the Republican Party's narrowing focus on the interests of white, rural, and Southern voters. According to Ladd, the presence of the blue wall means "a minimally effective Democratic candidate" is all but assured of winning either 257 electoral votes in 2016/2020, (Note: Ladd included Nevada, New Hampshire and New Mexico in his analysis, which are not commonly agreed upon as part of the wall) just 13 short of the threshold needed to win the Electoral College and the presidency, or if you include Virginia, 270 electoral votes, exactly the threshold needed to win. Ladd's analysis became popular when MSNBC commentator Lawrence O'Donnell featured it on a post-election episode of his show The Last Word with Lawrence O'Donnell. Republican nominee George W. Bush narrowly defeated Al Gore in 2000 and John Kerry in 2004 to win the electoral college because they could only pick up Iowa and New Mexico (12 votes) in 2000 and New Hampshire (4 votes) in 2004 in addition to the 1992–2012 "blue wall" states. A similar "red fortress", within which lie states solidly Republican, has also been posited to exist. But, having fewer electoral college votes, it would be theoretically easier for a Democratic presidential candidate to win without breaching it, as had been done in 2012.

== States behind the blue wall ==
Behind this "blue wall" lay states, many carrying a double-digit number of electoral votes, which appeared to be solidly behind the Democratic Party, at least on the national level. Republican presidential candidates could only contest a small selection of these states, as only a few swing states would have sufficient votes to make up the 270 threshold. States behind this wall lay generally in the Northeastern United States, the West Coast of the United States, and some of the Great Lakes states. In each of the six presidential election cycles prior to 2016, the Democratic Party had won 18 of these states (as well as the District of Columbia), totaling 238 of the necessary 270 votes need to win. The "big three" Democratic stronghold states include California, New York, and Illinois.

States falling behind this blue wall generally included those the Democrats had carried since the 1992 presidential election until the 2016 presidential election that included (in order of decreasing population and followed by current number of electoral votes): California (54), New York (28), Pennsylvania (19), Illinois (19), Michigan (15), New Jersey (14), Washington (12), Massachusetts (11), Maryland (10), Minnesota (10), Wisconsin (10), Oregon (8), Connecticut (7), Hawaii (4), Maine (4), Rhode Island (4), Delaware (3), and Vermont (3), as well as Washington, D.C. (3); this is a total of 238 votes. Had Al Gore won New Hampshire (4) in 2000 or if John Kerry had won New Mexico (5) or Iowa (7) in 2004, those states could also have become part of the blue wall states since 1992; New Mexico and New Hampshire would further support the Democratic nominee in 2016, 2020, and 2024, while Iowa would not in any.

More recently, the states of Virginia and Colorado are on a five-election Democratic voting streak since 2008, after voting for Republican nominee George W. Bush in 2000 and 2004. Virginia had been consistently Republican since 1968, while Colorado had only voted Democratic during 1992 in the same period, demonstrating the opposing trend to the blue wall. This suggests a new blue wall composed of the 19 states Kamala Harris won in 2024, which voted Democratic from 2008 to 2024.

Ronald Reagan's landslide re-election in 1984 carried all states except for Minnesota, which last voted Republican with Richard Nixon's landslide re-election in 1972; and the District of Columbia, which has voted for the Democratic candidate in every election since it was admitted to the electoral college for the 1964 election. As such, the blue wall began to materialize with the 1988 United States presidential election; states that voted solely for Democratic Presidents since 1988 are New York, Washington, Massachusetts, Oregon, Hawaii, and Rhode Island. The remainder of the blue wall was built in the 1992 United States presidential election: California, Illinois, New Jersey, Maryland, Connecticut, Maine, Delaware, and Vermont.

Three other states — the Rust Belt states of Wisconsin (1988–2012), Pennsylvania (1992–2012) and Michigan (1992–2012) — were also considered part of the wall, but the advent of Republican nominee Donald Trump showed a weakening of the Democratic hold on these states.

== 2016: First breach ==
States that traditionally voted blue (Democratic), but voted Republican in 2016 and 2024 are marked in red. Minnesota (a historic blue wall state), was won by Democrats by only 1.5% and Maine by 3% in 2016. Additionally, a congressional district in northern Maine gave the GOP one electoral vote.

The Democrats' "lock" on these states had been called into question between 2012 and 2016, as several had been competitive in recent elections, and many had Republicans currently holding elected statewide office, generally either senator or governor. Blue wall states with a Republican senator included Pennsylvania, Wisconsin, and Maine. Those with a Republican governor included Massachusetts, Maryland, and Michigan. In addition to these 18 states, three others, Iowa, New Hampshire, and New Mexico, had only voted for the Republican once in the same six election cycles, giving their votes to Republican nominee George W. Bush in either 2000 or 2004 by a margin of no more than 10,059 votes. If included in the total, the votes behind the blue wall numbered 257, just 13 short of what is needed to win. Some in the mainstream media did, however, suspect the Democrats might lose Pennsylvania.

Nate Silver had criticized the idea of the blue wall, pointing to a similar "red wall/red sea" of states that voted Republican from 1968 to 1988. He argued that the blue wall simply represented a "pretty good run" in elections, and that relatively minor gains in the popular vote could flip some of its states to Republican. This was seen in the 2016 election, where voters from manufacturing states traditionally behind the blue wall voted for Donald Trump, providing him the victory in Michigan, Pennsylvania, Wisconsin, and Maine's 2nd congressional district. Others have also posited that the states of Michigan, Pennsylvania, and Wisconsin had never definitively been "safe" for the Democratic Party, citing the close margins in those states in the 2000 and 2004 presidential elections and opining that the outsized margins of victory secured by Barack Obama in the elections of 2008 and 2012 may have created a false impression of their safety for Democratic candidates.

== 2020: Resurgence ==
During the 2020 United States presidential election, Democratic former vice president Joe Biden narrowly won the states of Wisconsin, Michigan, and Pennsylvania. However, Biden carried these states only by 0.5–3 point margins, a considerable underperformance compared to Obama's margins in these states in 2008 and 2012. Long-term trends seem less favorable to Democrats in these states as they all voted to the right of the national average and many working-class white voters there have been moving towards the Republicans.

Biden also broke into the red wall/sea by winning Arizona, Georgia, and the congressional district in Nebraska. However, Maine's 2nd congressional district voted for Donald Trump. Pundits saw former battleground states such as Colorado and Virginia becoming solidly Democratic-leaning after the 2020 election, partially as a result of demographic patterns. Biden won both of these states by more than 10% in 2020.

== 2024: Second breach ==
During the 2024 United States presidential election, Republican former president Donald Trump was able to regain the White House, largely due to the reclaiming of the battleground states in the Rust Belt: Wisconsin, Pennsylvania, and Michigan. He would also win the popular vote for the first time due to a significant collapse of Democratic turnout. The attempted assassination of Donald Trump in Pennsylvania invigorated turnout upwards of 150 thousand votes in that state, and as such Wisconsin was hence the most Democratic of the trio, where both candidates made gains. Trump's margin of victory in those states was less than two percent, very close to the national margin, but the victories added 44 electoral votes to his total. Trump's performance in the Blue Wall was more profound, as he won Pennsylvania with an outright majority, was 0.41% away from a majority in Wisconsin, and 0.28% away in Michigan. Moreover, his performance helped flip 3 House seats in the Rust Belt, as well as flip a Senate seat in Pennsylvania.

In general, the improved Republican turnout coinciding with a severe drop in Democratic turnout presented a nationally weak performance for the Democratic ticket, where over 90% of counties nationwide swung towards the Republican party. Most of the turnout drop was in Democratic stronghold states, partially due to the perception of those states being "safely Democratic", resulting in performances such as New Jersey being in striking range of 5%, and San Francisco, California voting more than 15% for Trump in the 2024 election, the highest share for a Republican presidential candidate in San Francisco in 20 years.

In 2025, Obama campaign strategist David Schale noted that the lost election was a precursor to two larger problems for Democratic presidential campaigns: population growth and demographic shifts are eroding the efficacy of the wall, and a complacency in campaigning have left Democrats unable to expand beyond the blue wall. The blue wall's "big three" of Illinois, California and New York lost Congressional seats in 2020 and are likely to lose more in 2030, transferring their electoral votes to places like Texas and Florida, both of which had a pronounced red shift in the most recent election. Moreover, New York and New Jersey saw the largest rightward shifts in the nation, with Illinois and California shifting somewhat significantly as well. This means that, even if the Rust Belt states return to Democratic hands, the addition of Virginia, New Hampshire and Colorado may not be sufficient to win the presidency. While the swing state targets of Ohio and Florida have been replaced with North Carolina, Georgia and Arizona in a roughly even electoral count, a failure to make permanent inroads over the last few decades has been considered a weakness of the Democratic Party, while the Republican Party has appeared to have made stronger continual gains.

== Red sea ==
Red wall/sea states, along with the year they have been red since

Much like Reagan's landslide defining the start of the blue wall, the red sea was defined by Lyndon B. Johnson's 1964 landslide victory. The five Solid South states Johnson lost would be won by Jimmy Carter in 1976, and hence the Democrats had won every state except Arizona at least once between these two elections.

The states which Republican candidates have won in the twelve federal elections from 1980 to 2024 are: Texas (40), Alabama (9), South Carolina (9), Oklahoma (7), Mississippi (6), Utah (6), Kansas (6), Nebraska (4) (excluding Nebraska's 2nd congressional district), Idaho (4), South Dakota (3), North Dakota (3), Alaska (3), and Wyoming (3), giving a total of 103 votes. Some of these states have streaks going back to 1968. Additionally, Tennessee (11), Missouri (10), Kentucky (8), Louisiana (8), Arkansas (6), West Virginia (4), and Montana (4) have been won by Republicans in the last seven elections (from 2000 to 2024), making more recent additions to the red wall/sea, bringing the total electoral votes up to 154. Other states with an 11-out-of-12 (from 1980 to 2024) Republican record include North Carolina (16) and Indiana (11), whose 27 electoral votes added to the 154 of the preceding twenty red sea states make for a total of 181 electoral votes. Both were won narrowly by Obama in 2008 and North Carolina remains a battleground state with decisive margins under five percent in the following four elections. Recently, Florida (30), Ohio (17), Iowa (6), and Maine's 2nd congressional district (1) have been won by Republicans in the last three elections (from 2016 to 2024), expanding more recent additions to the red wall/sea, bringing the total electoral votes up to 235 (or 208 if not including North Carolina and Indiana). Former red wall/sea states include Georgia (16) (Note: Bill Clinton and Joe Biden won the state in 1992 and 2020, respectively.) and Arizona (11), (Note: Bill Clinton and Joe Biden won the state in 1996 and 2020, respectively.) which had been won by the Republicans in nine of the eleven elections from 1984 to 2024, but are now considered swing states.

== In presidential elections ==
Presidential votes in blue wall states since 1876:

Year	California	Connecticut	Delaware	District of Columbia	Hawaii	Illinois	Maine	Maryland	Massachusetts	Michigan	Minnesota	New Jersey	New York	Oregon	Pennsylvania	Rhode Island	Vermont	Washington	Wisconsin
1876	**Hayes**	Tilden	Tilden	No election (Note: The District of Columbia did not vote in presidential elections until 1964, after ratification of the Twenty-third Amendment to the United States Constitution.)	No election (Note: Hawaii was not a state until 1959 and did not vote in presidential elections until 1960.)	**Hayes**	**Hayes**	Tilden	**Hayes**	**Hayes**	**Hayes**	Tilden	Tilden	**Hayes**	**Hayes**	**Hayes**	**Hayes**	No election (Note: Washington was not a state until 1889 and did not vote in presidential elections until 1892.)	**Hayes**
1880	Hancock	**Garfield**	Hancock	No election	No election	**Garfield**	**Garfield**	Hancock	**Garfield**	**Garfield**	**Garfield**	Hancock	**Garfield**	**Garfield**	**Garfield**	**Garfield**	**Garfield**	No election	**Garfield**
1884	Blaine	**Cleveland**	**Cleveland**	No election	No election	Blaine	Blaine	**Cleveland**	Blaine	Blaine	Blaine	**Cleveland**	**Cleveland**	Blaine	Blaine	Blaine	Blaine	No election	Blaine
1888	**Harrison**	Cleveland	Cleveland	No election	No election	**Harrison**	**Harrison**	Cleveland	**Harrison**	**Harrison**	**Harrison**	Cleveland	**Harrison**	**Harrison**	**Harrison**	**Harrison**	**Harrison**	No election	**Harrison**
1892	**Cleveland**	**Cleveland**	**Cleveland**	No election	No election	**Cleveland**	Harrison	**Cleveland**	Harrison	Harrison	Harrison	**Cleveland**	**Cleveland**	Harrison	Harrison	Harrison	Harrison	Harrison	**Cleveland**
1896	**McKinley**	**McKinley**	**McKinley**	No election	No election	**McKinley**	**McKinley**	**McKinley**	**McKinley**	**McKinley**	**McKinley**	**McKinley**	**McKinley**	**McKinley**	**McKinley**	**McKinley**	**McKinley**	Bryan	**McKinley**
1900	**McKinley**	**McKinley**	**McKinley**	No election	No election	**McKinley**	**McKinley**	**McKinley**	**McKinley**	**McKinley**	**McKinley**	**McKinley**	**McKinley**	**McKinley**	**McKinley**	**McKinley**	**McKinley**	**McKinley**	**McKinley**
1904	**Roosevelt**	**Roosevelt**	**Roosevelt**	No election	No election	**Roosevelt**	**Roosevelt**	Parker (Note: Parker won seven of Maryland’s eight electoral votes, with the other going to Roosevelt, whose highest elector actually received 51 more votes than Parker’s)	**Roosevelt**	**Roosevelt**	**Roosevelt**	**Roosevelt**	**Roosevelt**	**Roosevelt**	**Roosevelt**	**Roosevelt**	**Roosevelt**	**Roosevelt**	**Roosevelt**
1908	**Taft**	**Taft**	**Taft**	No election	No election	**Taft**	**Taft**	Bryan (Note: Taft’s highest elector actually received 605 more votes than Bryan’s, but of the top eight electors six were pledged to Bryan.)	**Taft**	**Taft**	**Taft**	**Taft**	**Taft**	**Taft**	**Taft**	**Taft**	**Taft**	**Taft**	**Taft**
1912	Roosevelt	**Wilson**	**Wilson**	No election	No election	**Wilson**	**Wilson**	**Wilson**	**Wilson**	Roosevelt	Roosevelt	**Wilson**	**Wilson**	**Wilson**	Roosevelt	**Wilson**	Taft	Roosevelt	**Wilson**
1916	**Wilson**	Hughes	Hughes	No election	No election	Hughes	Hughes	**Wilson**	Hughes	Hughes	Hughes	Hughes	Hughes	Hughes	Hughes	Hughes	Hughes	**Wilson**	Hughes
1920	**Harding**	**Harding**	**Harding**	No election	No election	**Harding**	**Harding**	**Harding**	**Harding**	**Harding**	**Harding**	**Harding**	**Harding**	**Harding**	**Harding**	**Harding**	**Harding**	**Harding**	**Harding**
1924	**Coolidge**	**Coolidge**	**Coolidge**	No election	No election	**Coolidge**	**Coolidge**	**Coolidge**	**Coolidge**	**Coolidge**	**Coolidge**	**Coolidge**	**Coolidge**	**Coolidge**	**Coolidge**	**Coolidge**	**Coolidge**	**Coolidge**	La Follette
1928	**Hoover**	**Hoover**	**Hoover**	No election	No election	**Hoover**	**Hoover**	**Hoover**	Smith	**Hoover**	**Hoover**	**Hoover**	**Hoover**	**Hoover**	**Hoover**	Smith	**Hoover**	**Hoover**	**Hoover**
1932	**Roosevelt**	Hoover	Hoover	No election	No election	**Roosevelt**	Hoover	**Roosevelt**	**Roosevelt**	**Roosevelt**	**Roosevelt**	**Roosevelt**	**Roosevelt**	**Roosevelt**	Hoover	**Roosevelt**	Hoover	**Roosevelt**	**Roosevelt**
1936	**Roosevelt**	**Roosevelt**	**Roosevelt**	No election	No election	**Roosevelt**	Landon	**Roosevelt**	**Roosevelt**	**Roosevelt**	**Roosevelt**	**Roosevelt**	**Roosevelt**	**Roosevelt**	**Roosevelt**	**Roosevelt**	Landon	**Roosevelt**	**Roosevelt**
1940	**Roosevelt**	**Roosevelt**	**Roosevelt**	No election	No election	**Roosevelt**	Willkie	**Roosevelt**	**Roosevelt**	Willkie	**Roosevelt**	**Roosevelt**	**Roosevelt**	**Roosevelt**	**Roosevelt**	**Roosevelt**	Willkie	**Roosevelt**	**Roosevelt**
1944	**Roosevelt**	**Roosevelt**	**Roosevelt**	No election	No election	**Roosevelt**	Dewey	**Roosevelt**	**Roosevelt**	**Roosevelt**	**Roosevelt**	**Roosevelt**	**Roosevelt**	**Roosevelt**	**Roosevelt**	**Roosevelt**	Dewey	**Roosevelt**	Dewey
1948	**Truman**	Dewey	Dewey	No election	No election	**Truman**	Dewey	Dewey	**Truman**	Dewey	**Truman**	Dewey	Dewey	Dewey	Dewey	**Truman**	Dewey	**Truman**	**Truman**
1952	**Eisenhower**	**Eisenhower**	**Eisenhower**	No election	No election	**Eisenhower**	**Eisenhower**	**Eisenhower**	**Eisenhower**	**Eisenhower**	**Eisenhower**	**Eisenhower**	**Eisenhower**	**Eisenhower**	**Eisenhower**	**Eisenhower**	**Eisenhower**	**Eisenhower**	**Eisenhower**
1956	**Eisenhower**	**Eisenhower**	**Eisenhower**	No election	No election	**Eisenhower**	**Eisenhower**	**Eisenhower**	**Eisenhower**	**Eisenhower**	**Eisenhower**	**Eisenhower**	**Eisenhower**	**Eisenhower**	**Eisenhower**	**Eisenhower**	**Eisenhower**	**Eisenhower**	**Eisenhower**
1960	Nixon	**Kennedy**	**Kennedy**	No election	**Kennedy**	**Kennedy**	Nixon	**Kennedy**	**Kennedy**	**Kennedy**	**Kennedy**	**Kennedy**	**Kennedy**	Nixon	**Kennedy**	**Kennedy**	Nixon	Nixon	Nixon
1964	**Johnson**	**Johnson**	**Johnson**	**Johnson**	**Johnson**	**Johnson**	**Johnson**	**Johnson**	**Johnson**	**Johnson**	**Johnson**	**Johnson**	**Johnson**	**Johnson**	**Johnson**	**Johnson**	**Johnson**	**Johnson**	**Johnson**
1968	**Nixon**	Humphrey	**Nixon**	Humphrey	Humphrey	**Nixon**	Humphrey	Humphrey	Humphrey	Humphrey	Humphrey	**Nixon**	Humphrey	**Nixon**	Humphrey	Humphrey	**Nixon**	Humphrey	**Nixon**
1972	**Nixon**	**Nixon**	**Nixon**	McGovern	**Nixon**	**Nixon**	**Nixon**	**Nixon**	McGovern	**Nixon**	**Nixon**	**Nixon**	**Nixon**	**Nixon**	**Nixon**	**Nixon**	**Nixon**	**Nixon**	**Nixon**
1976	Ford	Ford	**Carter**	**Carter**	**Carter**	Ford	Ford	**Carter**	**Carter**	Ford	**Carter**	Ford	**Carter**	Ford	**Carter**	**Carter**	Ford	Ford	**Carter**
1980	**Reagan**	**Reagan**	**Reagan**	Carter	Carter	**Reagan**	**Reagan**	Carter	**Reagan**	**Reagan**	Carter	**Reagan**	**Reagan**	**Reagan**	**Reagan**	Carter	**Reagan**	**Reagan**	**Reagan**
1984	**Reagan**	**Reagan**	**Reagan**	Mondale	**Reagan**	**Reagan**	**Reagan**	**Reagan**	**Reagan**	**Reagan**	Mondale	**Reagan**	**Reagan**	**Reagan**	**Reagan**	**Reagan**	**Reagan**	**Reagan**	**Reagan**
1988	**Bush**	**Bush**	**Bush**	Dukakis	Dukakis	**Bush**	**Bush**	**Bush**	Dukakis	**Bush**	Dukakis	**Bush**	Dukakis	Dukakis	**Bush**	Dukakis	**Bush**	Dukakis	Dukakis
1992	**Clinton**	**Clinton**	**Clinton**	**Clinton**	**Clinton**	**Clinton**	**Clinton**	**Clinton**	**Clinton**	**Clinton**	**Clinton**	**Clinton**	**Clinton**	**Clinton**	**Clinton**	**Clinton**	**Clinton**	**Clinton**	**Clinton**
1996	**Clinton**	**Clinton**	**Clinton**	**Clinton**	**Clinton**	**Clinton**	**Clinton**	**Clinton**	**Clinton**	**Clinton**	**Clinton**	**Clinton**	**Clinton**	**Clinton**	**Clinton**	**Clinton**	**Clinton**	**Clinton**	**Clinton**
2000	Gore	Gore	Gore	Gore	Gore	Gore	Gore	Gore	Gore	Gore	Gore	Gore	Gore	Gore	Gore	Gore	Gore	Gore	Gore
2004	Kerry	Kerry	Kerry	Kerry	Kerry	Kerry	Kerry	Kerry	Kerry	Kerry	Kerry	Kerry	Kerry	Kerry	Kerry	Kerry	Kerry	Kerry	Kerry
2008	**Obama**	**Obama**	**Obama**	**Obama**	**Obama**	**Obama**	**Obama**	**Obama**	**Obama**	**Obama**	**Obama**	**Obama**	**Obama**	**Obama**	**Obama**	**Obama**	**Obama**	**Obama**	**Obama**
2012	**Obama**	**Obama**	**Obama**	**Obama**	**Obama**	**Obama**	**Obama**	**Obama**	**Obama**	**Obama**	**Obama**	**Obama**	**Obama**	**Obama**	**Obama**	**Obama**	**Obama**	**Obama**	**Obama**
2016	Clinton	Clinton	Clinton	Clinton	Clinton	Clinton	Clinton (Note: Clinton won Maine's statewide vote, but Trump won one of the state's four electoral votes. Since the 1972 election, Maine has awarded two electoral votes to the winner of the statewide popular vote, with one vote going to the winner in each congressional district.)	Clinton	Clinton	**Trump**	Clinton	Clinton	Clinton	Clinton	**Trump**	Clinton	Clinton	Clinton	**Trump**
2020	**Biden**	**Biden**	**Biden**	**Biden**	**Biden**	**Biden**	**Biden** (Note: Biden won Maine's statewide vote, but Trump won one of the state's four electoral votes. Since the 1972 election, Maine has awarded two electoral votes to the winner of the statewide popular vote, with one vote going to the winner in each congressional district.)	**Biden**	**Biden**	**Biden**	**Biden**	**Biden**	**Biden**	**Biden**	**Biden**	**Biden**	**Biden**	**Biden**	**Biden**
2024	Harris	Harris	Harris	Harris	Harris	Harris	Harris (Note: Harris won Maine's statewide vote, but Trump won one of the state's four electoral votes. Since the 1972 election, Maine has awarded two electoral votes to the winner of the statewide popular vote, with one vote going to the winner in each congressional district.)	Harris	Harris	**Trump**	Harris	Harris	Harris	Harris	**Trump**	Harris	Harris	Harris	**Trump**
Year	California	Connecticut	Delaware	District of Columbia	Hawaii	Illinois	Maine	Maryland	Massachusetts	Michigan	Minnesota	New Jersey	New York	Oregon	Pennsylvania	Rhode Island	Vermont	Washington	Wisconsin

Key

Democratic Party nominee
Republican Party nominee
Third-party nominee (Note: These were all named nationally as the "Progressive Party", though the 1924 version was not a continuation of the 1912 one.)

Bold denotes candidates elected as president.

== See also ==
- Bible Belt
- Blue wall (British politics)
- Jesusland map
- Left Coast
- Political culture of the United States
- Red states and blue states
- Red wall (UK), the equivalent of the blue wall for the Labour Party
- Rust Belt
- Sixth Party System
- Solid South
- Southern strategy
- Sun Belt
- Swing state
