= Maes–Garreau law =

Rule of thumb about prediction dates

The Maes–Garreau law is the statement that "most favorable predictions about future technology will fall within the Maes–Garreau point", defined as "the latest possible date a prediction can come true and still remain in the lifetime of the person making it". Specifically, it relates to predictions of a technological singularity or other radical future technologies.

It has been referred to as a "law of human nature", although Kelly's evidence is anecdotal.

== Origin ==
Kevin Kelly, editor of Wired magazine, created the law in 2007 after being influenced by Pattie Maes at MIT and Joel Garreau (author of Radical Evolution).

In 1993, Maes listed a number of her colleagues at MIT that had publicly predicted mind uploading (the replication of a human brain on a computer), and noted that the innovations were generally slated to occur approximately 70 years after the birth of the predictor. As quoted by her colleague Rodney Brooks:

She took as many people as she could find who had publicly predicted downloading of consciousness into silicon, and plotted the dates of their predictions, along with when they themselves would turn seventy years old. Not too surprisingly, the years matched up for each of them. Three score and ten years from their individual births, technology would be ripe for them to download their consciousnesses into a computer. Just in the nick of time! They were each, in their own minds, going to be remarkably lucky, to be in just the right place at the right time.

== Failed attempts to verify Maes-Garreau ==
The Machine Intelligence Research Institute released a paper detailing a much larger set of 95 AI predictions extracted from a database of 257 AI predictions, which finds a broad array of estimates significantly before and after a predictor's estimated longevity, thus contradicting the law. MIRI states a stronger rule as being "Maes-Garreau": "the predictor expects AI to be developed at the exact end of their life."
