= The Nine Nations of North America =

1981 book by Joel Garreau

- Cover of the first edition
- Author: Joel Garreau
- Language: English
- Published: 1981
- Publisher: Houghton Mifflin
- Publication place: United States
- Media type: Print (Hardcover and Paperback)
- ISBN: 0-395-29124-0
- OCLC: 318457577
- Dewey Decimal: 970.053
- LC Class: E38 .G37

The Nine Nations of North America is a 1981 book by Joel Garreau, in which the author suggests that North America can be divided into nine nations, which have distinctive economic and cultural features. He also argues that conventional national and state borders are largely artificial and irrelevant, and that his "nations" provide a more accurate way of understanding the true nature of North American society. The work has been called "a classic text on the current regionalization of North America".

== The nine nations ==
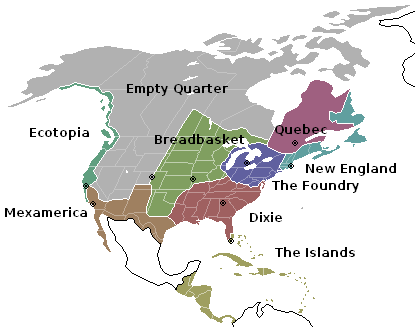
Approximate map of the Nine Nations of North America with each of their capitals

- New England – an expanded version including not only Maine, New Hampshire, Vermont, Rhode Island, Massachusetts and Connecticut (although omitting the southwestern portion of Connecticut within the New York metropolitan area), but also the Canadian Atlantic provinces of New Brunswick, Nova Scotia, Prince Edward Island, and Newfoundland and Labrador. Capital: Boston.
- The Foundry – the by-then-declining industrial areas of the northeastern United States and Great Lakes region stretching from New York City to northeast Wisconsin and down to the suburbs of Washington, D.C., in Northern Virginia, and including Chicago, Milwaukee, Indianapolis, Pittsburgh, Cleveland, Toledo, Philadelphia, and Southern Ontario. Capital: Detroit.
- Dixie – the former Confederate States of America (today the southeastern United States) centered on Atlanta, and including most of eastern Texas. While northern Virginia and most of Maryland are culturally not part of Dixie, he includes most of Virginia and West Virginia in "Dixie" as well as Kentucky; southern and southeastern portions of Missouri, southern Illinois, and southern Indiana; and the "Little Dixie" region of southeastern Oklahoma. Finally, the region also includes most of Florida, as far south as the cities of Fort Myers and Naples. Capital: Atlanta.
- The Breadbasket – most of the Great Plains states and part of the Prairie provinces: Iowa, Kansas, Minnesota, Nebraska, the Dakotas, almost all of Oklahoma, parts of Missouri, western Wisconsin, eastern Colorado, the eastern edge of New Mexico, central Illinois, a portion of Indiana, and North Texas. Also included are some of Northern Ontario and southern Saskatchewan and Manitoba. Capital: Kansas City.
- The Islands – The South Florida metropolitan area, the Everglades and Florida Keys, and the Caribbean. Capital: Miami.
- Mexamerica – the southern and Central Valley portions of California as well as southern Arizona, the portion of Texas bordering on the Rio Grande, most of New Mexico, northern Mexico, and the Baja California Peninsula. Capital: Los Angeles.
- Ecotopia – the Pacific Northwest coast west of the Cascade Range and the Coast Mountains, as well as several Alaskan Pacific Coast Ranges, stretching from Alaska down through coastal British Columbia, Washington state, Oregon, and into California just north of Santa Barbara. Capital: San Francisco.
- The Empty Quarter – most of Alaska, Nevada, Utah, Wyoming, Idaho, Montana and Colorado from Denver west, as well as the eastern portions of Oregon, California, Washington, all of Alberta and Northern Canada (including what is now Nunavut), northern Arizona, parts of New Mexico (mainly the area controlled by the Navajo Nation), and British Columbia east of the Coast Ranges. Its capital is Denver, close to the border with The Breadbasket.
- Quebec – the primarily French-speaking province of Canada, which held unsuccessful referendums on secession in 1980 and 1995. Capital: Quebec City.

Garreau also discussed several areas that he termed "aberrations":

- Washington, D.C., and its surrounding area, specifically referring to the area "inside the Beltway".
- Manhattan south of Harlem (he placed Harlem, and by extension the Manhattan neighborhoods to its north, clearly within The Foundry), along with Connecticut's Fairfield County.
- Hawaii, which the author considered an Asian aberration as much as a North American aberration.
- Northern Alaska, despite its categorization on the front cover as part of the Empty Quarter, was listed in the aberrations section of the book.

Despite their presence within North America, Garreau did not assign the central and southern regions of the country of Mexico to any of his nine nations.

== Reception ==
In The Boston Phoenix, Michael Matza wrote that "it is Garreau's affection for the easy observation -- the serviceable cliché -- that undercuts Nine Nations, a book that tells much that we already know in language that is entertaining and sometimes refreshing. It is, perhaps, more like Coca-Cola than Garreau lets on: effervescent, short of intoxicating."

== See also ==
- American exceptionalism
- American Nations, 2011 book written by Colin Woodard that focuses on nations similar to Joel Garreau's The Nine Nations of North America.
- Bible Belt
- Bioregionalism
- Cascadia (independence movement)
- Ecotopia
- Jesusland map
- Political culture of the United States
