= Northern America =

Northernmost subregion of North America

- Area: 21,780,142 km^{2} (8,409,360 sq mi)
- Population: 375,278,947 (2021 est.)
- Population density: 16.5/km^{2} (42.7/sq mi)
- GDP (nominal): $37.14 trillion (2025)
- Demonym: Northern American
- Countries: 2: Canada; United States (excl. Hawaii)
- Dependencies: 3: Bermuda (United Kingdom); Greenland (Denmark); Saint Pierre and Miquelon (France)
- Languages: English, French, Spanish, Danish, Greenlandic, and various recognized regional languages
- Time zones: UTC−10:00 (west Aleutians) to UTC+00:00 (Danmarkshavn, Greenland)
- Largest cities: 10 largest cities in Northern America: (2025): # (United States) New York City; 1. (United States) Los Angeles; 2. (Canada) Toronto; 3. (United States) Chicago; 4. (United States) Houston; 5. (Canada) Montreal; 6. (United States) Philadelphia; 7. (United States) Phoenix; 8. (Canada) Calgary; 9. (United States) San Antonio
- UN M49 codes: 021 – Northern America; 003 – North America; 019 – Americas; 001 – World

Northern America is the northernmost subregion of North America, as well as the northernmost region in the Americas. The boundaries may be drawn significantly differently depending on the source of the definition. In one definition, it lies directly north of Middle America. Northern America's land frontier with the rest of North America then coincides with the Mexico–United States border. Geopolitically, according to the United Nations' scheme of geographical regions and subregions, Northern America consists of Bermuda, Canada, Greenland, Saint Pierre and Miquelon and the United States (the contiguous United States and Alaska only, excluding Hawaii, Navassa Island, Puerto Rico, the United States Virgin Islands, and other minor U.S. Pacific territories).

== Definitions ==
The Solemn Act of the Declaration of Independence of Northern America in 1813 applied to Mexico. Today, Northern America includes the Canada–US dyad, developed countries that exhibit very high Human Development Indexes and intense economic integration while sharing many socioeconomic characteristics.

The World Geographical Scheme for Recording Plant Distributions has "Northern America" as the seventh of its nine "botanical continents". Its definition differs from the usual political one: Mexico is included, Bermuda is excluded (being placed in the Caribbean region), Hawaii is excluded (being placed in the Pacific botanical continent) and all of the Aleutian Islands, Russian as well as American, are included.

== Countries and territories ==
Country / Territory	Population	Area (km^{2})	Density (people per km^{2})	Capital
Bermuda	64,185	53.2	1,206.48	Hamilton
Canada	38,155,012	9,984,670	3.82	Ottawa
Greenland	56,243	2,166,086	0.03	Nuuk
Saint Pierre and Miquelon	5,883	242	24.31	Saint-Pierre
United States	336,997,624	9,826,675	34.29	Washington, D.C.

* indicates "Demographics of country or territory" links.

== Demographics ==
Year	Population	% change	Canada	%	United States	%
1950	172,603,000	—	13,733,000	8.0%	158,804,000	92.0%
1960	204,649,000	+18.6%	17,847,000	8.7%	186,721,000	91.2%
1970	230,992,000	+12.9%	21,374,000	9.3%	209,513,000	90.7%
1980	254,007,000	+10.0%	24,417,000	9.6%	229,476,000	90.3%
1990	279,785,000	+10.1%	27,541,000	9.8%	252,120,000	90.1%
2000	312,427,000	+11.7%	30,588,000	9.8%	281,711,000	90.2%
2010	343,287,000	+9.9%	34,148,000	9.9%	309,011,000	90.0%
2020	368,870,000	+7.5%	37,742,000	10.2%	331,003,000	89.7%

== See also ==
- Americas (terminology)
- Anglo-America
- Caribbean
- Central America
- Middle America
- The Nine Nations of North America
- West Indies
- Western world
