= Colin Woodard =

American journalist (born 1968)

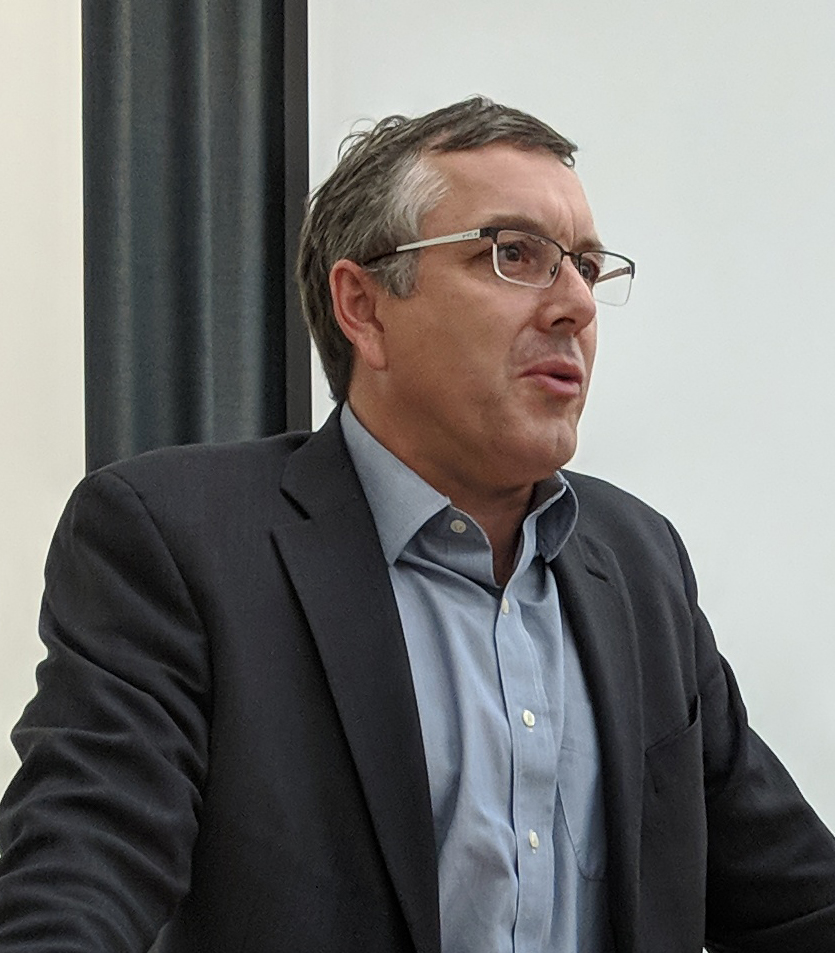
- Woodard at the 2018 conference of Maine Archives and Museums
- Born: December 3, 1968 (age 57)
- Education: Tufts University (BA); University of Chicago (MA)
- Occupations: Journalist; writer
- Writing career
- Notable work: American Nations (2011)
- Website: colinwoodard.com

Colin Strohn Woodard (born December 3, 1968) is an American journalist and writer known for his books American Nations: A History of the Eleven Rival Regional Cultures of North America (2011), The Republic of Pirates (2007), and The Lobster Coast (2004), a cultural and environmental history of coastal Maine. He is known for his writing that examines how the historically distinct regional cultures of America shape its current politics, society and health status.

== Early life and education ==
Woodard was born to James Strohn Woodard and Karen Andersen in 1968.

Woodard graduated from Tufts University with a B.A. and completed his M.A. in international relations at the University of Chicago. In 1999 he was a Pew Fellow in International Journalism at the Johns Hopkins University School of Advanced International Studies. In 2021 he was named a visiting senior fellow at the Pell Center for International Relations and Public Policy at Salve Regina University, where he is now founder and director of Nationhood Lab. He is a Fellow of the Royal Geographical Society.

== Career ==
Woodard is the author of seven works of non-fiction. His first book, Ocean's End: Travels Through Endangered Seas, appeared in 2000. His most recent, Nations Apart: How Clashing Regional Cultures Shattered America was published Nov. 4, 2025.

He is Director of Nationhood Lab at the Pell Center for International Relations and Public Policy at Salve Regina University, a project focused on counteracting the authoritarian threat to American democracy and the centrifugal forces threatening the U.S. federation's stability. Prior to that he was State & National Affairs Writer at the Portland Press Herald and Maine Sunday Telegram where he received a 2012 George Polk Award and was a finalist for the 2016 Pulitzer Prize for Explanatory Reporting for a series on climate change and the Gulf of Maine.

He received a 2004 Jane Bagley Lehman Award for Public Advocacy for his global environmental reporting, the 2012 Maine Literary Award for Non-Fiction for American Nations, the 2016 Maine Literary Award for Non-Fiction for American Character and a Pew Fellowship in International Journalism at the Johns Hopkins University School of Advanced International Studies. Woodard was a finalist for the 2016 Chautauqua Prize for American Character and for a Gerald Loeb Award for Distinguished Business and Financial Journalism in both 2013 and 2014. In 2014, The Washington Post named him one of the "Best State Capitol Reporters in America" and the Maine Press Association chose him as Journalist of the Year.

His third book, The New York Times bestseller The Republic of Pirates, was the basis of the 2014 NBC drama Crossbones, written by Neil Cross and starring John Malkovich. Woodard was a historical consultant for Assassin's Creed IV: Black Flag, which was set in the time period covered in Republic of Pirates.

He was a long-time foreign correspondent of The Christian Science Monitor, San Francisco Chronicle, and The Chronicle of Higher Education, and has reported from more than fifty foreign countries and seven continents, from postings in Budapest, Hungary; Zagreb, Croatia; Washington, D.C.; and the US–Mexico border. His work has appeared in dozens of publications including The Economist, The New York Times, Smithsonian, The Washington Post, Newsweek/The Daily Beast, Bloomberg View, The Guardian, Washington Monthly, and Down East, where he was a contributing editor. He was also a contributing editor at Politico.

His sixth book, Union: The Struggle to Forge the Story of United States Nationhood was published in the spring of 2020 and named a Christian Science Monitor Book of the Year. Jill Leovy, in The American Scholar, said the book "shows just how powerful a form popular nonfiction can be in the hands of a disciplined writer who won’t tolerate generality or abstraction." Thomas Koenig, writing in Loyola's Commonweal Magazine, reviewed the book and called it "a fast-paced, character-centered narrative" but questioned its lack of women's voices. In The Washington Post, David W. Blight said "Woodard succeeds in demonstrating the high stakes of master narratives, versions of the past that people choose as identities and stories in which they wish to live."

== Selected works ==
- Ocean's End: Travel through Endangered Seas, Basic Books, 2000, ISBN 978-0465015719 ; Chinese edition: Yiwen, 2002, ISBN 978-7532728022
- The Lobster Coast: Rebels, Rusticators, and the Struggle for a Forgotten Frontier, Viking, 2004, ISBN 978-0143035343
- The Republic of Pirates: Being The True and Surprising Story of the Caribbean Pirates and the Man Who Brought Them Down, Harcourt, 2007, ISBN 978-0156034623; UK edition: Pan MacMillan, 2014, ISBN 978-1447243939 ; Spanish edition: Critica, 2008, ISBN 978-8484321323 ; Danish edition: Borgens Forlag, 2008, ISBN 978-8721031985; Polish edition: SQN, 2014, ISBN 978-83-79242337; Portuguese edition: Novo Seculo, 2014, ISBN 978-8542802771; Hungarian edition: Könyvmolyképző Kiadó, 2014, ISBN 978-9633739808; Simplified Chinese edition: Social Sciences Academic Press, 2016, ISBN 978-7509794227; Complex Chinese edition: Cite/Business Weekly, 2015, ISBN 978-9866032769; Lithuanian edition: Leidykla Briedis, 2021, ISBN 978-9955268345; Japanese edition: Panorolling, 2021, ISBN 978-4775942512; Romanian edition, Editura Art, 2023, ISBN 978-6067106589
- American Nations: A History of the Eleven Rival Regional Cultures of North America, Viking, 2011, ISBN 978-0143122029 ; Korean edition, Geulhangari Publishers, 2017, ISBN 978-8967354329; Japanese edition, Iwanami Shoten, 2017, ISBN 978-4000220972 ; Simplified Chinese edition, Social Sciences Academic Press, 2021,ISBN 978-7520178853 ; Complex Chinese edition, Gusa Publishers, 2024, ISBN 978-6267234860
- American Character: A History of the Epic Struggle Between Individual Liberty and the Common Good, Viking, 2016, ISBN 978-0525427896; Complex Chinese edition, Gusa Publishers, 2023, ISBN 978-6267234662.
- Union: The Struggle to Forge the Story of United States Nationhood, Viking, 2020, ISBN 978-0525560159
- Nations Apart: How Clashing Regional Cultures Shattered America, Viking, 2025, ISBN 978-0593833407

== See also ==
- Bible Belt
- Bioregionalism
- Cascadia (independence movement)
- Ecotopia
- Jesusland map
- Political culture of the United States
