= Daniel J. Elazar =

American political scientist (1934–1999)

- Born: August 25, 1934; Minneapolis, Minnesota, U.S.
- Died: December 2, 1999 (aged 65); Jerusalem
- Education: University of Chicago
- Occupation: Political scientist
- Known for: Founder of Center for the Study of Federalism and founder and president of Jerusalem Center for Public Affairs

Daniel Judah Elazar (August 25, 1934 – December 2, 1999) was a political scientist known for his seminal studies of political culture of the US states. He was professor of political science at Bar-Ilan University in Israel and Temple University in Pennsylvania, and director of the Center for the Study of Federalism at Temple University and the founder and president of the Jerusalem Center for Public Affairs.

== Biography ==
Elazar was born in Minneapolis in 1934. He received his M.A. and Ph.D. from the University of Chicago where he studied under renowned federalism scholar Morton Grodzins. He maintained residences in Philadelphia and Jerusalem. He was married to Harriet, with whom he had three children.

== Academic career ==
Elazar was a political scientist and specialist in the study of federalism, political culture, the Jewish political tradition, and founder and president of the Jerusalem Center for Public Affairs think tank. He was Professor of Political Science at Temple University in Philadelphia, where he founded and directed the Center for the Study of Federalism. He held the Senator N.M. Paterson Professorship in Intergovernmental Relations at Bar-Ilan University in Israel, heading its Institute for Local Government. In 1986, President Reagan appointed him a citizen member of the U.S. Advisory Commission on Intergovernmental Relations, the major intergovernmental agency dealing with federalism issues. He was appointed for a second term in 1988 and a third in 1991.

Elazar was the author or editor of more than 60 books and many other publications including a 4-volume study of the Covenant Tradition in Politics, as well as Community and Polity, The Jewish Polity, and People and Polity, a trilogy on Jewish political and community organization from earliest times to the present. He also founded and edited the scholarly journal Jewish Political Studies Review. His books in the area of federalism include The American Partnership (1962); American Federalism: A View from the States (1966); The American Mosaic (1994); and Exploring Federalism (1987). He was also the author of a multi-generational study of the development of civil community in midwestern cities. The research produced Cities of the Prairie (1970), Cities of the Prairie Revisited (1986) and Cities of the Prairie: Opening Cybernetic Frontiers (2004). He was also the founder and editor of Publius, the Journal of Federalism.

Elazar was recognized as an expert on Jewish community organization worldwide, on the Jewish political tradition, and on Israel's government and politics. He was a consultant to the Israeli government, the Jewish Agency, the World Zionist Organization, the city of Jerusalem, and to most major Jewish organizations in the United States and in Canada, Europe, South Africa and Australia. He took a leadership role in numerous local and national Jewish organizations. He was President of the American Sephardi Federation, and served on the International Council of Yad Vashem.

Elazar was twice a John Simon Guggenheim Fellow, a fellow at the Katz Center for Advanced Judaic Studies, a Fulbright Senior Lecturer, and received grants from the American Council of Learned Societies, the Earhart and Ford Foundations, the Huntington Library, the National Endowment for the Humanities, and the National Science Foundation. He served as consultant to many federal, state and local agencies, including the U.S. Departments of Education, Health and Human Services, and Housing and Urban Development, the National Governors' Association, the Education Commission of the States, and the Pennsylvania Science and Technology Commission, as well as to the governments of Israel, Canada, Cyprus, Italy, South Africa, and Spain.

== Political theories ==
Elazar authored a four-volume comprehensive work on the idea of covenant called The Covenant Tradition in Politics and wrote extensively about the tradition of politics in Jewish scripture and thinking. His works on the subject include: Kinship and Consent: The Jewish Political Tradition and Its Contemporary Uses, Authority, Power and Leadership in the Jewish Polity: Cases and Issues, and Morality and Power: Contemporary Jewish Views.

The Elazar typology of Jewish communal involvement is a typology laid out in Community and Polity: The Organizational Dynamics of American Jewry. It categorizes the degree of involvement American Jews have in the Jewish community. His theories on the political subcultures in the American states, articulated in American Federalism, A View From the States have been influential and remains relevant among scholars of American politics. Elazar argues that there are three dominant political subcultures in the American states: moralistic (government viewed as egalitarian institution charged with pursuing the common good), traditionalistic (government viewed a hierarchical institution charged with protecting an elite-centered status quo), and individualistic (government viewed as minimalist institution charged with protecting the functionality of the marketplace but is otherwise not active). Elazar's theory is still routinely used as variable in academic research and is discussed in most textbooks on American state and local government.

== Published works ==
- The American Partnership: Intergovernmental Cooperation in the United States, 1962
- American Federalism: A View from the States. 1966
- The American System: A New View of Government in the United States, edited for Morton Grodzins, 1966
- Cooperation and Conflict, Readings in American Federalism, Elazar as editor, 1969
- The Politics of American Federalism, editor, 1969
- Cities of the Prairie: The Metropolitan Frontier and American Politics, 1970
- The Politics of Belleville, 1971
- The Ecology of American Political Culture, editor with Joseph Zikmund II, 1975
- Community and Polity: The Organizational Dynamics of American Jewry, 1976
- A Classification System for Libraries of Judaica, with David H. Elazar, 1979
- Self Rule/Shared Rule: Federal Solutions to the Middle East Conflict, editor, 1979
- Federalism and Political Integration, editor, 1979
- Republicanism, Representation and Consent: Views of the Founding Era, editor, 1979
- Kinship and Consent: The Jewish Political Tradition and Its Contemporary Uses, editor, 1981
- Governing Peoples and Territories, editor, 1982
- Judea, Samaria, and Gaza: Views on the Present and Future, editor, 1982
- State Constitutional Design in Federal Systems, editor with Stephen L. Schechter, 1982
- Covenant, Polity and Constitutionalism, editor with John Kincaid, 1983
- Jewish Communities in Frontier Societies, with Peter Medding, 1983
- Kinship and Consent: The Jewish Political Tradition and Its Contemporary Uses, editor, 1983
- From Autonomy to Shared Rule: Options for Judea, Samaria, and Gaza, editor, 1983
- The Balkan Jewish Communities: Yugoslavia, Bulgaria, Greece, and Turkey, with Harriet Pass Friedenrich, Baruch Hazzan, and Adina Weiss Liberies, 1984
- The Jewish Communities of Scandinavia: Sweden, Denmark, Norway and Finland, with Adina Weiss Liberies and Simcha Werner, 1984
- Understanding the Jewish Agency: A Handbook, editor with Alysa M. Dortort, 1984
- The Jewish Polity: Jewish Political Organization From Biblical Times to the Present, with Stuart A. Cohen, 1985
- The Covenant Connection: From Federal Theology to Modern Federalism, editor with John Kincaid, 2000

== See also ==
- Political culture of the United States
