= Ecotopia Emerging =

1981 novel by Ernest Callenbach

- Paperback cover
- Author: Ernest Callenbach
- Language: English
- Genre: Novel
- Published: 1981 (Banyan Tree Books)
- Publication place: United States
- Media type: Print (hardback & paperback)
- Pages: 326
- ISBN: 0-9604320-4-3 (hardback); 0-9604320-3-5 (paperback)
- OCLC: 7596835
- Dewey Decimal: 813/.54 19
- LC Class: PS3553.A424 E3
- Preceded by: Ecotopia

Ecotopia Emerging (EE) by Ernest Callenbach is a fictionalized history of events leading up to the secession of regions of the Pacific Coast of the United States: Northern California, Oregon, and Washington join to form the environmentalist nation of Ecotopia which is said to have steady-state economy. In 1975, Callenbach had published a utopian novel titled Ecotopia about the events; EE is the prequel, published in 1981. The EE story seems to take place in the 1990s; Callenbach assumes that the pro-business, anti-environmental Reagan-era policies—already evident at the time of publication—will have persisted in the United States after Reagan's presidency.

Ecotopia has been extremely popular and influential. Although EE addresses the question of 'how to get there from here,' it has received much less attention. On its release, Publishers Weekly reviewed it as a “young adult” book.

== Plot summary ==
EE is mainly a history of the Ecotopian independence movement. The main characters are Vera Allwen, the leader of the Survivalist Party, and Lou Swift, a teenage physicist, along with their families and friends. Other characters are shown briefly as each one decides independently to break with the American status quo and begin living in an Ecotopian (low-tech, sustainable) fashion.

Bolinas, California, high school student Lou Swift finds a way to generate electricity cheaply from seawater in a solar cell. However, she does not understand how the cell works. She refuses to publish her results until she understands the science. Because she is determined to make the cell design freely available, she spurns corporate and academic offers to buy the cell design. Meanwhile, spies and burglars try to obtain her notes.

Vera Allwen is a California state senator. Angered by an Eastern food corporation's announcement it would stop selling fresh produce, she and other politicians, artists, and professionals form a new political party. It is decentralized, environmentalist, and populist. They create a platform and name it the Survivalist Party. As the book proceeds, they spread their ideas, coalition with like-minded people, and become a regional political force. Vera's speeches are reprinted within the text. Some of their ideas come from a short novel called Ecotopia, and the Party publishes a paper called "The Survivalist Way to Ecotopia." The Party creates a think tank for environmentalist policies. When the Pacific Northwest states pass a special tax on cars to reduce car use, the U.S. Supreme Court overturns it; public outrage along the Pacific coast helps tip the people of the region toward supporting the Survivalist Party.

When the Quebec government offers to establish diplomatic relations, the Party starts thinking about independence. A nuclear accident gives them the governorship of Washington State, and Northern California's refusal to keep supplying Southern California with water leads to the state splitting into two. An ardent secessionist claims to have planted dirty bombs in New York City and Washington, DC, and threatens they will explode if the U.S. attacks the region. Bolinas declares itself independent of other governments. The Survivalist Party has infiltrated local units of the National Guard, which are now sympathetic to the secessionists. The U.S. is too busy with a war in Brazil to send troops to pacify Bolinas and its supporters. In a lucky coincidence, the U.S. helicopters massing on the Nevada border and preparing to attack the region are suddenly recalled to deal with a crisis in Saudi Arabia, and secession seems likely to proceed.

Meanwhile, in the future Ecotopia, individuals move the local economy toward a more sustainable model. A collective sets up a solar remodeling business; a young man uses goats to mow lawns. Berkeley creates car-free zones; other cities adopt them. A suburban tract is replanted as an orchard. Rural residents build a lightweight, cheap horse-drawn buggy, and stills to distill alcohol from farm waste. Eventually, a large part of the public is car-free and ready to take the final steps to a sustainable economy.

Lou discovers the key chemical that makes her solar cell work. She publishes her paper and people start building their own cells. With this breakthrough, the region is no longer dependent for energy on the rest of the U.S. for imported fossil fuels or nuclear power. With this energy independence, the future nation of Ecotopia becomes a practical possibility.

These events occur against economic and political breakdown in the U.S.: corporate concentration, slashed government budgets, and military adventurism abroad, aided by a compliant corporate media. The automobile habit has essentially bankrupted the U.S. Refusing to develop alternative energy sources, “oil-hungry America lurched toward some unseen economic catastrophe.” At the end, the Saudi oil refineries have been bombed, and the U.S. military is caught up in a war in the Middle East.

The Ecotopian storyline ends with the Party making Lou's solar cell technology available to the public, and a constitutional convention where the region decides to secede from the U.S. following the Quebec-Canada model.

The book Ecotopia begins about 20 years after secession, when the new nation is securely established. Neither book describes events in between, such as the political difficulties of secession, the economic dislocations and outmigration from the region, and the Helicopter War with the U.S. (referred to in Ecotopia).

== Comparison of Ecotopia Emerging and Ecotopia ==
As a prequel to Ecotopia, EE uses some of the same characters as Ecotopia, principally Vera Allwen and Marissa D’Amato (later the girlfriend of Ecotopia’s narrator). However, there are important differences between the books.

1. The format is different. Ecotopia is the account of a trip to Ecotopia by a U.S. reporter, William Weston, and is told entirely from his point of view. EE alternates a straightforward narrative history of the United States and the Survivalist Party with novelistic snapshots of key events in the lives of some future Ecotopians.
2. Ecotopia was written in the middle 1970s, when American writers were trying to imagine how to reconstruct society after the 1960s revolutions. It focuses on the achieved Ecotopian society, not on the problems of the (remaining) United States. EE was published in 1981 and has a darker tone. It focuses as much on the dysfunctional U.S. political and economic system as it does on the actions of the future Ecotopians. Most of its ‘predictions’ for the U.S. future have turned out to be prescient, such as “From the eighties onward the business mentality triumphed.” (p. 42)
3. Ecotopia describes a steady-state society. Only the narrator changes as the book progresses. EE is a history; its characters, institutions and society change over time.
4. Ecotopia has been criticized for only presenting life in Northern California. EE has a broader scope, and includes all three states.

== Critical reaction ==
EE has received little critical attention. One critic points out that independence is achieved too easily. "In Ecotopia Emerging, the internal contradictions of existing North American capitalism do feature strongly in creating the impetus for change. However, little account is offered of how such dynamics would surely also ensure stubborn resistance to such change (nuclear blackmail notwithstanding) – in this emerging ecotopia, big business’s capitulation to idealists seems abject and fairly complete.”
