= Ernest Callenbach =

American novelist

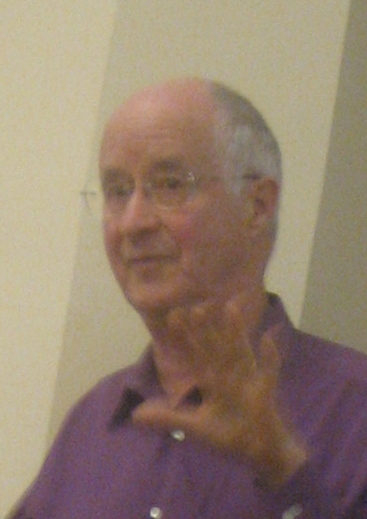
- Ernest Callenbach in 2008
- Born: Ernest William Callenbach; April 3, 1929; Williamsport, Pennsylvania, U.S.
- Died: April 16, 2012 (aged 83); Berkeley, California, U.S.

Philosophical work
- School: Green Philosophy
- Main interests: Ecology; Conservation biology; Environmental movement; Soft energy path; Technology; Urban planning; Simple living; Organic agriculture; Natural history literature; Cooperativism; Work-life balance; Film; Western American literature; Vernacular design

Ernest William Callenbach (April 3, 1929 – April 16, 2012) was an American author, film critic, editor, and simple living adherent. Having many connections with a group of noted creative individuals in Northern California, Callenbach's influence beyond the region began with the publication of his utopian novel Ecotopia in 1975.

== Life and work ==
Born in a rural area just outside Williamsport, Pennsylvania, Callenbach was the eldest son of a Professor of Agriculture at State College. At 17, he entered the University of Chicago, where he was drawn into the then 'new wave' of serious attention to film as an art form. After six months in Paris at the Sorbonne, watching four films a day, he returned to Chicago and earned a master's degree in English and Communications.

Callenbach then moved to California. From 1955 to 1991, he was on the staff of the University of California Press (Berkeley). A general editor for a number of years, he was also Editor-in-Chief of the Press's Film Quarterly from 1958 until 1991. He occasionally taught film courses at U.C. and at San Francisco State University.

For many years Callenbach edited the Natural History Guides at the U.C. Press where he began to take environmental issues and their connections to human value systems, social patterns, and lifestyles just as seriously as he had taken film. He was heavily influenced by Edward Abbey and talked publicly about being influenced, during work on his novel Ecotopia, by numerous streams of thought: scientific discoveries in the fields of ecology and conservation biology; the urban-ecology planning movement, concerned with an approach to urban planning; and the soft-energy movement, championed by Amory Lovins and others.

Callenbach is known as an author of green books, namely as author of the ecological "utopias" Ecotopia (1975) and Ecotopia Emerging (1981), and also The Ecotopian Encyclopedia (1981), Bring Back the Buffalo! (1995), and Ecology: A Pocket Guide (1998). (While his first novel popularized the term "ecotopia," the term was coined by the ethnographer E. N. Anderson.)

In terms of concepts of human involvement with the ecology, as well as some of the economic and social concepts, the Ecotopia books are related to what is known as the sustainability movement. Callenbach's Ecotopian concept is not "Luddite" — he does not reject high technology, but rather his fictional society shows a conscious selectivity about technology. In Ecotopia ecologically compatible high-technology exists alongside postmaterialistic attitudes and lifestyles. As an example, with its emphasis on personal rather than impersonal interaction, Callenbach's Ecotopian society anticipates the development and liberal usage of videoconferencing.

Indeed, for all his involvement with print publishing, Callenbach remained quite interested in visual media. Aspects of his book Ecotopia in some ways anticipated C-SPAN — which came into being a few years later — because in the story the daily life of the legislature and some of that of the judicial courts is televised in this fictional society, and televised debates (including technical debates concerning ecological problems) meet a need and desire among citizens.

Callenbach was a part of the circle of West Coast technologists, architects, social thinkers, and scientists which included Ursula K. Le Guin, Sim Van der Ryn, Peter Calthorpe, Stewart Brand, Kevin Kelly, J. Baldwin, and John Todd. As with some of these others, he was often a speaker, discussion panellist, and essayist. His engagements were both abroad and in the U.S.

In 2006, Callenbach introduced the story of a real-world community movement in Japan that is reminiscent, in its aims and practices, of his Ecotopian society. He visited Japan and investigated the Yamagishi movement. He found that it encompassed some three dozen intentional communities founded on the same underlying principles: living an ecologically based integration of people with agriculture (pig, cattle, and chicken livestock raising, and organic-vegetable and fruit farming), and living a social life based on principles of democracy, mutual understanding, support, and health. Each individual settlement is referred to as jikkenji ('demonstration community for the world').

In 2009, Callenbach was awarded an honorary doctorate by the University of Freiburg. Freiburg is noted for its renewable energy industry and has been called a "green utopia". He died of cancer on April 16, 2012, in Berkeley, California.

== Quotes ==
...if you reflect on our change from thoughtless trash-tossing to virtually universal recycling, or from the past in which smokers didn't hesitate to blow smoke in anybody's face to our present restrictions on smoking in public places, it's clear that shared ideas about acceptable or desirable behavior can change markedly. Such changes occurred without anybody getting arrested in the dark of night. Further changes will come...

== Bibliography ==
- Living Poor With Style (New York: Bantam, 1972)
- Ecotopia (Banyan Tree Books, 1975)
  - Italian translation: Ecotopia (Castelvecchi Editore, 2012)
- Ecotopia Emerging (Banyan Tree Books, 1981)
- The Ecotopian Encyclopaedia for the 80's: A Survival Guide for the Age of Inflation (Berkeley: And/Or Press, 1981)
- A Citizen Legislature (Bookpeople, 1985; rev. ed. Imprint Academic, 2008)
- Publisher's Lunch (Ten Speed Press, 1989)
- Ecology: A Pocket Guide (U. of California Press, 1998; rev. ed. 2008)
- Living Cheaply With Style: Live Better and Spend Less (Berkeley: Ronin, 1993). ISBN 0-914171-61-5
- Living Cheaply With Style: Live Better and Spend Less, Second edition (Berkeley: Ronin, 2000). ISBN 1-57951-014-0
- Bring Back the Buffalo!: A Sustainable Future for America's Great Plains (U. of California Press, 2000)
