= Interstitial federalism =

Interstitial federalism is a term for institutions and practices which fill jurisdictional gaps between levels of government in federal political systems. The term can be used descriptively, to describe governance gaps between national and regional governments filled by institutions distinct from both levels, and prescriptively, to assess how these practices change federal systems over time. Interstitial federalism was first defined by Rhett B. Larson in 2015 to critique the governance of common-pool resources which cross political boundaries in the United States. Since then, the concept has also been used to analyze Indigenous governance in Canada.

== Origins ==
Interstitial federalism was first defined by legal scholar Rhett B. Larson in 2015. In his paper "Interstitial Federalism", Larson describes how existing challenges with managing common-pool resources such as wildlife, forests, and water in the United States are intensified when they cross state lines. Common-pool resources, which become scarce when over-consumed but are difficult to exclude others from consuming, often require management to prevent overuse and degradation by self-interested individuals. Economists such as Elinor Ostrom have demonstrated that successful institutions set up to govern common-pool resources benefit from clearly defined boundaries and monitoring. In federal systems, however, where governance is shared between national and regional governments, neither level of government may be fully suited to managing "spillover commons": common-pool resources which cross regional boundaries. Larson uses watershed management in the United States as an example where state governments are too small to fully govern water resources which extend beyond their borders, and the federal government is too large and remote to do so efficiently, creating a need for appropriately-sized river basin commissions established through interstate compacts. Throughout his critique of American trans-boundary water management institutions, Larson uses the term "interstitial federalism" to define the level of governance which fills the gaps between federal and state jurisdiction. Since the publication of Interstitial Federalism, Larson and others have continued to use the concept in a resource management context, and legal scholar Robert Hamilton has notably extended the concept to discuss how Indigenous institutions can fill jurisdictional and governance gaps in Canadian federalism.

Interstitial federalism follows earlier uses of the term "interstitial" to describe jurisdictional gap-filling in legal and political contexts. Since the early 20^{th} century, judges and legal scholars in Canada and the United States have discussed "interstitial lawmaking" in writing about the role of the judiciary in statutory interpretation, particularly the extent to which judges or regulatory agencies should proactively fill gaps left by legislative ambiguity. Similar language has also been used to articulate the extent to which state courts should fill gaps in federal common law jurisprudence. More recently, Marxist sociologists have developed theories of "interstitial transformation" and "interstitial revolution" to analyze how non-capitalist social movements can develop alternative power structures in the gaps within and between formal levels of government. Interstitial federalism shares its emphasis on the spaces between political entities with these related concepts, and has been used to advocate for change inside and outside of dominant state power structures.

== Relationship to theories of federalism ==
Interstitial federalism's focus on gaps between levels of government distinguishes it from other types of federalism. Dual federalism, which frames national and regional governments as separate sovereign entities who each exercise their own clearly-defined powers, stands in contrast to interstitial federalism's focus on institutions outside or between each level of government. Cooperative federalism, which emphasizes the delegation or sharing of power between levels of government for mutual benefit, is more closely related: interstitial institutions may be created through national-regional cooperation and managed through shared governance. Still, interstitial federalism is distinct from cooperative approaches because allows that political expression within gaps can be more independent than simply an expression of regional and national cooperation. For instance, Robert Hamilton writes that by de-emphasizing the national-regional binary, interstitial federalism facilitates discussions of how groups such as Indigenous peoples can define forms of sovereignty distinct from both levels of government. Finally, interstitial federalism may involve unequal power relations like in asymmetric federalism, where regions in a federal state have different authority, without requiring all parties to be governments clearly defined within the federal system.

== Applications ==
Interstitial federalism has mostly been applied to two disciplines: trans-boundary resource management (mainly in the United States) and Indigenous sovereignty and governance in Canada.

=== Resource Management ===
Rhett B. Larson's 2015 article "Interstitial Federalism", the first to propose interstitial federalism as a distinct framework, analyzes river basin commissions which cross state boundaries in the United States. After defining the concept, Larson uses several case studies to critique basin commissions which are too weak or poorly specified to resolve interstate disputes, or whose mandates are too broad, resulting in power imbalances between member states and checks to their power by federal courts. Despite critiquing several of these interstitial institutions, Larson's main prescription is nonetheless that interstitial water management holds enormous promise as long as it is pursued at the correct scale, and as long as institutions are sufficiently empowered and deferred to by governments at the state and federal level. Larson concludes his article by advocating for better funded river basin commissions with clear boundaries and jurisdictions, stronger mandates, and fiduciary duties to share benefits equitably among members. Since the publication of Interstitial Federalism, Larson has further explored how lessons in sub-national interstitial water management could be applied at the international level.

Outside of Larson's scholarship, interstitial federalism continues to be applied in literature on water management and law. At the sub-national level in the United States, the coordination and benefit sharing advantages of properly empowered river basin commissions have been used to advocate for interstitial water management of the Mississippi River Basin through an interstate compact. At the same time, certain scholars warn that interstitial water management will become more difficult as water supplies are constrained by climate change, pollution, and other anthropogenic effects. The potential for international interstitial river basin management based on interstitial federalism has also been questioned due to weak enforcement potential under international law.

=== Indigenous Sovereignty in Canada ===
Interstitial federalism has also been used by legal scholar Robert Hamilton to analyze the evolution of Indigenous sovereignty and self-determination in Canada. In his 2019 article "Indigenous Peoples and Interstitial Federalism in Canada", Hamilton argues that Canadian courts and governments have not clearly established whether Section 35 of Canada's Constitution Act, 1982 guarantees a right to Indigenous self-government. Absent a clear definition of Indigenous sovereignty with respect to Canadian federalism, Hamilton proposes interstitial federalism as a framework to understand how Indigenous peoples have exercised self-determination in gaps between federal and provincial jurisdiction, and how these practices have shaped and continue to shape Canadian federalism over time. He uses interstitial federalism to describe institutions between Indigenous peoples and settler governments such as modern treaties and environmental co-management boards, as well as fully Indigenous institutions such as tribal parks or inter-Indigenous treaties, which are defined independently by Indigenous nations without requiring formal recognition from other levels of government. Throughout his article, Hamilton argues that interstitial Indigenous institutions and practices are not merely reactions to gaps in Canada's federal system, but can also proactively assert Indigenous rights to self-government and sovereignty. Hamilton explicitly connects his vision of interstitial federalism with Erik Olin Wright's theory of interstitial social change, which emphasizes how interpreting gaps in political orders can alter norms and change systems over time. He also draws on Indigenous law scholarship which argues that Indigenous legal traditions are legitimate, continuously evolving expressions of Indigenous sovereignty which have been historically subordinated to federal and provincial law in Canada. Since Hamilton's original publication, his work has been referenced in related writing on contested Indigenous autonomy and sovereignty in Canada.
