= The Lobster Coast =

2004 non-fiction book by Colin Woodard

- Author: Colin Woodard
- Subject: History of Maine
- Publication date: 2004

The Lobster Coast is a 2004 book by Colin Woodard that serves as an overview of the history of Maine. The Bangor Daily News called it "thought-provoking" and "provocative", while Publishers Weekly compared it to William W. Warner's 1976 Beautiful Swimmers.
