= Tipping point (sociology) =

Point in time when a group rapidly and dramatically changes its behaviour

In sociology, a tipping point is a point in time when a group—or many group members—rapidly and dramatically changes its behavior by widely adopting a previously rare practice.

== History ==
The phrase was first used in sociology by Morton Grodzins when he adopted the phrase from physics where it referred to the adding a small amount of weight to a balanced object until the additional weight caused the object to suddenly and completely topple, or tip. Grodzins studied integrating American neighborhoods in the early 1960s. He discovered that most of the white families remained in the neighborhood as long as the comparative number of black families remained very small. But, at a certain point, when "one too many" black families arrived, the remaining white families would move out en masse in a process known as white flight. He called that moment the "tipping point".

The idea was expanded and built upon by Nobel Prize-winner Thomas Schelling in 1971. A similar idea underlies Mark Granovetter's threshold model of collective behavior.

== Other uses ==
The phrase has extended beyond its original meaning and been applied to any process in which, beyond a certain point, the rate of the process increases dramatically. It has been applied in many fields, from economics to human ecology to epidemiology. It can also be compared to phase transition in physics or the propagation of populations in an unbalanced ecosystem.

Journalists and academics have applied the phrase to dramatic changes in governments, such as during the Arab Spring. The concept of a tipping point is described in an article in an academic journal, the Journal of Democracy, titled "China at the Tipping Point? Foreseeing the unforeseeable":

Regime transitions belong to that paradoxical class of events which are inevitable but not predictable. Other examples are bank runs, currency inflations, strikes, migrations, riots, and revolutions. In retrospect, such events are explainable, even overdetermined. In prospect, however, their timing and character are impossible to anticipate. Such events seem to come closer and closer but do not occur, even when all the conditions are ripe—until suddenly they do.

American journalists at NPR have used it to describe an influx of sexual assault allegations, saying that a tipping point has been passed regarding societal tolerance of sexual harassment and feminism.

Mathematically, the angle of repose may be seen as a bifurcation. In control theory, the concept of positive feedback describes the same phenomenon, with the problem of balancing an inverted pendulum being the classic embodiment. The concept has also been applied to the popular acceptance of new technologies, for example being used to explain the success of VHS over Betamax.

=== Decarbonization ===
The concept of social tipping points has been applied to analyze global decarbonization pathways and the ability to activate contagious and fast-spreading processes of social and technological change that would accelerate carbon emission reductions needed to achieve the goals of the Paris Agreement.

A study suggests, "path dependencies, increasing returns to scale and learning-by-doing cost reductions can produce sudden, tipping-point-like transitions that cannot be extrapolated from past system behaviour", and that "historically, technological innovation and government policies often motivated by energy security concerns have also, in notable cases, spurred rapid shifts in energy systems".

Moreover, "social norms that shape individual behaviour and preferences can exhibit similar tipping-point style dynamics", which could affect "the regulatory and market conditions in which energy technologies compete". When social norms of sustainability are costly – or at least detrimental rather than beneficial – for individuals to violate, this may substantially increase the probability that an individual engages in pro-environmental behaviour.

Researchers identify key social tipping points regarding environmental challenges. Here are the subdomains where targeted interventions can trigger fast transitions toward net-zero emissions.

- Fossil fuels: Regulations restricting the use of fossil fuels can take various forms. For example, sector-specific regulations or bans on fossil-fuel advertising help to eliminate fossil fuels from most sectors of society.
- Climate information: Providing more systemic information regarding greenhouse gas emissions on products and services contributes to raising awareness around health and ecological risks.
- Finance: Through tools such as carbon taxes and divestment, fossil-fuel assets becomes less financially attractive compared to clean energy sources.
- Education: The integration of environment-related issues into school curricula contributes to increasing public awareness.
- Social norms: Making the moral implications of fossil fuels more visible enables the majority of the population to change their perceptions and, ultimately, their consumption ahbits.
- Cities: Building carbon-neutral cities can educate the general public and drive consumer interest in emerging clean technologies.

== In popular culture ==
The term was popularized in application to daily life by Canadian journalist Malcolm Gladwell's 2000 bestselling book The Tipping Point: How Little Things Can Make a Big Difference.

== See also ==
- Cascading failure – Systemic risk of failure
- Catastrophe theory – Area of mathematics
- Chaos theory – Field of mathematics and science based on non-linear systems and initial conditions
- Critical mass – Self-sustaining action that creates growth
- Domino effect – Cumulative effect produced when one event sets off a chain of other events
- Emergence – Unpredictable phenomenon in complex systems
- Hundredth monkey effect – Claim that new ideas spread without communication
- Information cascade – Behavioral phenomenon
- Inflection point – Point where the curvature of a curve changes sign
- Micromotives and Macrobehavior – American economist (1921–2016)
- Microtrends: The Small Forces Behind Tomorrow's Big Changes – 2007 book by Mark Penn and Kinney Zalesne
- Network effect – Increasing value with increasing participation
- Saddle-node bifurcation – Local bifurcation in which two fixed points of a dynamical system collide and anni
- Self-fulfilling prophecy – Prediction that causes itself to become true
- Straw that broke the camel's back – English idiom, the "last straw"
- Traffic congestion – Transport condition characterized by slower speed and high density
- Viral phenomenon – Self-replicating objects or patterns
- Virtuous circle and vicious circle – Self-reinforcing sequence of events
