= Albion's Seed =

1989 book by David Hackett Fischer

Albion's Seed: Four British Folkways in America
- First edition
- Author: David Hackett Fischer
- Cover artist: Unknown artist, "The Cholmondeley Ladies", c.1600–10
- Subject: American social history
- Publisher: Oxford University Press
- Publication date: 1989
- Publication place: United States
- Pages: 946
- ISBN: 978-0-19-506905-1

Albion's Seed: Four British Folkways in America is a 1989 book by David Hackett Fischer that details the folkways of four groups of people who moved from distinct regions of Great Britain (Albion) to the United States. Fischer's argument is that the culture of each of the groups persisted, to provide the basis for the political culture of the modern United States. Fischer explains "the origins and stability of a social system which for two centuries has remained stubbornly democratic in its politics, capitalist in its economy, libertarian in its laws and individualist in its society and pluralistic in its culture."

Albion's Seed was intended to be the first book in a planned five-volume series, America: A Cultural History. The second volume was to have been American Plantations.

== Four folkways ==
The four migrations are discussed in the four main chapters of the book:

- East Anglia to Massachusetts

The Exodus of the English Puritans (Pilgrims and Puritans influenced the Northeastern United States' corporate and educational culture)

- The South of England to Virginia

The Cavaliers and Indentured Servants (Gentry influenced the Southern United States' plantation culture)

- North Midlands to the Delaware Valley

The Friends' Migration (Quakers influenced the Middle Atlantic and Midwestern United States' industrial culture)

- Borderlands to the Backcountry

The Flight from North Britain (Scotch-Irish and border English influenced the Western United States' ranch culture and the Southern United States' common agrarian culture)

Fischer includes satellite peoples such as Welsh, Scots, Irish, Dutch, French, Germans, Italians and a treatise on African slaves in South Carolina. Fischer covers voting patterns and dialects of speech in four regions that span from their Atlantic colonial base to the Pacific.

Fischer remarks on his own connective feelings between the Chesapeake and Southern England in Albion's Seed but attempts to flesh them out in Bound Away: Virginia and the Westward Movement, a corollary of his work in the book.

=== Origins ===
Fischer states that the book's purpose is to examine the complex cultural processes at work within the four folkways during the time period. Albion's Seed argues, "The legacy of four British folkways in early America remains the most powerful determinant of a voluntary society in the United States."

The term "folkways" was originally coined by William Graham Sumner, a 19th-century American sociologist. Sumner's treatise Folkways: A Study of the Sociological Importance of Usages, Manners, Customs, Mores, and Morals posits:

The folkways are habits of the individual and customs of the society which arise from efforts to satisfy needs; they are intertwined with goblinism and demonism and primitive notions of luck (sec. 6), and so they win traditional authority. Then they become regulative for succeeding generations and take on the character of a social force. They arise no one knows whence or how. They grow as if by the play of internal life energy. They can be modified, but only to a limited extent, by the purposeful efforts of men. In time they lose power, decline, and die, or are transformed. While they are in vigor they very largely control individual and social undertakings, and they produce and nourish ideas of world philosophy and life policy. Yet they are not organic or material. They belong to a superorganic system of relations, conventions, and institutional arrangements.

=== Key characteristics ===
Fischer describes his modified application of the folkways concept as "the normative structure of values, customs and meanings that exist in any culture," which rise from social and intellectual origins. More specifically, Fischer's definition of folkways are that they "are often highly persistent, but they are never static. Even where they have acquired the status of a tradition they are not necessarily very old. Folkways are constantly in the process of creation, even in our own time."

Each of the four distinct folkways is comparatively described and defined in the following terms:

- Speech Ways: "Conventional patterns of written and spoken language; pronunciation, vocabulary, syntax and grammar."
- Building Ways: "Prevailing forms of vernacular architecture and high architecture, which tend to be related to one another."
- Family Ways: "The structure and function of the household and family, both in ideal and actuality."
- Marriage Ways: "Ideas of the marriage-bond, and cultural processes of courtship, marriage and divorce."
- Gender Ways: "Customs that regulate social relations between men and women."
- Sex Ways: "Conventional sexual attitudes and acts, and the treatment of sexual deviance."
- Child-Rearing Ways: "Ideas of child nature and customs of child nurture."
- Naming Ways: "Onomastic customs including favoured forenames and the descent of names within the family."
- Age Ways: "Attitudes towards age, experiences of aging and age relationships."
- Death Ways: "Attitudes towards death, mortality rituals, mortuary customs and mourning practices."
- Religious Ways: "Patterns of religious worship, theology, ecclesiology and church architecture."
- Magic Ways: "Normative beliefs and practices concerning the supernatural."
- Learning Ways: "Attitudes toward literacy and learning, and conventional patterns of education."
- Food Ways: "Patterns of diet, nutrition, cooking, eating, feasting and fasting."
- Dress Ways: "Customs of dress, demeanor, and personal adornment."
- Sport Ways: "Attitudes toward recreation and leisure; folk games and forms of organized sport."
- Work Ways: "Work ethics and work experiences; attitudes toward work and the nature of work."
- Time Ways: "Attitudes toward the use of time, customary methods of time keeping, and the conventional rhythms of life."
- Wealth Ways: "Attitudes towards wealth and patterns of its distribution."
- Rank Ways: "The rules by which rank is assigned, the roles which rank entails, and the relations between different ranks."
- Social Ways: "Conventional patterns of migration, settlement, association and affiliation."
- Order Ways: "Ideas of order, ordering institutions, forms of disorder, and treatment of the disorderly."
- Power Ways: "Attitudes toward authority and power; patterns of political participation."
- Freedom Ways: "Prevailing ideas of liberty and restraint, and libertarian customs and institutions."

== Reception ==
Collin Brooks of the University of Sussex holds that Albion's Seed is an "extraordinary project." Brooks criticizes the chronologically fuzzy "allocation and delimitation of regional identities" and understatement of geography's effect on the cultures, but believes that Fischer succeeded in his effort to prove the existence of American regional cultures.

Charles Joyner, professor of history at Coastal Carolina University, describes the book as "stunning but problematic". Joyner praises the interdisciplinary approach that Fischer takes in Albion's Seed, but considers Fischer's analysis of linguistic patterns to be weak and poorly supported. Although Joyner is critical of "the curiously static quality of the folk culture that it portrays", his general summary is that "Albion's Seed is a book of astonishing depth, power, and feeling, filled with stimulating insights".

Jack Sosin, professor of history at the University of Nebraska-Lincoln, points out that many scholars contest regional cultural differences as being determinants of political behavior. He criticizes the research and evidence presented by Fischer, writing that some of it is questionable, some is uneven, some is unsubstantiated, and some are generalizations based on single studies or episodes.

Gordon McKinney, a professor of Appalachian history at Berea College, took issue with Fischer's treatment of Appalachian culture due to his use of out-of-date sources, lack of specificity with regard to the time period, and denial of change. McKinney holds that "the conclusion that we are forced to draw about Fischer's contribution to the understanding of the origins of the Appalachian South must be mixed.. some of his specific conclusions are based on sound primary research and are valuable additions to our understanding of early Appalachian history. But Fischer's incomplete research leaves his study resting on a weak foundation."

Wilbur Zelinsky, cultural geography professor at Pennsylvania State University, argues that Albion's Seed faces two "essential weakness": that it "suffers from a form of tunnel vision" by ignoring the work of historical geographers, and that it falls victim to logical fallacies like "adherence to a Single-Factor Explanation for all complexities of American history and geography."

Nick Burns, writing in The New Statesman, describes Albion's Seed as an attempt "to rehabilitate [...] the race-science-tinctured, 19th-century 'Teutonic germ' theory" at the expense of more modern creedal or intellectual models of American nationhood. Calling the book a favorite of the "online right", Burns compares it negatively with The Barbarous Years, an account of early American settlement by Bernard Bailyn.

== Impact ==
The book has won a number of awards including the American Association of University Presses prize for overall excellence in 1996.

== See also ==
- American Nations: A History of the Eleven Rival Regional Cultures of North America
- Louis Hartz's "fragment thesis", which proposes that the political cultures of the New World countries depends on when, and by whom they were colonized
- The Nine Nations of North America
- Wilbur Zelinsky
