= Jesusland map =

Satirical political map of North America

A recreation of the Jesusland map; the colors differ from the original, and state lines have been added "United States of Canada": Canada, plus the blue states that voted for John Kerry in the 2004 United States presidential election "Jesusland", the red states that voted for George W. Bush in the 2004 United States presidential election

Some versions of the map include the Canadian province of Alberta, known for its conservative politics, in Jesusland

The Jesusland map is an Internet meme created shortly after the 2004 U.S. presidential election that satirizes the red/blue states scheme by dividing the United States and Canada into "The United States of Canada" and "Jesusland". The map implies the existence of a fundamental political divide between contiguous northern and southern regions of North America, the former including both the socially liberal Canada and the West Coast, Northeastern, and Upper Midwestern U.S. states, and suggests that these states are closer in spirit to Canada than to the more conservative regions of their own country, which are characterized by the influence of Christian fundamentalism in their political and popular culture. The Freakonomics blog opined that the map reflected the "despair, division, and bitterness" of the election campaign and results. Slate also covered the image and posited that it might be the reason the Canadian immigration website received six times its usual page views the day after the 2004 election.

== Origin ==
The original image was created on November 3, 2004, the day after the election, by G. Webb, a poster on yakyak.org, an Internet message board for fans of the work of Jeff Minter. It quickly became an Internet meme, which The New York Times described as an "instant Internet classic".

== Geography ==
The meme is in the form of a map of the U.S. and Canada which depicts a new hypothetical national border between the two countries. The "blue states" from the 2004 election (New England, the Mid-Atlantic states, the Pacific coast, and the Great Lakes states of Illinois, Michigan, Minnesota, and Wisconsin) have been merged with Canada to form a single contiguous nation of more than 170 million inhabitants, which is labeled the "United States of Canada". The remaining "red states" are labeled "Jesusland". Some versions of the map include Alberta as part of "Jesusland" due to the province's predominantly conservative politics.

== See also ==
- Bible Belt – Cultural region of the United States
- Blue wall (United States) – States that consistently vote for the Democratic Party in U.S. elections
- Cascadia movement – Movement for greater autonomy in the Pacific Northwest
- Deep South – Cultural region of the United States
- Ecotopia – 1975 novel by Ernest Callenbach
- Left Coast – American pejorative political expression
- The Nine Nations of North America – 1981 book by Joel Garreau
- Královec Region
