= Political culture of the United States =

The political culture of the United States has been influenced by the various European nations which colonized the Americas from the 15th century onwards. During the colonial era of American history, European settlers began emigrating to Colonial America, influencing the political culture in each region they settled in. These influences continued to play a major role in the politics of the United States after the American Revolution and the establishment of the U.S. as an independent country.

== Research on the political culture of the US ==
The political scientist Daniel J. Elazar identified three primary political cultures, generally consistent with those of Alexis de Tocqueville. Moralistic political culture evolved out of New England and is characterized by an emphasis of community and civic virtue over individualism. Individualistic political culture arose from Dutch influence in the Mid-Atlantic region; it regards multiculturalism as a practicality and government as a utilitarian necessity. Traditionalistic political culture arose in the South, which elevates social order and family structure to a prominent role. It accepts a natural hierarchy in society and where necessary to protect society, authoritarian leadership in the political and religious realms.

The formation of traditionalistic political culture is often thought to have arisen principally out of Virginia, the first and most populous southern colony. Virginia was also the most politically powerful state after the American Revolution: pursuant to the first census of the United States in 1790 it held a greater percentage of congressional representatives than any other state has ever enjoyed up to the present day. Nevertheless, others argue that South Carolina had the greater influence as a result of its Grand Model enabling slaveholders from Barbados to establish a durable aristocracy. That unique convergence produced a slave society with a majority black population rigidly controlled by the plantation elite. Maintaining such a society required intense political resolve and the development of a mythology of white racial supremacy. The South Carolina hybrid model ultimately spread across the Deep South and was unwavering in its promotion of southern culture, whereas Virginia and other Upper South states were less comfortable with the region's “peculiar institution” of slavery.

The political scientist Richard Ellis identified egalitarianism, individualism, and hierarchy as defining cultures in American political culture. These principal categories correspond closely with Elazar's classification. According to Ellis, each of these cultures lays claim to the ideals of equality and liberty articulated by John Locke, but what they are claiming is an only a piece of Locke, and one that is not necessarily consistent with the whole.

Popular authors have found similar divisions within American political culture. Colin Woodard identified eleven “rival regional cultures,” while Joel Garreau identified nine.

The social psychologist Peter J. Rentfrow led a research effort that generally supports Elazar's theory of political culture, while finding that psychological variables allow for a more fine-grained geographical analysis. His research on “psychological topography” was based on multiple samples of more than a million respondents. The researchers found “overwhelming evidence for regional variation across the United States on a range of key political, economic, social, and health indicators.”

When compared to Europe, America's political culture is more conservative and religious. Gallup has found that self-identification as conservative or liberal among Americans since 1992 has remained relatively consistent. In 2025, it found "an average of 35% describing their political views as 'very conservative' or 'conservative,' 33% as 'moderate,' and 28% as 'very liberal' or 'liberal.'" It described the amount of people identifying as moderate decreasing from an average of 43% in 1992 to 33% in 2025, and those identifying as liberal increasing from 17% in 1992 to 25% in 2016, where they have since remained steady. On religion, Gallup found in 2018 that U.S. Christians (the largest religious group in the U.S.) and non-Christians were much more likely to state that they regularly pray, attend church services, and believe in God and it's power compared to Western Europeans.

== Colonial origins ==
The American political culture is rooted in the colonial experience and the American Revolution. The colonies were unique within the European world for their vibrant political culture, which attracted ambitious young men into politics. At the time, American suffrage was the most widespread in the world, with every man who owned a certain amount of property allowed to vote. In the mother country of Britain, fewer than 1% of men could vote, but in the American colonies most white men were eligible. While the roots of democracy were apparent, deference was typically shown to social elites in colonial elections, although this declined sharply with the American Revolution. In each colony a wide range of public and private business was decided by elected bodies, especially the assemblies and county governments. Topics of public concern and debate included land grants, commercial subsidies, and taxation, as well as the oversight of roads, poor relief, taverns, and schools. Americans spent a great deal of time in court, as private lawsuits were very common. Legal affairs were overseen by local judges and juries, with a central role for trained lawyers. This promoted the rapid expansion of the legal profession, and the dominant role of lawyers in politics was apparent by the 1770s, with notable individuals including John Adams and Thomas Jefferson, among many others.

The American colonies were unique in world context because of the growth of representation of different interest groups. Unlike Europe, where the royal court, aristocratic families and the established church were in control, the American political culture was open to merchants, landlords, petty farmers, artisans, Anglicans, Presbyterians, Quakers, Germans, Scotch Irish, Yankees, Yorkers, and many other identifiable groups. Over 90% of the representatives elected to the legislature lived in their districts, unlike England where it was common to have a member of Parliament who lived elsewhere. Finally, and most dramatically, the Americans were fascinated by and increasingly adopted the political values of Republicanism, which stressed equal rights, the need for virtuous citizens, and the evils of corruption, luxury, and aristocracy. None of the colonies had political parties of the sort that formed in the 1790s, but each had shifting factions that vied for power.

== American Revolution and after ==
=== Concepts of the Founding Fathers ===
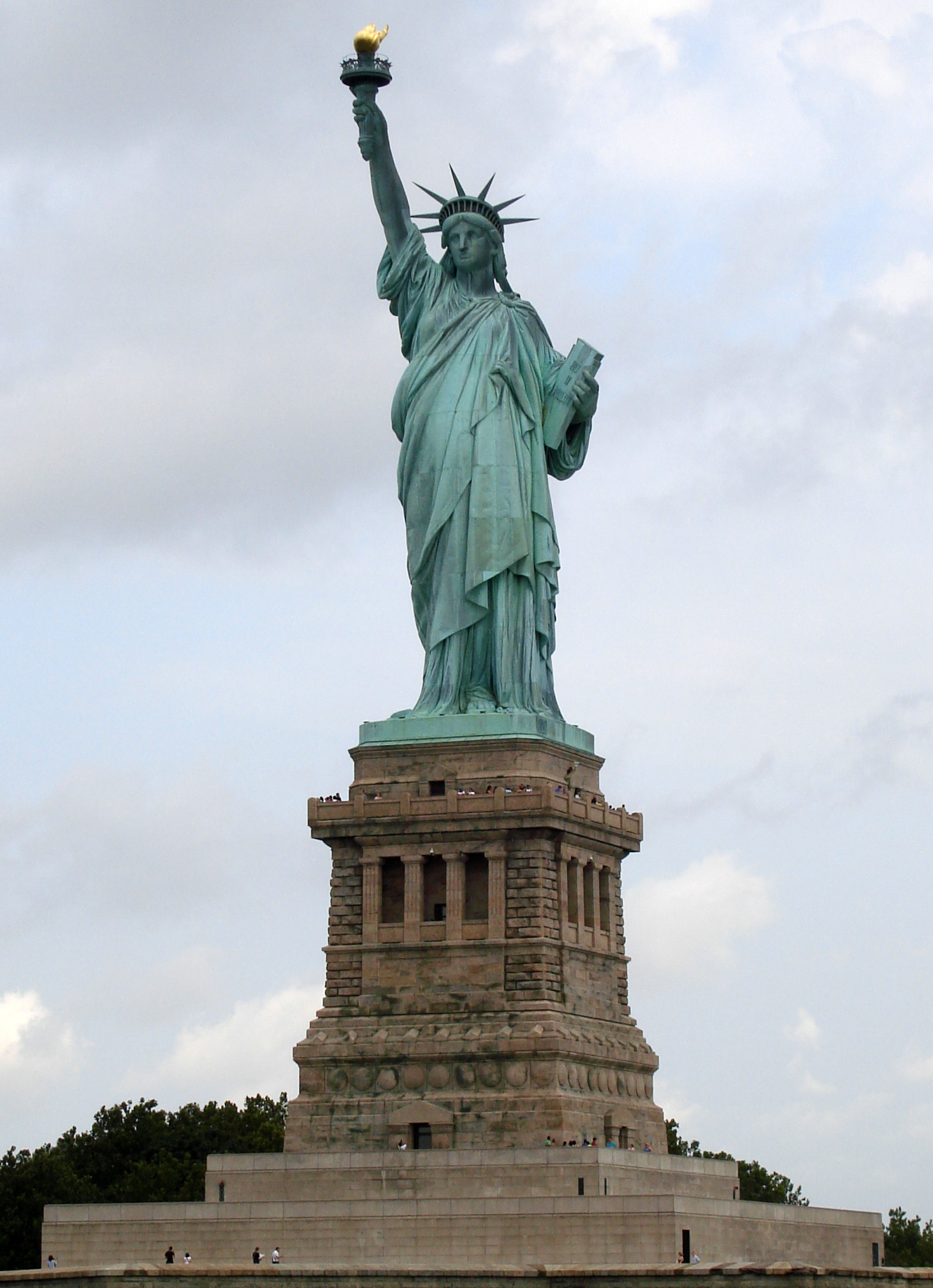
The Statue of Liberty, a symbol of American freedom and openness to immigration

Two pivotal political ideas in the establishment of the United States were Republicanism and classical liberalism. Central documents of American thought include: the Declaration of Independence (1776), the Constitution (1787), the Federalist and Anti-Federalist Papers (1787-1790s), the Bill of Rights (1791), and Lincoln's "Gettysburg Address" (1863).

Among the core tenets were:

- Civic duty: citizens have the responsibility to understand and support the government, participate in elections, pay taxes, and perform military service. "Positive liberty" included moral and civic duties, or "what the Founders called 'republican virtue.'”
- Opposition to Political corruption.
- Democracy: The government should be answerable to citizens, who may change the representatives through elections.
- Equality before the law: The laws should attach no special privilege to any citizen. Government officials are subject to the law just as others are.
- Freedom of religion: The government should neither support nor suppress any or all religion.
- Freedom of speech: The government should not restrict through law or action the personal, non-violent speech of a citizen; a marketplace of ideas.

=== Appalachian and frontier political culture ===
Many settlers who populated the South took to the backcountry, eventually crossing the Appalachians. Of these, the Scots-Irish originating from the Plantation areas of Ireland and the border region between England and Scotland were among the largest and most influential. A Hessian officer reported during the American Revolution that "Call this war by whatever name you may, only call it not an American rebellion; it is nothing more or less than a Scotch Irish Presbyterian rebellion." While they might be considered a distinct political culture in colonial times, they eventually developed a symbiotic relationship with the Southern planter elite. As W. J. Cash wrote in The Mind of the South, “the tradition of aristocracy met and married with the tradition of the backwoods.”

The Frontier Thesis advanced by the historian Frederick Jackson Turner in 1893 argued that American culture, including political culture, was forged as Americans expanded westward. It was violent and individualistic and yet contained a primitive form of egalitarianism. In Elazar's view, however, it was the South that acquired these traits most and carried them west to Missouri, Texas, and eventually as far as Southern California.

=== Lockean liberalism and political culture ===
In another unifying thesis about political culture that, like the Frontier Thesis, some have argued that Lockean liberalism is a central underlying explanation of American political culture. Notably, the political scientist Louis Hartz argued that the nation's founding principles, which were largely drawn from Locke, created a new political culture that was unique to the United States. The nation “begins with Locke,” he wrote, and it “stays with Locke.” He found that Alexis de Tocqueville was first to recognize this when he saw that the nation was the first to create its own democratic future without having to endure revolution.

== Post-World War II ==
At the time of the United States' founding, the economy was predominantly one of agriculture and small private businesses, and state governments left welfare issues to private or local initiative. As in the UK and other industrialized countries, laissez-faire ideology was largely discredited during the Great Depression. Between the 1930s and 1970s, fiscal policy was characterized by the Keynesian consensus, a time during which the concepts of modern American liberalism dominated economic policy almost unchallenged. Since the mid-1970s, however, laissez-faire ideology has once more become a powerful force in American politics. While the American welfare state expanded more than threefold after WWII, it has been at 20% of GDP since the late 1970s. Today, modern American liberalism, and modern American conservatism are engaged in a continuous political battle, characterized by what The Economist describes as "greater divisiveness [and] close, but bitterly fought elections." Since 2016, the United States has been recognized as a flawed democracy in the Democracy Index by the Economist Intelligence Unit, partially due to increased political polarization.

In foreign affairs, the United States generally pursued a noninterventionist policy of "avoiding foreign entanglements" before World War II. After the war, when America became a superpower, for many decades the country embraced internationalism, seeking allies to contain Communism and foster economic cooperation. In addition the United States and its Western allies generally promoted Capitalism and Democracy during the Cold War.

According to at least some academics, authoritarian values have strengthened in the 21st century in the U.S. and elsewhere, with long-run economic changes from globalization having a negative impact on the social identity of historically dominant groups. This increases the incentive for these groups to use authoritarianism to force minority groups to conform to social norms.

=== Urban-rural divide ===
2024 United States presidential election

Political culture can be seen as bifurcated by urban and rural geography. The United States was largely a rural nation until 1920. When the census that year revealed that urban Congressional Districts would exceed those of rural areas, rural congressmen refused to approve reapportionment, the only time that has happened. A cultural divide remains to the present with rural areas often associating with traditionalistic political culture, while urban areas are more often aligned with moralistic and individualistic political culture.

=== Re-aggregation of political cultures in metropolitan areas ===
Researchers Dante Chinni and James Gimpel identified twelve cultural communities found throughout the United States, with varying degrees of geographic concentration. The categories are derived from analysis of statistical data, and they offer a more realistic portrayal of the geographically discontinuous cultural fabric of the nation than blanket state and regional categories. In physical space, as in cyberspace, people increasingly sort themselves into communities of choice. That is, people chose where they will live and who they will communicate with. The opportunity to make such choices appears to reinforce political culture.

== See also ==
- Albion's Seed
- American exceptionalism
- City upon a Hill
- Eddington (2025 film focused on the impacts of the COVID-19 pandemic and George Floyd protests on US political culture)
- Outside agitator
- Urban–rural political divide
- Political polarization in the United States
