= Morton Grodzins =

American political scientist (1917–1964)

Morton M. Grodzins (11 August 1917 – 7 March 1964) was a professor of political science at the University of Chicago, as well as a dean of the school and an editor at University of Chicago Press. He is known for coining the term "tipping point" in studies of white flight, such as "Metropolitan Segregation" (1957) and The Metropolitan Area as a Racial Problem (1958). His theories related to Tipping Point were later made famous by Canadian journalist Malcolm Gladwell and his book, The Tipping Point. His book Americans Betrayed (1949) was the first major study criticizing the Japanese-American internment during World War II, based on his and others' work at the Japanese-American Evacuation and Resettlement Study at University of California, Berkeley. His book Making un-Americans (1955) looked at Cold War paranoia in a critical light. Owing to his concern about the threat of nuclear war, he played a leading role in the Pugwash Conferences on Science and World Affairs. He also wrote major studies of American federalism, in which he criticized the idea that the federal, state, and local governments operated distinctly from one another. He argued that the governments resembled a marble cake where the different flavors blended together rather than remaining in layers. This concept of cooperative federalism was distinct from dual federalism.

== Works ==
- Americans Betrayed: Politics and the Japanese Evacuation, 1949. Chicago: University of Chicago Press.
- "Metropolitan Segregation", 1957. Scientific American 197:33–47.
- The Metropolitan Area as a Racial Problem, 1958. Pittsburgh: University of Pittsburgh Press.
- The American System: A New View of the Government of the United States, 1966. New York: Rand McNally.
- The Federal System.
