= Radical Evolution =

2005 book by Joel Garreau

Radical Evolution: The Promise and Peril of Enhancing Our Minds, Our Bodies and What It Means to Be Human
- Cover of the first edition
- Author: Joel Garreau
- Language: English
- Published: 2005
- Publisher: Doubleday
- Publication place: United States
- Media type: Print
- ISBN: 0-385-50965-0
- OCLC: 70851640
- LC Class: T174.5 .G35 2005

Radical Evolution: The Promise and Peril of Enhancing Our Minds, Our Bodies—and What It Means to Be Human (ISBN 0-385-50965-0) is a book published in 2005 by Joel Garreau.

== Summary ==
The book is about the march toward a potentially posthuman future in which emerging technologies will allow humans to shape their bodies and minds, or possibly destroy life on earth, or even the universe. Garreau describes these as the "GRIN" technologies: genetics, robotics, information, and nanotechnology. Garreau details interviews with members of DARPA, Ray Kurzweil, and Bill Joy, among other leading technologists to offer their perspective on the forthcoming paradigm shifts of life in the decades to come, as a result of rapidly advancing technological progress, and the prospect of a Technological singularity that such exponential growth may lead to. According to Garreau, this growth is bound to lead humanity towards one of two such potential scenarios: a “Heaven” scenario, resulting in, for example, the eradication of diseases and wealth inequality, where “predictions that recently seemed like science fiction are regularly exceeded”, or conversely, at the polar opposite end of the spectrum, a “Hell” scenario, in which “almost unimaginably bad things are happening” as the spread of the technology responsible for such atrocities continues to reach the point of no return, leaving humanity to ultimately be rendered helpless and on the verge of extinction. Further, Garreau envisions the potential for humanity to diverge in 3 distinct categories: The Enhanced, who embrace the adoption of GRIN technologies for self-enhancement purposes; The Naturals, who despite having access to such technology, elect to eschew such enhancement, perhaps for moral or aesthetic purposes, in favor of retaining their natural biological “equipment”; and The Rest, who lack access to GRIN technology and consequently remain constrained to the limits of natural human biology.

== See also ==
- Transhuman
- Transhumanism
- Life extension
