= James M. Rubenstein =

American geographer

James M. Rubenstein (born 1949) is an American geographer and professor of geography at Miami University in Oxford, Ohio, known for his work on human geography and specifically on the US automotive industry.

Rubenstein obtained his B.A. in public affairs from the University of Chicago in 1970, and went to London where he obtained his MSc in city and regional planning from the London School of Economics in 1971. Back in the States he obtained his PhD in geography and human engineering from the Johns Hopkins University in 1975. Rubenstein is appointed professor of geography at Miami University. He also works as consultant in the research department at the Federal Reserve Bank of Chicago.

== Selected publications ==
- Rubenstein, James M. Making and selling cars: Innovation and change in the US automotive industry. JHU Press, 2001.
- Rubenstein, James M. Changing US Auto Industry. Routledge, 2002.
- Rubenstein, James M., and Jerome Donald Fellmann. The Cultural Landscape: An Introduction to Human Geography. (2004).
- Klier, Thomas H., and James M. Rubenstein. Who really made your car?: restructuring and geographic change in the auto industry. WE Upjohn Institute, 2008.
