= Ecotopia =

1975 novel by Ernest Callenbach

Ecotopia: The Notebooks and Reports of William Weston
- Cover of the first edition
- Author: Ernest Callenbach
- Language: English
- Genre: Utopian novel
- Publisher: Ernest Callenbach (self-published as Banyan Tree Books); Bantam Books (1977); 30th-Anniversary edition, Heyday Books (2005)
- Publication date: 1975
- Publication place: United States
- Media type: Print (hardback & paperback)
- Pages: 181
- ISBN: 0-553-34847-7
- OCLC: 20169799
- Dewey Decimal: 813.54 20
- LC Class: PS3553.A424 E35 1990
- Followed by: Ecotopia Emerging

Ecotopia: The Notebooks and Reports of William Weston is a utopian novel by Ernest Callenbach, published in 1975. The society described in the book is one of the first ecological utopias and was influential on the counterculture and the green movement in the 1970s and thereafter. The author himself claimed that the society he depicted in the book is not a true utopia (in the sense of a perfect society), but, while guided by societal intentions and values, was imperfect and in-process.

Callenbach said of the story, in relation to Americans: "It is so hard to imagine anything fundamentally different from what we have now. But without these alternate visions, we get stuck on dead center. And we’d better get ready. We need to know where we’d like to go."

== Context ==
Callenbach wove his story using the fiber of technologies, lifestyles, folkways, and attitudes that were common in Northern California and the Pacific Northwest. The "leading edges" (his main ideas for Ecotopian values and practices) were patterns in actual social experimentation taking place in the American West. To draw an example, Callenbach's fictional Crick School was based on Pinel School, an alternative school located outside Martinez, California, and attended for a time by his son.

Callenbach placed the genesis of Ecotopia with an article he researched and wrote titled "The Scandal of Our Sewage". Besides the important social dimensions of the story, he talked publicly about being influenced, during work on the novel, by many streams of thought: scientific discoveries in ecology and conservation biology; the urban-ecology movement, concerned with a new approach to urban planning; and the soft-energy movement, championed by Amory Lovins and others. Much of the environmentally benign energy, home building and transportation technology described by the author was based on his reading of research findings published in such journals as Scientific American and Science.

Callenbach's concept does not reject high technology (or any technology) as long as it does not interfere with the Ecotopian social order and serves the overall objectives. Members of his fictional society prefer to demonstrate a conscious selectivity toward technology, so that not only human health and sanity might be preserved, but also social and ecological wellbeing. For example, Callenbach's story anticipated the development and liberal usage of videoconferencing.

During the 1970s when Ecotopia was written and published, many prominent counterculture and New Left thinkers decried the consumption and overabundance that they perceived as characteristic of post-World War II America. The citizens of Ecotopia share a common aim: a balance between themselves and nature. They were "literally sick of bad air, chemicalized food, and lunatic advertising. They turned to politics because it was finally the only route to self-preservation." In the mid-20th century as "firms grew in size and complexity citizens needed to know the market would still serve the interests of those for whom it claimed to exist". Callenbach's Ecotopia targets the fact that many people did not feel that the market or the government were serving them in the way they wanted them to. This book could be interpreted as "a protest against consumerism and materialism, among other aspects of American life."

The term "ecotopian fiction", as a subgenre of science fiction and utopian fiction, makes implicit reference to this book.

== Plot summary ==
The book is set in 1999 (25 years in the future from 1974) and consists of diary entries and reports of journalist William Weston, who is the first American mainstream media reporter to investigate Ecotopia, a small country that broke away from the United States in 1980 following an economic collapse. Prior to Weston's reporting, most Americans had been barred from entering the new country, which is depicted as being on continual guard against revanchism. The new nation of Ecotopia consists of Northern California, Oregon, and Washington; it is hinted that Southern California is a lost cause, and was most likely destroyed. The novel takes its form as a narrative from Weston's diary in combination with dispatches that he transmits to his publication, the fictional Times-Post.

At the beginning, Weston is skeptically curious about, not yet sympathetic to the Ecotopians. He describes details of the Ecotopian transportation system and the preferred lifestyle. This includes a wide range of gender roles, sexual freedom, and acceptance of non-monogamous relationships. Liberal cannabis use is evident. Televised passive, mass-media, spectator sports have been displaced in favor of local arts coverage, local participatory sports, and general fitness. A large fraction of young male Ecotopians participate voluntarily in a decidedly male ritual of mock warfare using wooden spears but no guns or arrows. The games are not re-enactments. Physical injuries, occasionally serious, are considered part of the game. Ecotopians on the whole value the benefits to young males over the accidental injuries. Ecotopia also tolerates the voluntary separatism of many people of African descent who have, in fact, chosen to live in a mini-nation in the San Francisco East Bay area in order to protect themselves from racism.

Ecotopian society has favored decentralized and renewable energy production and green building construction. The citizens are technologically creative, while remaining involved with and sensitive to nature. Thorough-going education reform is described, along with a highly localized system of universal medical care. (The narrator discovers that Ecotopian healing practices may include sexual stimulation.) The national defense strategy has focused on developing a highly advanced arms industry, while also allegedly maintaining hidden WMD within major US population centers to discourage conquest and annexation.

Through Weston's diary we learn of observations he does not include in his columns, such as his personally transformative love affair with an Ecotopian woman. The book's parallel narrative structures allow the reader to see how Weston's internal reflections, as recorded in his diary, are diffracted in his external pronouncements to his readers. Despite Weston's initial reservations, throughout the novel Ecotopian citizens are characterized as clever, technologically resourceful, emotionally expressive, and even occasionally violent – but also socially responsible, patriotic. They often live in extended families, and tend to live by choice in ethnically separated localities. Their economic enterprises are generally employee-owned and -controlled. The current governmental administration is that of a woman-led (but not exclusively female) party, and government structures are highly decentralized.

The novel concludes with Weston's finding himself enchanted by Ecotopian life and deciding to stay in Ecotopia as its interpreter to the wider world.

== Values exemplified in the novel ==
The values embodied by those Ecotopians depicted in the novel reflect the values espoused by its author. Callenbach said that his Ecotopians attach fundamental importance to environmental and social stability within which variety can flourish. They value creativity. They ensure equality for women. They implement the protection and restoration of natural systems. They promote food production in their cities.

As well, they treasure personal quality-of-life values, such as health and friendliness, and both meaningful discussion and play.

Callenbach began writing the novel by depicting the recycling of valuable materials and substances by the society; he saw a much-expanded role for recycling of all sorts, and this is key to many concepts underpinning Ecotopia.

== Anticipation of emerging realities ==
Worth mentioning is Callenbach's speculation on the roles of TV in his envisioned society. The author espoused the fly on the wall genre of direct political-process broadcasts, deeming them valuable to the citizenry. In some ways anticipating C-SPAN, which would first be broadcast in 1979, Ecotopia mentions that the daily life of the legislature and some of that of the judicial courts is televised in Ecotopia. Even highly technical debates are televised, addressing the needs and desires of Ecotopian viewers.

Another detail in the story is "print on demand" (POD) publishing. Ecotopian customers could choose selected print media from a jukebox-like device that would then print and bind the book. In the 21st century, POD services that print, bind and ship books for customers who order on-line have become commonplace.

== Impact ==
In 1981, Callenbach published Ecotopia Emerging, a multi-strand "prequel" suggesting how the sustainable nation of Ecotopia could have come into existence.

In 1990, Audio Renaissance released a partial dramatization of Ecotopia on audiocassettes in the form of recordings of a radio network broadcast (the Allied News Network replacing the Times-Post). The tape-recorded diaries of William Weston were read by the book's author, Ernest Callenbach. Weston's reports were read by veteran news reporter Edwin Newman.

In the online Earth Island Journal, Ecotopia was reviewed by Brian Smith, identifying himself as a child not of the 1960s but the 1980s. He read the novel 30 years after it was first published, and said of it: "I felt great affinity for the details of the world Callenbach predicted. Even better, I was impressed by how many of his ideas came to pass." influenced the identity of the West Coast in an interesting way and influenced the rise of bioregionalism and started the desire for West Coast unity in the form of Cascadia.

Ecotopia is now required reading in a number of colleges.

== Reception ==
Don Milligan in the British magazine Peace News gave Ecotopia a negative review, stating "Ecotopia is a shoddy amalgam of Swedish social democracy, Swiss neutrality, and Yugoslav workers' co-ops cobbled together with the authoritarianism of A Blueprint for Survival...Ecotopia is a flawed vision of a flawed future."

In marked contrast, Ralph Nader praised the book, noting that "None of the happy conditions in Ecotopia are beyond the technical or resource reach of our society."

According to Scott Timberg, quoting University of Nevada environmental-literature professor Scott Slovic in The New York Times, "'Ecotopia' [the concept] became almost immediately absorbed into the popular culture. You hear people talking about the idea of Ecotopia, or about the Northwest as Ecotopia."

In bolo'bolo, P.M. criticizes Callenbach by saying:

Dollars keep circulating in his Ecotopia just as they did before. It is nonsense to propose a system of direct, personal and ecological exchange and to permit at the same time the vehicle of anonymous, indirect, centralized circulation (money). Money as a general means of measurement presupposes mass-production (only in this case are goods measurable and comparable), a centralized bank system, mass distribution, etc. It is exactly this basic anonymity and non-responsibility of everyone for everything that causes and permits all those mechanisms of destruction of nature and people. As Callenbach poses these mechanisms as a moral problem (respect for nature, etc.), he needs a (very sympathetic, very democratic, even feminized) central State (The Big Sister) to repair the damage done by the system, through price controls, regulations, laws and prisons (of course, these latter only "training camps"). What he allows economically he has to forbid politically: the space for morality is opened. (Thou shalt not....)

== See also ==
- Cascadia (independence movement)
- Eco-socialism
- Green Imperialism: Colonial Expansion, Tropical Island Edens, and the Origins of Environmentalism—Richard Grove's exploring the roots of environmentalism
- Island—Aldous Huxley's novel exploring similar utopian concepts
- Nine Nations of North America—Joel Garreau's book about a North American cultural division into nine nations, one of them being Ecotopia
