= Left Coast =

American pejorative political expression

Map of the US House of Representatives as of the 119th Congress (2025–2027). Every district on the West Coast touching the Pacific Ocean, including Hawaii but excluding Alaska's at-large congressional district, is represented by Democrats as shown in blue.

Map of the Canadian House of Commons as of the 44th Parliament (2021–2025). Every district on the British Columbia Coast touching the Pacific Ocean is represented by either Liberals as shown in red, NDP as shown in orange or Greens as shown in green.

Left Coast is a political expression that implies that the West Coast of the United States leans politically to the left. The implication is that with the exception of Alaska, the states of California, Oregon, Washington, and Hawaii tend to vote for the Democratic Party, particularly in Coastal California, the Eugene and Portland metropolitan areas in Oregon, the Puget Sound region in Washington, and most of Hawaii. It also suggests that most people who live in the West Coast region have a generally more liberal or progressive attitude than the rest of the country. The phrase plays on the fact that the West Coast is on the left of the United States when viewing a map with north oriented at the top. The term also applies to British Columbia's place in Canada, for the same reasons.

In the United States, the expression is used pejoratively by right-leaning people, but proudly by people on the left. Conservative NewsMax columnist James Hirsen writes the "Left Coast Report", which puts down Hollywood celebrities and their scandals as well as providing conservative political commentary. He has also written a book, Tales from the Left Coast: True Stories of Hollywood Stars and Their Outrageous Politics. On the other side, the term is used by cartoonist Ted Rall as the name of his left-leaning political comic strip. Writer, voiceover actor, and gay rights activist Ben Patrick Johnson calls his video blog Life on the Left Coast. Fundraiser and CEO of San Francisco-based nonprofit Tides, Drummond Pike, maintains a CEO blog entitled Notes from the Left Coast.

== Definitions ==
The term is also used in a neutral or non-political sense. The left coast has by far the most workers in STEM professions and will continue to be a leading tech hub for the United States. The gross product of the left coast was approximately $1.2 trillion.

In Canada, the coastal strip of British Columbia, including Vancouver Island, is also referred to as the Left Coast. The use of the term "left coast" is not usually pejorative. For example, at the investiture to the Order of British Columbia of the painter Edward John Hughes by the Lieutenant Governor of British Columbia, Iona Campagnolo, in April 2006, she stated, "We have all occasionally heard of our beloved coast dismissed as the 'wet coast', the 'left' coast, even the 'rain coast', yet for most of us, these are 'terms of endearment'..."

== History ==
Although "left coast" has been used apolitically since the 1970s, San Francisco State professor Richard DeLeon used the term in his book Left Coast City to describe the progressive politics of San Francisco against the broader conservative backdrop of California during the Reagan era. Since 1992, the state of California has consistently voted Democratic in presidential elections. In the case of Oregon and Washington, and Hawaii, all three have voted Democratic since the 1988 presidential election.

Virtually no Republicans have statewide office in those states. Oregon and Washington are notable for being especially consistent in electing Democratic governors, and Oregon in particular has the country's longest streak of Democratic governors. Additionally, in the 2022 House of Representatives elections, all congressional districts directly bordering the Pacific Ocean (including Alaska and Hawaii) were won by Democrats.

During the 2024 United States presidential election, the states of California, Oregon, Washington, and Hawaii were won by Democratic candidate Kamala Harris. In 2024, the House of Representatives elections, Democrats maintained control of all Pacific bordering congressional districts across these states, reinforcing the Left Coast's Democratic dominance in federal representation.

Similarly in Canada, the coastal parts of British Columbia votes consistently for left leaning Members of Parliament such as Liberals and New Democrats, and for New Democrats as well as Greens provincially, though with some exceptions. For example, in the 2025 Canadian federal election, the Conservative Party of Canada won several coastal seats, including Nanaimo—Ladysmith and North Island—Powell River.

== See also ==
- Blue States
- Cascadia (independence movement)
- Flyover country
- Jesusland map
- History of the west coast of North America
- Progressivism in the United States
- San Francisco values
- Solid South
