= Joel Garreau =

American journalist, scholar, and author (born 1948)

Joel Garreau (born 1948) is an American journalist, scholar, and author.

In 1981, Garreau published The Nine Nations of North America. In 1991, he published Edge City: Life on the New Frontier. In 2005, he published Radical Evolution: The Promise and Peril of Enhancing Our Minds, Our Bodies—and What It Means to Be Human. He has served as a fellow at Cambridge University, a Bernard L. Schwartz Fellow at New America Foundation, the University of California at Berkeley and George Mason University. Previously, he was a reporter and editor at The Washington Post. He is a senior fellow at the School of Public Policy at George Mason University, leading two groups, one studying the future of universities and the other examining which global gateway city regions will be the winners and losers in the year 2020.

== See also ==
- Edge city
- Maes–Garreau law
- Transhumanism
- Urban planning
