= West Coast of the United States =

- Region
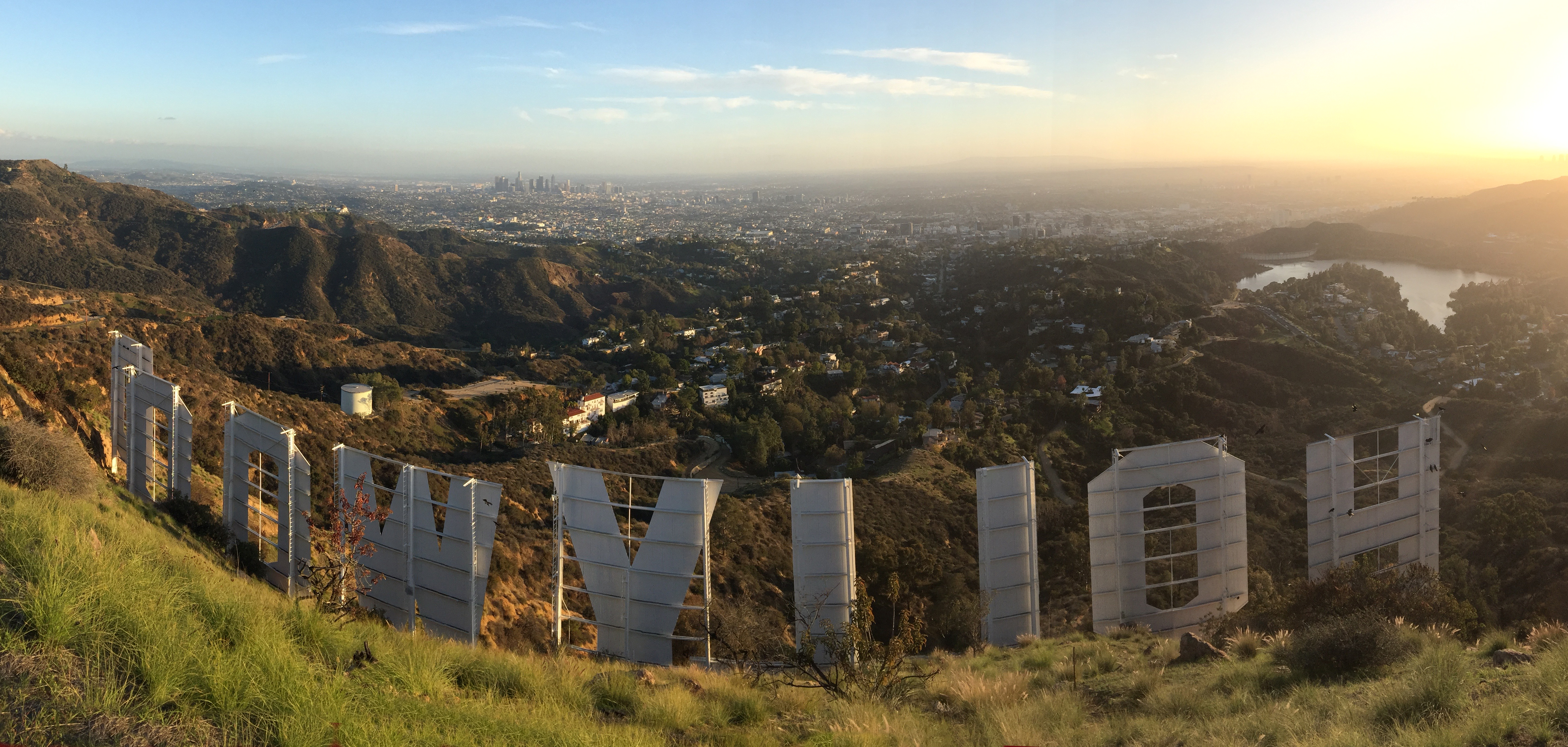
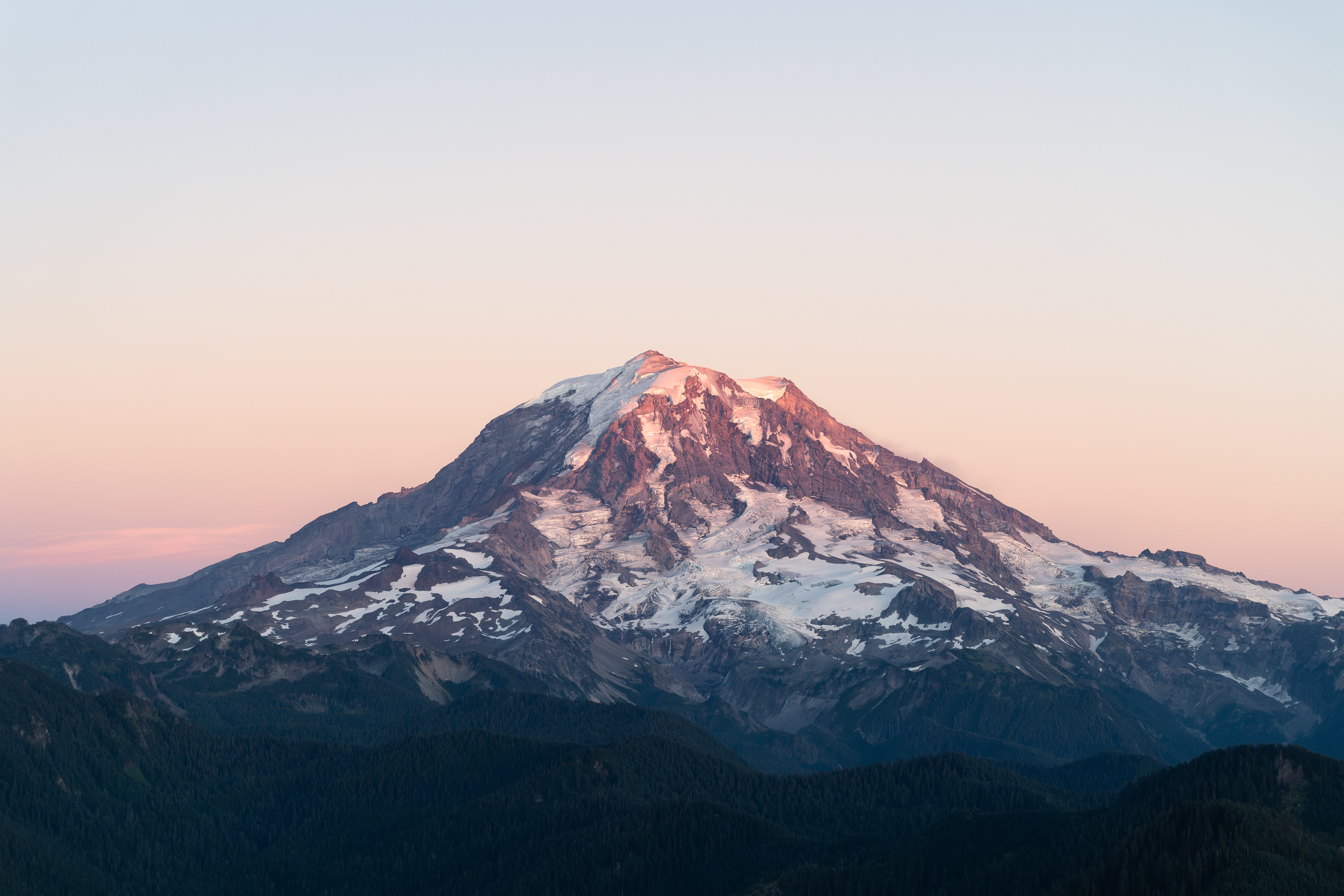
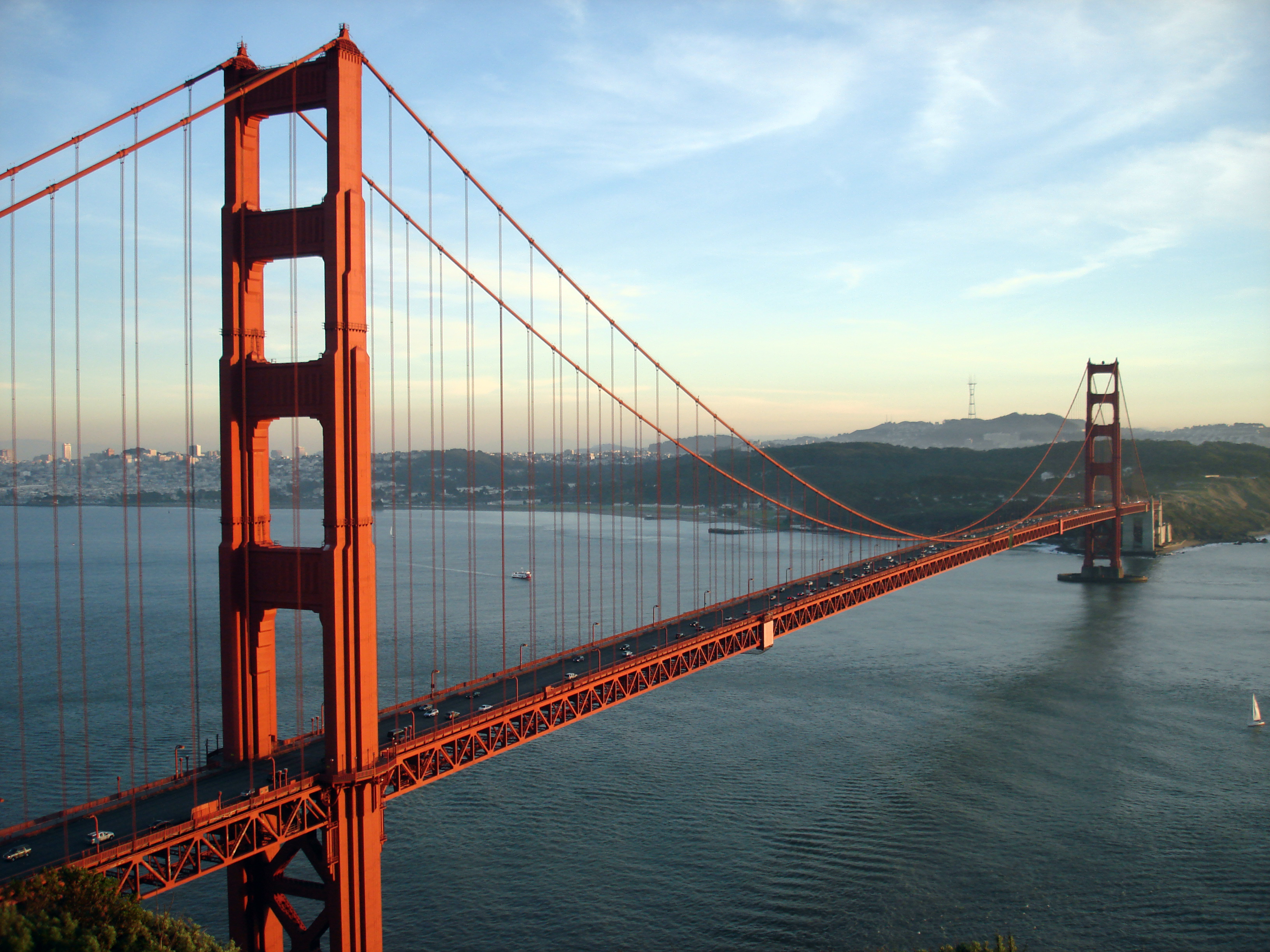
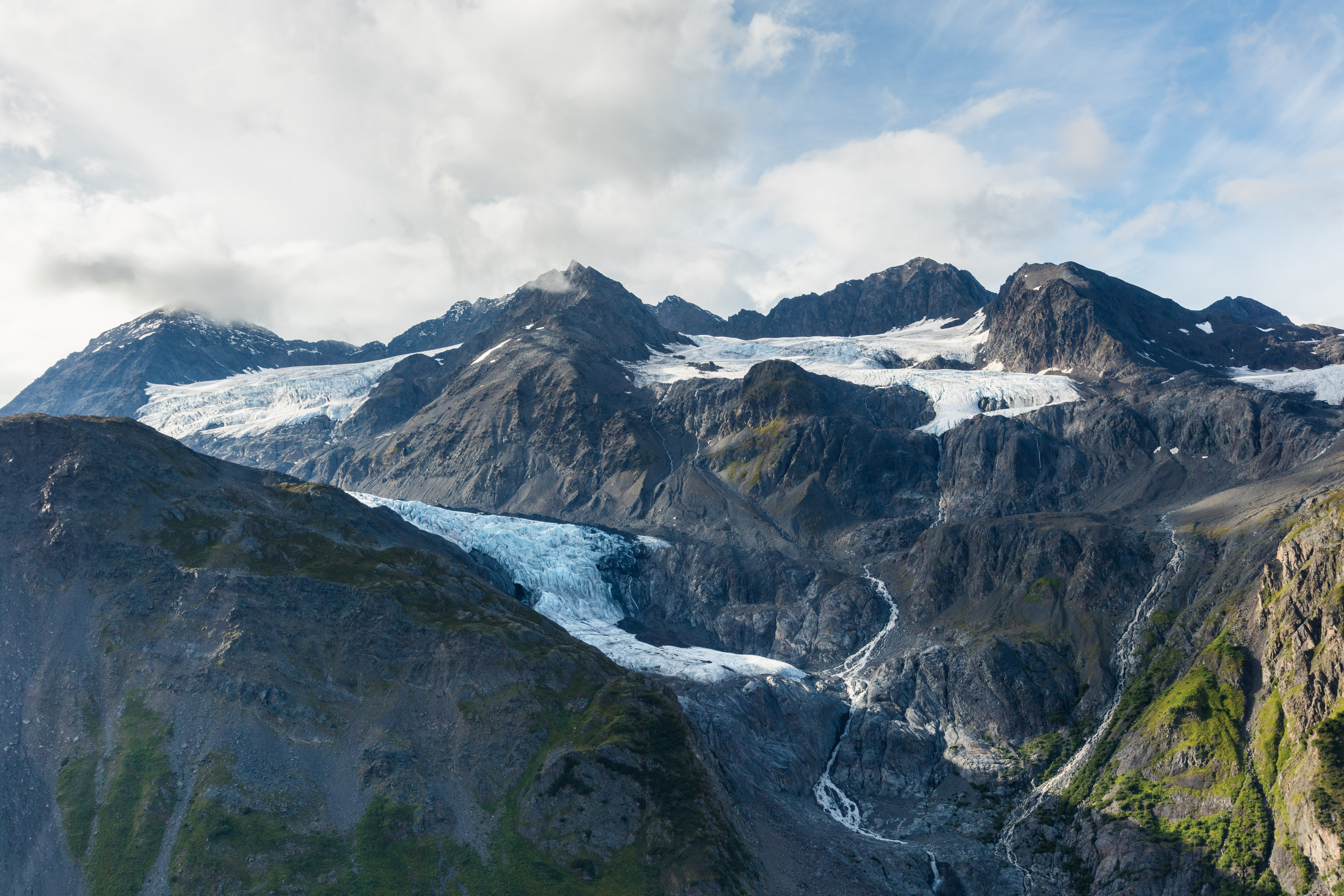
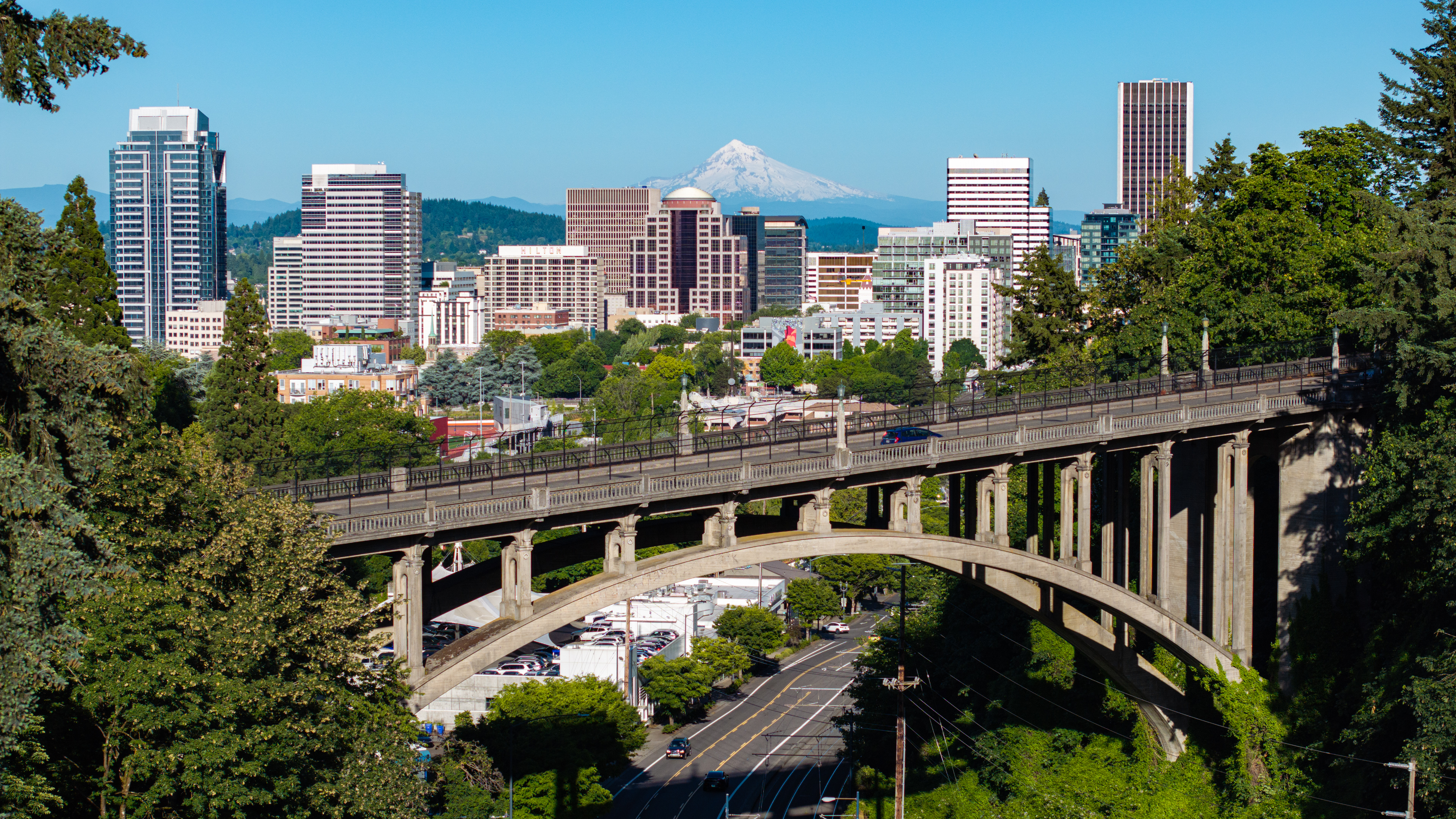
- Los Angeles (background) from the Hollywood Sign (foreground) Volcanic activity at Hawai'i Volcanoes Mount Rainier Seattle Golden Gate Bridge Chugach State Park Portland

- Location of the West Coast (red) in the United States (tan) as defined by the Census Bureau
- Country: United States
- Principal cities: Los Angeles; San Diego; San Jose; San Francisco; Sacramento; Fresno; Long Beach; Oakland; Portland; Salem; Eugene; Gresham; Hillsboro; Seattle; Spokane; Tacoma; Vancouver; Bellevue; Anchorage; Fairbanks; Juneau; Wasilla; Sitka; Honolulu; Pearl City; Hilo; Waipahu; Kailua
- Largest city: Los Angeles
- Largest metropolitan area: Greater Los Angeles

Area
  - Total: 1,009,688 sq mi (2,615,080 km^{2})
  - Land: 895,287 sq mi (2,318,780 km^{2})
  - Water: 21,433 sq mi (55,510 km^{2})
  - Coastal: 28,913 sq mi (74,880 km^{2})
- Highest elevation (Denali): 20,310 ft (6,190.5 m)
- Lowest elevation (Badwater Basin): −282 ft (−86 m)

Population (2020 census)
  - Total: 53,669,422 (Note: The population totals consist of the combined population of Alaska, California, Hawaii, Oregon, and Washington, according to the 2020 United States census and 2024 Census Bureau estimates.)
  - Estimate (2024): 53,848,093
  - Density: 59.9466/sq mi (23.1455/km^{2})

Time zone
- Mountain: UTC−7:00
  - Summer (DST): UTC−6:00
- Pacific: UTC−8:00
  - Summer (DST): UTC−7:00
- Alaska: UTC−9:00
  - Summer (DST): UTC−8:00
- Hawaii: UTC−10:00

The West Coast of the United States, also known as the Pacific Coast and the Western Seaboard, is the coastline along which the Western United States meets the North Pacific Ocean. The term typically refers to the contiguous U.S. states of California, Oregon, and Washington, but it occasionally includes Alaska and Hawaii in bureaucratic usage. For example, the U.S. Census Bureau considers both states to be part of a larger U.S. geographic division.

== Definition ==
There are conflicting definitions of which states comprise the West Coast of the United States, but the West Coast always includes California, Oregon, and Washington as part of that definition. Under most circumstances, however, the term encompasses the three contiguous states and Alaska, as they are all located in North America. For census purposes, Hawaii is part of the West Coast, along with the other four states. Encyclopædia Britannica refers to the North American region as part of the Pacific Coast, including Alaska and British Columbia. Although the encyclopedia acknowledges the inclusion of Hawaii in some capacity as part of the region, the editors wrote that "it has little in common geologically with the mainland states."

Several dictionaries offer different definitions of the West Coast. Lexico restricts the West Coast's definition to "the western seaboard of the U.S. from Washington to California." However, Macmillan Dictionary provides a less specific definition as "the western coast of the U.S., along the Pacific Ocean." As for the Cambridge Dictionary, the West Coast is "the area of the Pacific coast in the U.S. that includes California."

== History ==
The history of the West Coast begins with the arrival of the earliest known humans of the Americas, Paleo-Indians, crossing the Bering Strait from Eurasia into North America over a land bridge, Beringia, that existed between 45,000 BCE and 12,000 BCE (47,000–14,000 years ago). Small isolated groups of hunter-gatherers migrated alongside herds of large herbivores far into Alaska. Between 16,500 BCE and 13,500 BCE (18,500–15,500 years ago), ice-free corridors developed along the Pacific coast and valleys of North America and possibly by sea.

Alaska Natives, Indigenous peoples of the Pacific Northwest Coast, and California indigenous peoples eventually descended from the Paleo-Indians. They developed various languages and established trade routes.

Later, Spanish, British, French, Russian, and American explorers and settlers began colonizing the area.

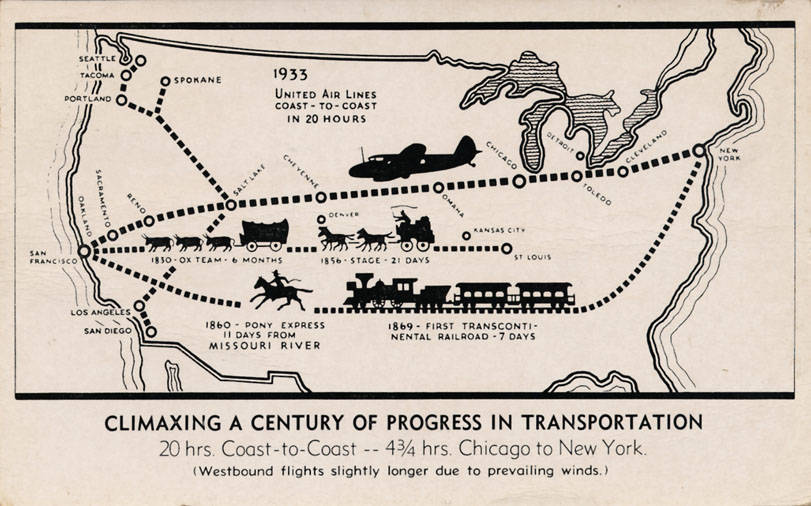
Progress in transportation across the US, 1930s

The West Coast was officially incorporated into the United States in 1848, through the establishment of the Oregon Territory; and in 1850, through the admission of California to the Union.

The Oregon Territory was previously jointly administered by the United States and the United Kingdom as part of the Oregon Country, and its boundary was established by the Oregon Treaty in 1846. In 1853, the Washington Territory was split from the Oregon Territory, and these territories were admitted as the West Coast states of Oregon, in 1859; and Washington, in 1889.

The area of the state of California, in turn, was ceded to the United States by Mexico in the Treaty of Guadalupe Hidalgo, in 1848, after the Mexican–American War. California was later admitted as the 31st state in 1850 as a free state.

On May 10, 1869, the first transcontinental railroad was completed joining the West Coast to the East of the United States.

== Climate ==
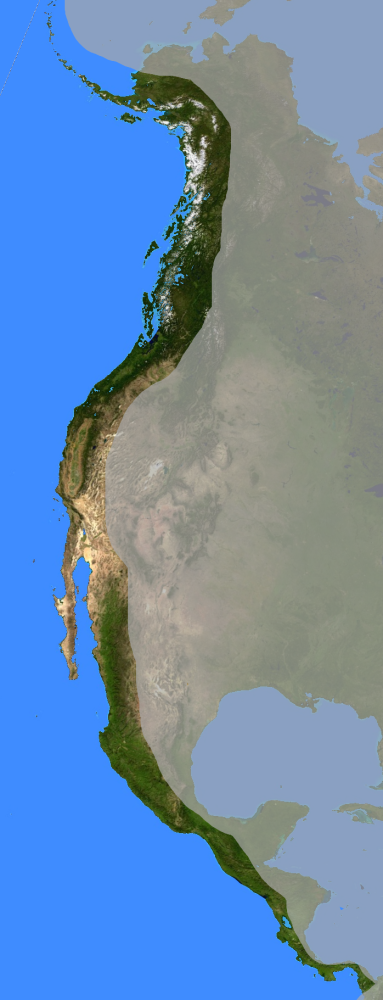
West coast of North America

The West Coast of the United States has an oceanic climate in its Northwestern, Northern, and Eastern edge towards the U.S.-Canada border, but from Northern California, towards the U.S.-Mexico border the climate is Mediterranean. While the northern half of the west coast, particularly coastal Washington and Oregon has moderate rainfall, particularly during the winter months, much of coastal California is drier year-round.

The coastline sees significantly milder temperatures compared to inland areas during summer. In far Northern California there is a difference of 17 °C (30 °F) between Eureka and Willow Creek despite only 25 miles (40 km) separating the locations and Willow Creek being located at a 500 metres (1,600 ft) elevation. Slightly narrower fluctuations can be seen all through the coastline, and could partially be explained by the cold currents in the Pacific Ocean moderating coastal temperatures and the mountain ranges blocking the maritime air from moving farther inland than its foothills during summer.

Coastal fog is also prevalent in keeping shoreline temperatures cool. While famous in the San Francisco Bay Area, coastal fog also affects Santa Monica in Los Angeles, Southern California, leading to May gray and June gloom conditions. Coastal California has very little yearly temperature differences with cool summers similar to those expected in parts of Northern Europe in San Francisco but warmer temperatures year-round further south. A short journey inland and summer temperatures are comparable with the rest of the United States on the same latitudes, sometimes warmer due to prevailing winds from the Nevada and Arizona hot desert climate.

== Government and politics ==
With the exception of Alaska, the Democratic Party has dominated West Coast politics in contemporary history, with the states consistently voting for Democrats in elections at various levels. Four out of five West Coast states have voted for Democrats in presidential elections since 1992, three of which have done so since 1988.

=== State governments ===
Governors of the West Coast
State	Governor	Party	Term	
State	Governor	Party	Start	End
Alaska	Mike Dunleavy	Republican	December 3, 2018	2026
California	Gavin Newsom	Democratic	January 7, 2019	2027
Hawaii	Josh Green	Democratic	December 5, 2022	2026
Oregon	Tina Kotek	Democratic	January 9, 2023	2027
Washington	Bob Ferguson	Democratic	January 15, 2025	2029

=== Ideology and party strength ===
In politics, the West Coast usually refers to the contiguous coastal states of California, Oregon, and Washington because of their similar political leanings. In 2017, The Oregonian columnist David Sarasohn described the West Coast as a "blue wall" of shared values on immigration, abortion, climate change, and civil liberties. By 2016, the West Coast states legalized marijuana after California voted to do so. According to a 2019 Pew Research Center poll, 72% of adults in Pacific states said that "climate change is affecting their local community at least some", higher than in any other region in the country.

Since 1992, the three states have voted for Democrats in presidential elections without interruption, but Oregon and Washington also voted for the Democratic presidential candidate in 1988.

For the 2022 elections, the Democratic Party controlled every single Western coastal seat in the United States House of Representatives.

In the 2010s, Democrats strengthened their political power along the West Coast. After winning a special election for a seat in the Washington state senate in 2017, Democrats built a government trifecta in all three West Coast states. For the 2022 U.S. House of Representatives elections, Democrats controlled all congressional districts touching the Pacific until 2024 when Alaska flipped Republican. Hawaii is not usually considered part of the West Coast in the political definition, though it is considered a Democratic stronghold. Before achieving statehood in 1959, Hawaii became a state favorable to Democrats to the point that they sought statehood for the territory. Southern Democrats opposed the move because it would mean additional votes against their region on several issues. Since achieving statehood, Hawaii consistently voted for Democrats in presidential elections, except in 1972 and 1984.

Unlike the other West Coast states, Alaska has been a reliable state for Republicans in presidential elections. Since achieving statehood, Alaska has voted for the Democratic presidential candidate only once in 1964. In 1960, the state narrowly voted for Republican Richard Nixon over Democrat John F. Kennedy and had voted for Republicans uninterrupted since 1968. All five West Coast states united in voting for Johnson in his 1964 landslide, while in 1972 and 1984, this occurred again as Nixon and Reagan got support from all 5.

=== Presidential election history ===
Parties
Democratic	Republican	Progressive

- **Bold** denotes election winner

Presidential electoral votes in the Pacific States since 1852
Year	Alaska	California	Hawaii	Oregon	Washington
1852	No election	**Pierce**	No election	No election	No election
1856	No election	**Buchanan**	No election	No election	No election
1860	No election	**Lincoln**	No election	**Lincoln**	No election
1864	No election	**Lincoln**	No election	**Lincoln**	No election
1868	No election	**Grant**	No election	Seymour	No election
1872	No election	**Grant**	No election	**Grant**	No election
1876	No election	**Hayes**	No election	**Hayes**	No election
1880	No election	Hancock	No election	**Garfield**	No election
1884	No election	Blaine	No election	Blaine	No election
1888	No election	**Harrison**	No election	**Harrison**	No election
1892	No election	**Cleveland**	No election	Harrison	Harrison
1896	No election	**McKinley**	No election	**McKinley**	Bryan
1900	No election	**McKinley**	No election	**McKinley**	**McKinley**
1904	No election	**Roosevelt**	No election	**Roosevelt**	**Roosevelt**
1908	No election	**Taft**	No election	**Taft**	**Taft**
1912	No election	Roosevelt	No election	**Wilson**	Roosevelt
1916	No election	**Wilson**	No election	Hughes	**Wilson**
1920	No election	**Harding**	No election	**Harding**	**Harding**
1924	No election	**Coolidge**	No election	**Coolidge**	**Coolidge**
1928	No election	**Hoover**	No election	**Hoover**	**Hoover**
1932	No election	**Roosevelt**	No election	**Roosevelt**	**Roosevelt**
1936	No election	**Roosevelt**	No election	**Roosevelt**	**Roosevelt**
1940	No election	**Roosevelt**	No election	**Roosevelt**	**Roosevelt**
1944	No election	**Roosevelt**	No election	**Roosevelt**	**Roosevelt**
1948	No election	**Truman**	No election	Dewey	**Truman**
1952	No election	**Eisenhower**	No election	**Eisenhower**	**Eisenhower**
1956	No election	**Eisenhower**	No election	**Eisenhower**	**Eisenhower**
1960	Nixon	Nixon	**Kennedy**	Nixon	Nixon
1964	**Johnson**	**Johnson**	**Johnson**	**Johnson**	**Johnson**
1968	**Nixon**	**Nixon**	Humphrey	**Nixon**	Humphrey
1972	**Nixon**	**Nixon**	**Nixon**	**Nixon**	**Nixon**
1976	Ford	Ford	**Carter**	Ford	Ford
1980	**Reagan**	**Reagan**	Carter	**Reagan**	**Reagan**
1984	**Reagan**	**Reagan**	**Reagan**	**Reagan**	**Reagan**
1988	**Bush**	**Bush**	Dukakis	Dukakis	Dukakis
1992	Bush	**Clinton**	**Clinton**	**Clinton**	**Clinton**
1996	Dole	**Clinton**	**Clinton**	**Clinton**	**Clinton**
2000	**Bush**	Gore	Gore	Gore	Gore
2004	**Bush**	Kerry	Kerry	Kerry	Kerry
2008	McCain	**Obama**	**Obama**	**Obama**	**Obama**
2012	Romney	**Obama**	**Obama**	**Obama**	**Obama**
2016	**Trump**	Clinton	Clinton	Clinton	Clinton
2020	Trump	**Biden**	**Biden**	**Biden**	**Biden**
2024	**Trump**	Harris	Harris	Harris	Harris
Year	Alaska	California	Hawaii	Oregon	Washington

== Demographics ==
Historical population
Census	Pop.	Note	%±
1900	2,634,285		—
1910	4,448,534		68.9%
1920	5,877,788		32.1%
1930	8,622,011		46.7%
1940	10,228,556		18.6%
1950	15,114,964		47.8%
1960	21,198,044		40.2%
1970	26,524,131		25.1%
1980	31,799,705		19.9%
1990	39,127,306		23.0%
2000	45,025,637		15.1%
2010	49,880,102		10.8%
2020	53,669,422		7.6%
2024 (est.)	53,848,093		0.3%
Source: 1910–2020

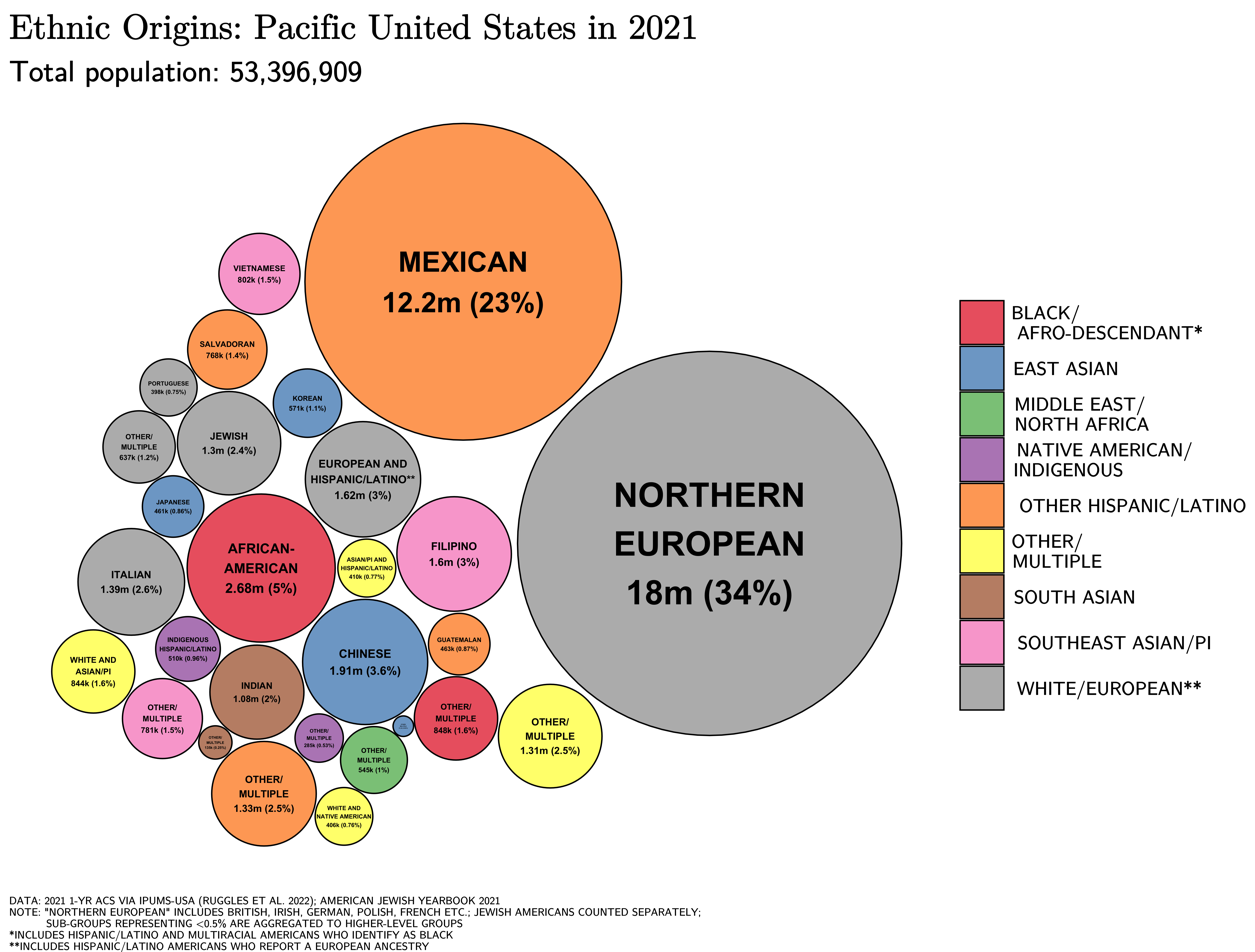
Ethnic origins in Pacific states

According to the results of the 2020 U.S. census, 16 of the 20 largest cities on the West Coast are in California. The cities of Los Angeles, San Diego, and San Jose are all among the ten most populous in the U.S. and each has more than a million residents. Los Angeles is nearly three times more populous than San Diego. Behind these three cities, San Francisco, Seattle and Portland are respectively fourth, fifth, and sixth in population for West Coast cities. Hawaii's capital and largest city, Honolulu, is the 13th largest city, and Alaska's largest city, Anchorage, is 17th on the West Coast.

Top 10 largest cities on the West CoastSource: U.S. Census Bureau; U.S. Department of Energy
City	Population (2020)
Los Angeles	3,898,747
San Diego	1,386,932
San Jose	1,013,240
San Francisco	873,965
Seattle	737,015
Portland	652,503
Fresno	542,107
Sacramento	524,943
Long Beach	466,742
Oakland	440,646

== Culture ==
California's history first as a major Spanish colony, and later as Mexican territory, has given the lower West Coast a distinctive Hispanic-American tone, which it also shares with the rest of the Southwest. Similarly, two of the three cities in which Asian Americans have concentrated, San Francisco and Los Angeles, are located on the West Coast, with significant populations in other West Coast cities. San Francisco's Chinatown, the oldest in North America, is a noted cultural center.

The West Coast also has a proportionally large share of green cities within the United States, which manifests itself in different cultural practices such as bicycling and organic gardening.

Greater Los Angeles, in particular, has immense global influence due to the presence of the Hollywood film industry, and is considered the creative capital of the world due to the proportion of its population involved in the entertainment industry. Meanwhile, parts of the San Francisco Bay Area are also known as Silicon Valley, due to the tremendous presence of software companies in the area, including tech giants like Apple, Meta, and Alphabet Inc.

In the Pacific Northwest, Portland and Seattle are both considered among the coffee capitals of the world. While Starbucks originated in Seattle, both cities are known for small-scale coffee roasters and independent coffeeshops. The culture has also been significantly shaped by the environment, especially by its forests, mountains, and rain. This may account for the fact that the Northwest has many high-quality libraries and bookshops (most notably Powell's Books and the Seattle Central Library) and a "bibliophile soul". The region also has a marginal, but growing independence movement based on bioregionalism and a Cascadian identity. The Cascadian flag has become a popular image at Seattle Sounders FC and Portland Timbers games. The Seattle metropolitan area is also well known for tech and video game companies, such as Microsoft in Redmond, Washington, Amazon in Seattle, and Nintendo of America in Redmond, Valve Corporation and Bungie, inc. in Bellevue, Washington.

Alaska is widely known for its outdoors and its inhabitants engage in a range of activities that are unique to the state. Some of these activities can be experienced through the state's annual events, such as the Iron Dog snowmobile race from Anchorage to Nome and on to Fairbanks. Other events include the World Ice Art Championships (Fairbanks) and the Sitka Whalefest (Sitka).

== Transportation ==
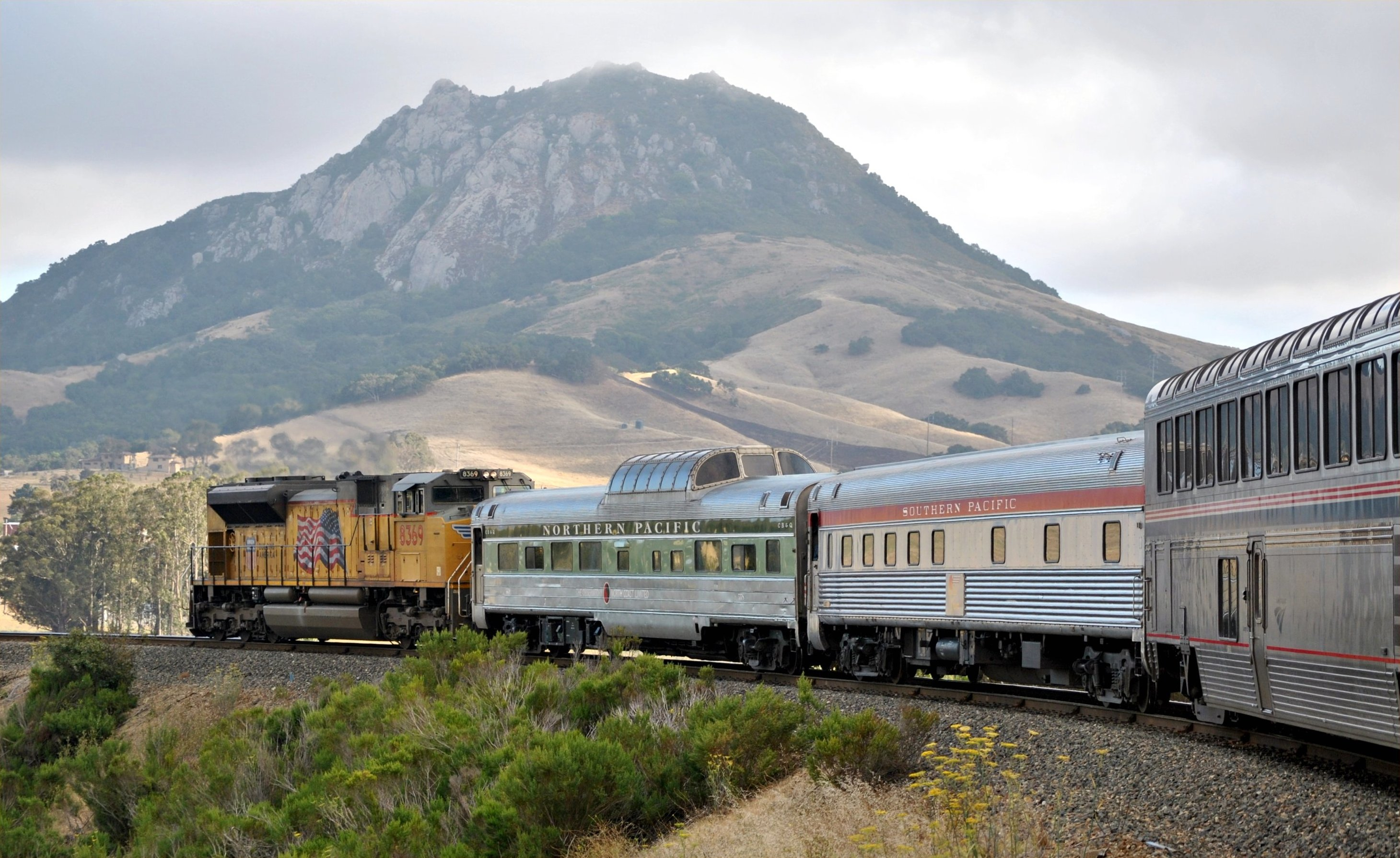
The Coast Starlight, an Amtrak passenger train that traverses most of the West Coast

The Coast Starlight is the main interstate passenger railroad route provided by Amtrak along the coast. BNSF Railway and the Union Pacific Railroad own and operate railroads that connect cities on the coast. Interstate travel is also served by roads such as Interstate 5, the main high-speed north-south freeway along the West Coast.

Interstate 5 follows the coast only as far north as Dana Point, California, before turning inland for much of its route. The main coastal scenic route throughout most of California is California State Route 1. From the end of SR 1 at Leggett, California, U.S. Route 101 serves as the main scenic route along the coast in far Northern California, Oregon, and Washington state. Sierra High Route is a popular trekking route.

Several of the most important international airports in the United States are located along the West Coast, including Seattle–Tacoma International Airport, San Francisco International Airport, and Los Angeles International Airport. Seattle, San Francisco, and Los Angeles all connect numerous destinations around the Pacific Ocean to points throughout North America, and are often described as gateways to the Pacific Rim.

The West Coast has several metropolitan areas that rank high among U.S. cities for their low impact on carbon emissions in transportation due to high adoption of electric vehicles, high use of mass transit, and low truck mileage. A 2024 analysis ranked San Jose, San Francisco, Los Angeles, Seattle, San Diego, and Portland among the top six metropolitan areas for low transportation emissions.

== See also ==
- British Columbia Coast
- East Coast of the United States
- East Coast–West Coast hip hop rivalry
- Gulf Coast of the United States
- Pacific Coast of Mexico
- Southern California Bight
- Sun Belt
- Third Coast
