= Cascadia movement =

Movement for greater autonomy in the Pacific Northwest

Cascadia
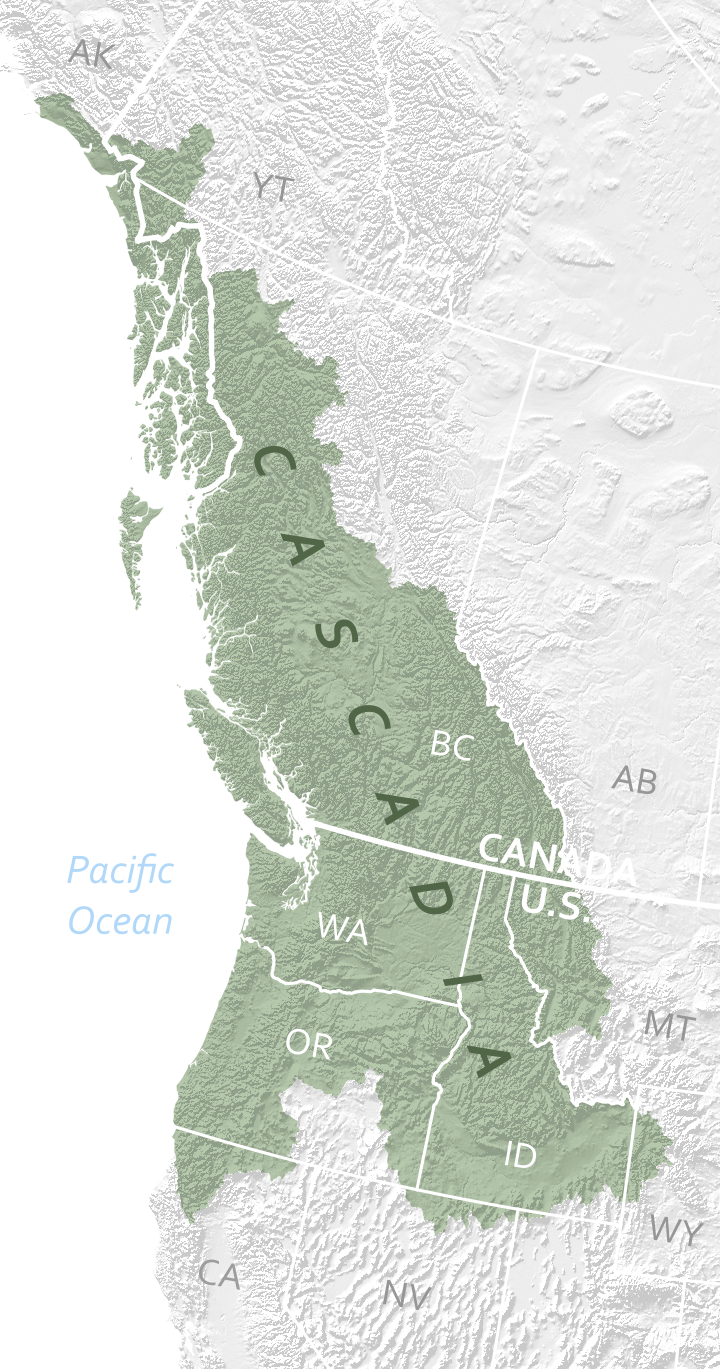
- Boundaries of the bioregion with respect to current political divisions (Washington, Oregon, Idaho, Montana, California, Alaska, Nevada, Wyoming, British Columbia, and Yukon)
- Largest city: Seattle
- Common languages: English
- Demonym: Cascadian

Area
  - Total: 1,594,420 km^{2} (615,610 sq mi)

Population
  - 2022 estimate: 19,250,000
  - 2024 census: 19,233,049
- GDP (PPP): 2018 estimate
  - Total: US$1.1 trillion estimate
  - Per capita: $69,153 estimate
- a. *Statistics are compiled from US and Canadian census records by combining information from the states of Washington, Idaho and Oregon as well as the province of British Columbia.

The Cascadia movement refers to various different movements seeking greater autonomy for various conceptualizations of land adjacent to what is broadly referred to as the Pacific Northwest. This includes a nationalist independence movement seeking to establish Cascadian autonomy along the modern state lines of Oregon, Washington and the Canadian province of British Columbia, as well as a Cascadian national identity surpassing identification with the state/territory or federal government. Proponents of this conceptualization of Cascadia also frequently advocate for the creation of a shared economic zone. There also exists a bioregionalist movement that aims to promote the recognition, decolonization and reinhabitation of the Cascadia bioregion, and the construction of bioregional mutual aid networks.

The movement is largely centered in the major cities of Portland, Seattle, and Vancouver, although the bioregionalist movement also includes Idaho and the Alaskan Panhandle, along with small parts of California, Montana, Nevada, Utah, Wyoming, and Yukon due to its broader bioregional scale. More conservative advocates for Cascadian federalism propose borders that include the land west of the crest of the Cascade Range, while some advocates propose borders as far north as Alaska and the Yukon region.

The main drivers of the movement include environmentalism, bioregionalism, privacy, civil liberties and freedom, increased regional integration, and local food networks and economies.

== Historical background ==
Before 1800, it is estimated that more than 500,000 people lived within the region in dozens of nations, such as the Tillamook, Chinook, Haida, Nootka, Nisga'a, and Tlingit. They lived and traded largely within the Cascadia Bioregion, using its extensive system of waterways for transport and pre-colonial trade. They spoke many different languages.

Indigenous sovereignty, the rights of nature, and decolonization remain a key point for many Cascadian and first nation organizers, who argue that indigenous self-determination cannot be gained legally under the framework of the United States constitution.

=== 19th century ===
==== Oregon Country and Columbia District ====
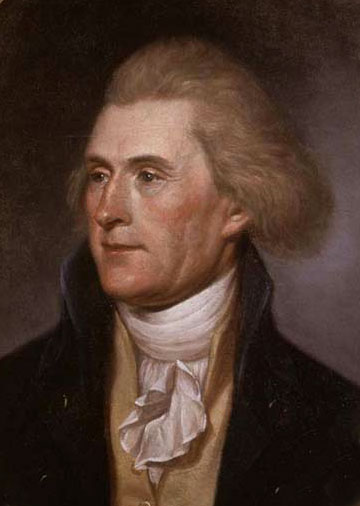
Thomas Jefferson said he viewed Fort Astoria "as the germ of a great, free, and independent empire on that side of our continent".

An 1813 letter from American statesman Thomas Jefferson to fur tycoon John Jacob Astor congratulated Astor on the establishment of Fort Astoria (the coastal fur trade post of Astor's Pacific Fur Company) and described Fort Astoria as "the germ of a great, free, and independent empire on that side of our continent, and that liberty and self-government spreading from that as well as from this side, will insure their complete establishment over the whole. It would be an afflicting thing, indeed, should the English be able to break up the settlement. Their bigotry to the bastard liberty of their own country, and habitual hostility to every degree of freedom in any other, will induce the attempt." The same year of Jefferson's letter, Fort Astoria was sold to the British North West Company, which was based in Montreal.

John Quincy Adams agreed with Jefferson's views about Fort Astoria, and labeled the entire Northwest as "the empire of Astoria", although he also saw the whole continent as "destined by Divine Providence to be peopled by one nation." As late as the 1820s James Monroe and Thomas Hart Benton thought the region west of the Rockies would be an independent nation.

Elements among the region's white American population starting in the 1840s sought to form their own country, despite their small number. Oregon pioneer John McLoughlin was employed as the Chief Factor (regional administrator) by the Hudson's Bay Company for the Columbia District, administered from Fort Vancouver. McLoughlin was a significant force in the early history of the Oregon Country, and argued for its independence. In 1842 McLoughlin (through his lawyer) advocated an independent nation that would be free of the United States during debates at the Oregon Lyceum. This view won support at first and a resolution was adopted. When the first settlers of the Willamette Valley held a series of politically foundational meetings in 1843, called the Wolf Meetings, a majority voted to establish an independent republic. Action was postponed by George Abernethy of the Methodist Mission to wait on forming an independent country.

In May 1843, the settlers in the Oregon Country created their first western-style government as a Provisional Government. Several months later the Organic Laws of Oregon were drawn up to create a legislature, an executive committee, a judicial system, and a system of subscriptions to defray expenses. Members of the ultra-American party insisted that the final lines of the Organic Act would be "until such time as the USA extend their jurisdiction over us" to try to end the Oregon Territorial independence movement. George Abernethy was elected its first and only Provisional Governor. From the mid-1850s to the early 1860s, the territory explored ideas of secession, with pro-slavery Democrat Benjamin Stark laying claim to the idea, supporting the formation of a "Pacific Union", along with California politician William Gwinn.

British claims north of the Columbia River were ceded to the United States by the contentious Oregon Treaty of 1846. In 1860, there were three different statements from separate influential individuals on the creation of a "Pacific Republic".

==== American Civil War ====
When most of the slave states of the US seceded to form the Confederate States of America, some Oregon Territory settlers reacted to the instability of the union as another opportunity to seek independence. The leader of California's federal forces at the outset of the Civil War was himself a supporter of the Confederate cause, but that movement proved weaker than its opposition. For his role in convincing Californians to remain in the Union, Thomas Starr King was honored as one of the two "heroes of California" in the U.S. Capitol's National Statuary Hall Collection until 2009, when his statue was replaced by one of Ronald Reagan.

While independence movements during this time failed to take root, Adella M. Parker, president of the University of Washington Alumni Association, argued in her 1894 speech at the groundbreaking of the Seattle campus that the Pacific Northwest should build a new regional culture:

That the West should un-falteringly follow the East in fashions and ideals would be as false and fatal as that America should obey the standards of Europe. Let the West, daring and unprejudiced, discover its own ideals and follow them. The American standard in literature and philosophy has long been fixed by the remote East. Something wild and free, something robust and full will come out of the West and be recognized in the final American type. Under the shadow of those great mountains a distinct personality shall arise, it shall adopt other fashions, create new ideals, and generations shall justify them.

== Secession ==
Cascadian federalists generally state that their political motivations deal mostly with political, economic, cultural, and ecological ties and the beliefs that the eastern federal governments are out of touch, slow to respond, and hinder provincial and state attempts at further bioregional integration. These connections go back to the Oregon Territory, and further back to the Oregon Country, the land most commonly associated with Cascadia, and the last time the region was treated as a single political unit, though administered by two countries. Some have asserted that political protest in the wake of the 2004 United States presidential election appears to be the primary reason for renewed separatist movements throughout states with substantial Democratic majorities, such as Washington and Oregon.

If an independent country, as measured only by the combination of present Washington, Oregon, Idaho and British Columbia statistics, Cascadia would be home to more than 19 million people, and would have an economy generating more than US$1.1 trillion worth of goods and services annually. This number would increase if portions of Northern California and Southern Alaska were also included. By land area, Cascadia would be the 18th largest country in the world, with a territory of 615,609 sq mi (1,594,420 km^{2}), placing it ahead of Mongolia and behind Libya. Its population would be similar in size to that of Ecuador, Somalia, Cambodia, or the Netherlands.

Cascadian independence has gained popularity after the 2016 US presidential election, which resulted in the first presidency of Donald Trump, leading to a proposed secession referendum in Oregon. The individuals who put forward the proposal had withdrawn their petition by April 2020. Since Trump's first election, several new organizations in Cascadia have emerged. Initially, a series of groups were established to discuss the possibility of a Cascadia secession movement, bringing together hundreds of people in person. These groups later adopted the name Vote Cascadia.

Members of the Cascadian independence movement have declared May 18 as "Cascadia Day", in recognition of the lateral 1980 eruption of Mount St. Helens, with the week surrounding that date being "Cascadia Culture Week".

The Cascadia Party of British Columbia formed in 2016 and nominated two candidates, though neither was elected, in the 2017 British Columbia general election to advocate for sovereignty for the Cascadia bioregion. It did not run any candidates in the 2020 British Columbia general election. The party ran no candidates in the 2024 British Columbia general election and was deregistered by Elections BC on November 12, 2024.

In May 2021, the Cascadia Bioregional Party was established, advocating the independence of the Cascadian Bioregion from the United States and Canada, and several social, environmental, and economic reforms. It has since been suspended.

== Bioregionalism ==
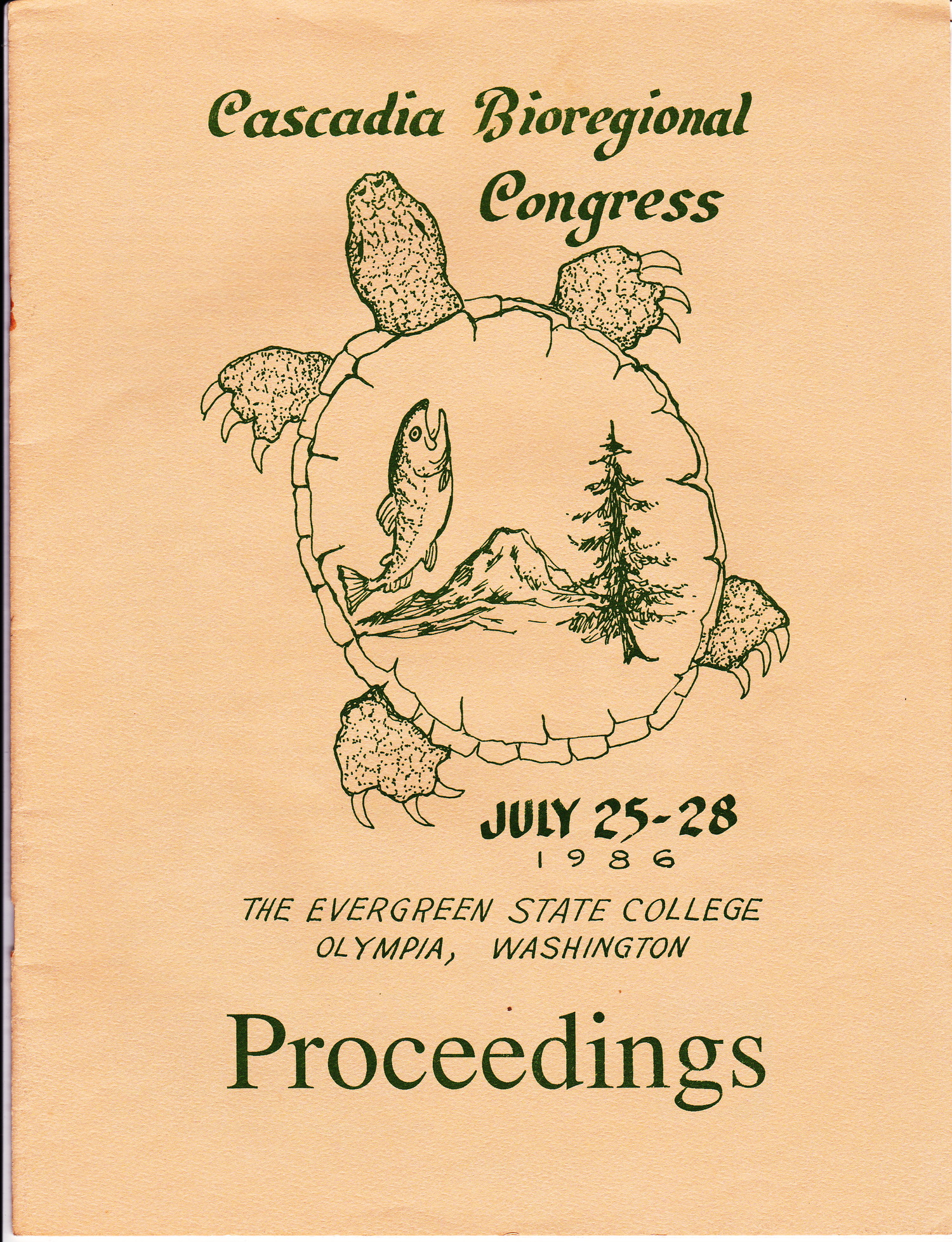
The cover of the proceedings from the first Cascadia Bioregional Congress, held July 25–28, 1986 at the Evergreen State College in Olympia, Washington

Cascadia is an idea rooted in bioregionalism. Cascadians believe that the Cascadia bioregion is a better representation of place, and the people and inhabitants living there, than the current United States or Canadian borders or state lines, which they feel arbitrarily divides the geography and communities living within it.

=== Bioregional congresses ===
The early Cascadia movement was formed through a series of Cascadia "Bioregional Congresses" held in the early 1980s. They were a regional extension of the North American Bioregional Congresses (NABC), and were designed to alternate in tandem with continental and regionally focused meetings about social needs and governance. The first Cascadia Bioregional Congress was held in 1986 at The Evergreen State College in Olympia, Washington, followed by the Ish River Bioregional Confluence in 1987, and a Pacific Cascadia Bioregional Congress held in 1988. Each of these gatherings brought together about a hundred people as "delegates" for their watersheds.

=== Cascadia bioregion ===
The Cascadia bioregion is defined by the watersheds of the Fraser, Snake and Columbia River, and encompasses all or portions of Washington, Oregon, Idaho, California, Nevada, Wyoming, Montana, Alaska, British Columbia, and Alberta. It stretches from Cape Mendocino in the south, to Mt. St. Alias in the North, and as far east as the Yellowstone Caldera.

The delineation of a bioregion is defined through watersheds and ecoregions, with the belief that political boundaries should match ecological and cultural boundaries, and that culture stems from place. Current Cascadian bioregionalists use this framework as an argument for independence, autonomy and what they feel better represents the communities and area as an alternative to capitalism and the nation state.

The Cascadia Department of Bioregion seeks to build a bioregionalist network as an alternative to the nation-state structure.

=== Cascadian bioregional flag ===
The Cascadian bioregional flag, also known as the Doug flag, or simply the Cascadia flag, is a commonly accepted symbol for the Cascadia movement. It was designed in 1994 by Portland native Alexander Baretich. It is intended to be a direct representation of the bioregion, with green for the forests, blue for the waters, and white for the snow-capped mountains, with a Douglas Fir tree to symbolize the resilience of the region. Writing about the flag's symbolism Baretich said:

The Cascadia flag conveys something more tangible than an abstract concept of demarcation of space. It is not a flag of blood nor of the glory of a nation, but a love of the bioregion; our ecological family, natural boundaries & the place in which we live & love.

Baretich has stated that Cascadia is not necessarily about secession but is rather about survival after the collapse of peak oil, global warming, and other pending environmental and socioeconomic problems.

== Economic efforts ==
The combined economies of Washington, Oregon, Idaho and British Columbia has a population of more than 19 million people and generates more than US$1.1 trillion worth of goods and services annually. Portland housed the companies of Nike, Adidas, Columbia Sportswear and Intel while Seattle houses Amazon, Starbucks, Expedia, Boeing, Costco, Alaska Airlines, Nordstrom and Microsoft, with Vancouver hosting many companies and a robust and subsidized movie-production industry. Despite claims of a shared culture between Portland, Seattle, and Vancouver, cross-collaboration between the cities is scant, with more interaction coast-to-coast than intraregionally according to LinkedIn data.

This is the given reasoning for the construction of an economic corridor. In 2019, the Cascadia Innovation Corridor proposed the construction of affordable housing, collaborative scientific research, and high-speed rail integrating the three cities by 2035, built on a vision of sustainability. It states that 1.4 million housing units could be built through the rezoning of small towns and rural communities and redeveloping properties.

In December 2024, the Washington State Department of Transportation was awarded $49.7 million by the Federal Railroad Administration to study high-speed rail connecting the region. The reasoning for the study is further regional integration allowing for "a stronger, better connected economic megaregion."

A supranational economic megaregion is seen as an alternate vision to Donald Trump's trade war, which alienated Canada from the US, and hurt the Cascadian economy.

Supporters of the corridor include Brad Smith, president of Microsoft, with an executive committee including Rachel Smith, president of Seattle Metropolitan Chamber of Commerce, Bridgitte Anderson, president of Greater Vancouver Board of Trade, and Andrew Hoan, president of the Portland Metro Chamber.

== Regional identity ==
The idea of Cascadia as an economic cross-border region has been embraced by a wide diversity of civic leaders and organizations. The "Main Street Cascadia" transportation corridor concept was formed by former mayor of Seattle Paul Schell during 1991 and 1992. Schell later defended his cross-border efforts during the 1999 American Planning Association convention, saying "that Cascadia represents better than states, countries and cities the cultural and geographical realities of the corridor from Eugene to Vancouver, B.C." Schell also formed the Cascadia Mayors Council, bringing together mayors from cities along the corridor from Whistler, British Columbia, to Medford, Oregon. The last meeting was held in May 2004. Other cross-border groups were set up in the 1990s, such as the Cascadia Economic Council and the Cascadia Corridor Commission.

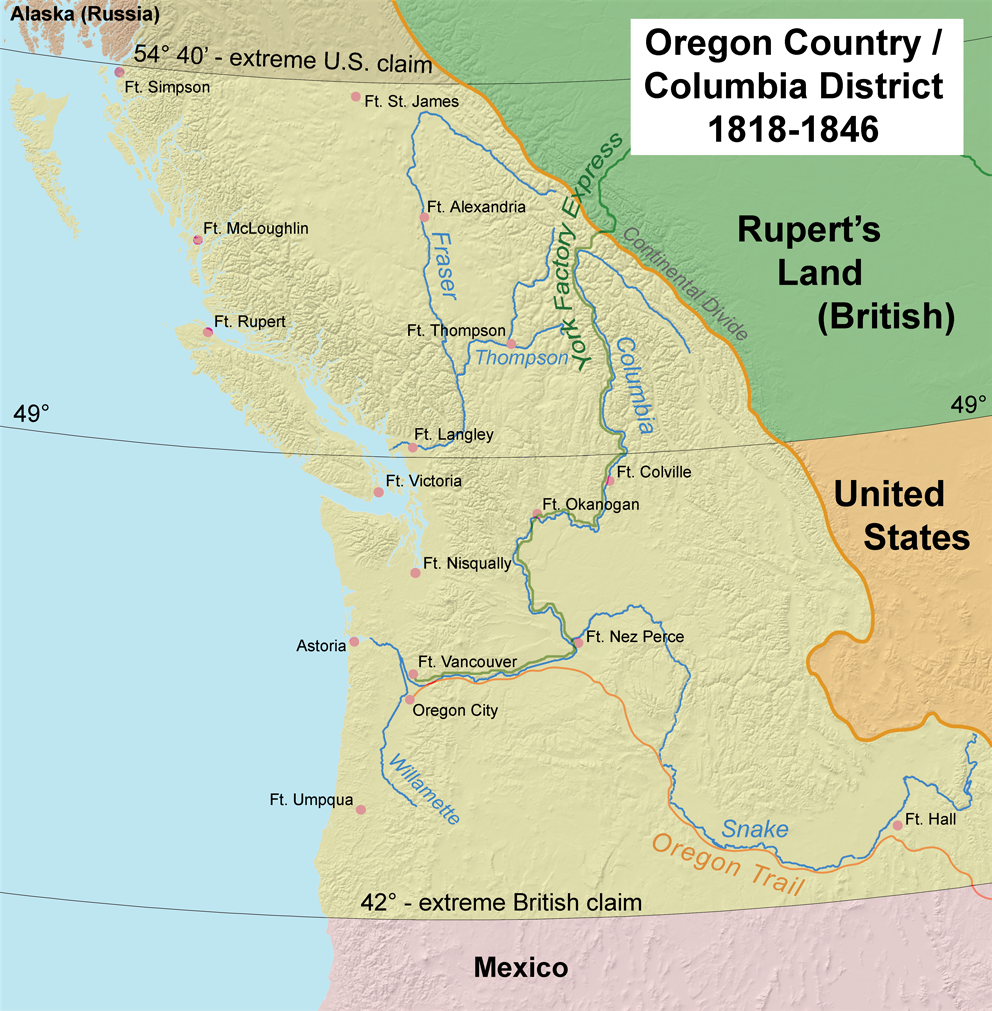
The Oregon Country as claimed by the United States. The Columbia District extended much farther north.

The region is served by several cooperative organizations and interstate or international agencies, especially since 2008 with the signing of the Pacific Coast Collaborative which places new emphasis on bio-regionally coordinated policies on the environmental, forestry and fishery management, emergency preparedness and critical infrastructure, regional high-speed rail and road transportation as well as tourism.

The area from Vancouver, B.C. down to Portland has been termed an emerging megaregion by the National Committee for America 2050, a coalition of regional planners, scholars, and policy-makers. This group defines a megaregion as an area where "boundaries [between metropolitan regions] begin to blur, creating a new scale of geography". These areas have interlocking economic systems, shared natural resources and ecosystems, and common transportation systems link these population centers together. This area contains 17 percent of Cascadian land mass, but more than 80 percent of the Cascadian population. Programs such as the enhanced driver's license program can be used to more easily cross the border between Washington and British Columbia.

=== Polling ===
==== Canada ====
In British Columbia, a 2020 poll conducted by Glacier Media and Research Co. found significant growth of support for Cascadia and British Columbia as a standalone, independent country. As a standalone country, support increased to 27 percent from 17 percent in 2018 and 2019. British Columbians aged 18 to 34 were more likely to feel that the province could be independent (37% support) than those aged 35 to 54 (28%) and those aged 55 and over (18%). As of 2020, British Columbians identify more with the Cascadia region than Canada seeing "more in common", and identification with Cascadia is particularly strong in younger generations — 66% age 18 to 34, 60% age 35 to 54, and 48% 55 and older.

A poll commissioned by the Western Standard magazine in 2005 asked whether "western Canadians should begin to explore the idea of forming their own country", and 35.6 percent of respondents from Western Canada agreed.

Angus Reid conducted a four-part study on Western Canadian identity and surveyed 4,024 Canadians in late December and early January 2017 and 2018. It showed that 54 percent of British Columbians felt they had the most in common with Washington state, and 18 percent picked California. In comparison, just 15 percent chose Alberta, 9 percent chose Ontario, and less than 3 percent chose Manitoba, Saskatchewan, or another Canadian area. This connection, while not new, has steadily continued to grow. (In 1991, half of BC respondents told the Angus Reid Group they had the most in common with Washington.) In 1991, there was a greater degree of mutual recognition between British Columbia, Alberta, and other parts of Canada.

In January 2025, Elizabeth May, a Canadian Member of Parliament for the Green Party of Canada, referenced the Cascadia movement and related academic research in response to U.S. President Donald Trump's remarks proposing the acquisition of Canada as the 51st state.

==== United States ====
While it is difficult to gauge support for Cascadia specifically in Washington and Oregon, because no research has been done for those states, support for secession is at one of its highest points in the history of the United States as of 2021. In 2021, a study was conducted by Brightline Watch of 2,750 Americans between June 16 and June 26 that asked, "Would you support or oppose (your state) seceding from the United States to join a new union (list of five regional unions)?" The poll found that support for regional secession was highest in the Pacific and Southern regions, with 66 percent of Republicans, 50 percent of independents in the South, and 47 percent of Democrats in the Pacific supporting secession. In this survey, Brightline used the regional union of Washington, Oregon, Alaska, Hawaii, and California as the Pacific regional union. Overall, support for secession was 37 percent in the US in general. In a 2022 poll, the University of Virginia Center for Politics found similar results, determining that 52 percent of Trump voters and 41 percent of Biden voters at least somewhat agreed that "it's time to split the country, favoring blue/red states seceding from the union".

This builds on earlier research conducted by Zogby International in 2018, which found that 39 percent of Americans support the idea of independence. Additionally, 68 percent of people expressed openness to a state's or region's right to peacefully secede from the United States, marking the highest rate since the American Civil War. This number included 41 percent of Democrats, with the largest demographic supporting the idea being Black Americans at 47 percent, replacing the previous current highest bloc (which had been Latinos 51% in 2017), and followed by Republicans at 39 percent.

However, none of these studies are specifically about forming an independent Cascadia. The movement saw much discussion in the 1990s, and while the increase in security and American nationalism after the September 11 attacks set back the movement's momentum for some time, the concept has continued to become more ingrained into society and the public consciousness. In January 2011, Time magazine included Cascadia number eight on a list of "Top 10 Aspiring Nations", noting it "has little chance of ever becoming a reality".

== In popular culture ==
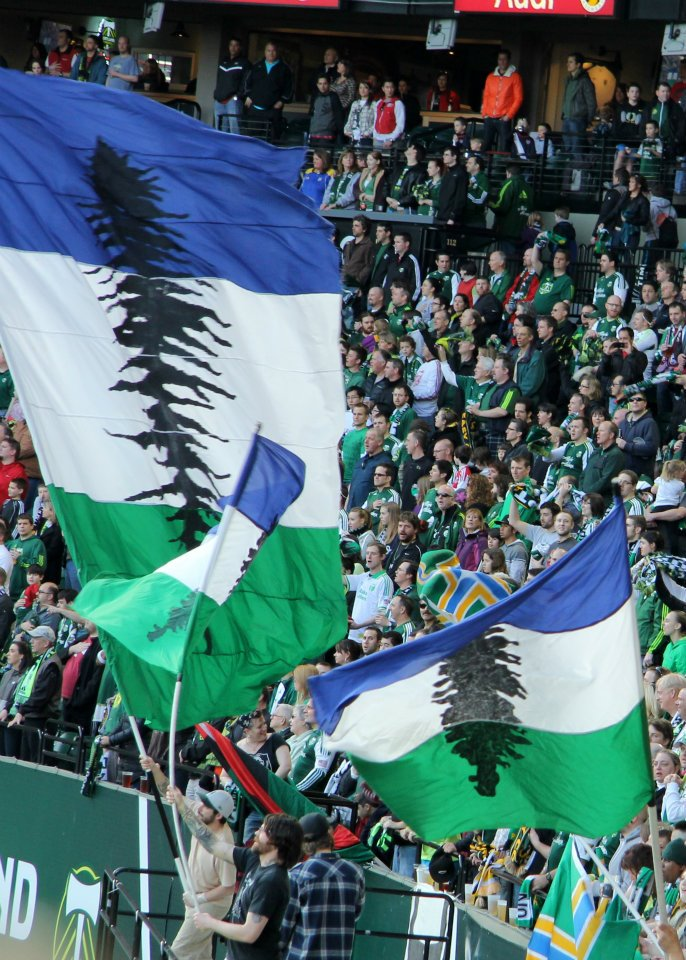
Timbers Army loyalists at a Portland Timbers game fly the Doug flag.

- The Doug flag showing a Douglas fir tree appears to be the most commonly adopted flag of the Cascadian movement. Designed in the academic year of 1994–1995 by Portland, Oregon native and Cascadian bioregional awareness activist Alexander Baretich, its blue represents sky and the Pacific Ocean, the white represents clouds and snow, and the green represents the forest. As of 2010, the "Doug" has also been adopted by the Portland Timbers supporters group Timbers Army, sometimes of giant size, although the flag is also raised by Seattle and Vancouver supporters, as well. The three teams compete in the supporter-sponsored Cascadia Cup. In 2010, Hopworks Urban Brewery in Portland introduced Secession Black IPA with the Doug flag as part of its label.
- Ernest Callenbach's environmental Utopian novel Ecotopia (1975) follows an American reporter, William Weston, on his tour through a secretive republic (the former Washington, Oregon, and northern California) 20 years after their secession from the U.S. At first wary and uncomfortable, Weston is shown a society that has been centrally planned, scaled down, and readapted to fit within the constraints of environmental sustainability.
- The 2005 North American Science Fiction Convention (or NASFiC), Cascadia Con, presented itself as a Cascadian convention, using material from the Republic of Cascadia website, and other sources.
- In 2010, Lloyd Vivola, an artist, bioregion supporter and environmental activist, wrote and recorded a song called "O Cascadia – A Folk Anthem for the Pacific Northwest".
- The documentary Occupied Cascadia (2012) is focused on bioregionalism and environmentalism, and explores concepts of decolonization, and the growth of the Cascadia independence movement.
- In 2013, the Cascadia Association Football Federation (CAFF) was founded and admitted to the N.F.-Board at their annual general meeting in Munich. Later that year they joined ConIFA.
- The title of the 2016 book Once in Blockadia, a mixed-media collection of poetry released by Canadian activist and poet, Stephen Collis, was named, in part, after Cascadia to reflect the author's identity.
- The 2016 book Towards Cascadia explores the societal identity of the Pacific Northwest, the concepts of bioregionalism and freedom, pressing civic issues, and the possibility of Cascadian independence achieved both peacefully and constitutionally.
- In 2017, the Cascadia Association Football Federation qualified for ConIFA's 2018 World Football Cup. In 2018, they sent a soccer team to the 2018 ConIFA World Football Cup in London captained by former Seattle Sounders FC defender James Riley. This would mark the first time a team from North America played in a ConIFA competition.
- In 2018, an orchestral version of Lloyd Vivola's song "O Cascadia" was adopted by the Cascadia National Team. On June 2, 2018, it along with the Barawan anthem was played prior to the kickoff of their match vs Barawa at Carshalton Athletic FC's War Memorial Sports Ground in Sutton. They earned sixth place.
- In 2019, the Vancouver-based band Said the Whale released an album called "Cascadia".
- The 2020 video game Project Wingman depicts a war loosely based on the concept of Cascadian independence that takes place in a post-apocalyptic Earth with drastically altered geography and geopolitics. United Cascadia, which includes Alaska and parts of the North American West Coast which have become an island, is shown seceding from a superpower, the Pacific Federation, which comprises the Pacific Rim rather than the continent alone.

== See also ==
- Secession in the United States
- Secession in Canada
- Oregon boundary dispute
- Lincoln (proposed Northwestern state)
- Jefferson (proposed Pacific state)
- Greater Idaho movement
- North American integration
- Cascadia Cup, a trophy which is awarded each season to the best Major League Soccer team in the Pacific Northwest
- Left Coast
- Northwest Territorial Imperative
