= Lumentum =

American technology company

Lumentum Holdings Inc.
- Type: Public
- Traded as: Nasdaq: LITE; Nasdaq-100 component; S&P 500 component
- Predecessor: JDSU
- Founded: 2015; 11 years ago
- Headquarters: San Jose, California, U.S.
- Key people: Penelope Herscher (chairman); Michael Hurlston (president and CEO)
- Revenue: ▲US$1.65 billion (2025)
- Operating income: ▲US$−180 million (2025)
- Net income: ▲US$25.9 million (2025)
- Total assets: ▲US$4.22 billion (2025)
- Total equity: ▲US$1.13 billion (2025)
- Number of employees: 10,562 (2025)
- Website: lumentum.com

Lumentum Holdings Inc. is an American manufacturer of optical and photonic products. It was created in 2015 as a spinoff from JDSU.

== Background ==
Lumentum was founded on August 1, 2015 as a spinoff from JDSU, which changed its name to Viavi Solutions.

Lumentum is regarded as a leader in optics and advanced manufacturing. Broadly speaking, they are a communication component manufacturer. Among the end uses for their optical components are networking equipment for telecommunications and commercial lasers deployment for industrial, oversight, and scientific lab use.

Among their products is a class of transceiver described as an optical circuit switch that is part of the artificial intelligence hardware stack. They primarily produce optical and photonic products in two sectors of the economy: Cloud & Networking and Industrial Tech. In the former sector, they provide optical and photonic chips, components, modules, and subsystems. In the latter sector, they produce a broad spectrum of lasers.

== History ==
Following the close of trading on July 31, 2015, JDSU took the name Viavi and moved from the S&P MidCap 400 Index (making way for the addition of Catalent) to the S&P SmallCap 600 Index (replacing Susquehanna Bancshares) and Lumentum was added to the S&P 600 following trading on August 3, 2015 (replacing Comstock Resources). Lumentum shares began trading on the NASDAQ stock market under the ticker symbol LITE on August 4. On April 4, 2018, Lumentum was moved to the S&P Midcap index (replacing MSCI and making way for C&J Energy Services). On March 6, 2026, S&P Global announced that it was promoting Lumentum from the S&P MidCap 400 to the S&P 500 effective on the open of trading on March 23. On May 11, Nasdaq announced that Lumentum would replace CoStar Group (CSGP) in the Nasdaq-100 Index before the opening bell on May 18, 2026.

On March 2, 2026, Nvidia made two $2 billion strategic investments in photonics technologies companies: one in Lumentum and one in Coherent Corp..

On November 2, 2026, Marvell Technology announced the acquisition of Lumentum in an all-stock deal. Lumentum shareholders would retain 33% of the combined company and the deal was expected to close in the first half of 2028.

== Finances ==
Financial Results
Fiscal Year*	Net Revenue	Operating Profit	Net Income
2026	$3.01B	$524mm	-$6.9B
2025	$1.64B	-$180mm	-$172mm
2024	$1.36B	$26mm	-$547mm
2023	$1.77B	-$116mm	-$132mm
2022	$1.71B	$303mm	$199mm
2021	$1.74B	$527mm	$397mm

* Fiscal Year ends in June
