= Viavi Solutions =

U.S. technology company

Viavi Solutions Inc.
- Type: Public
- Traded as: Nasdaq: VIAV; S&P 400 component
- Predecessor: JDSU
- Founded: 2015; 11 years ago
- Headquarters: Chandler, Arizona, U.S.
- Key people: Richard Belluzzo (chairman); Oleg Khaykin (president and CEO)
- Revenue: ▼US$1.00 billion (2024)
- Operating income: ▼US$20.8 million (2024)
- Net income: ▼US$−26 million (2024)
- Total assets: ▼US$1.74 billion (2024)
- Total equity: ▼US$682 million (2024)
- Number of employees: 3,600 (2024)
- Website: viavisolutions.com

Viavi Solutions Inc. (stylized VIAVI Solutions), formerly part of JDS Uniphase Corporation (JDSU), is an American network test, measurement and assurance technology company based in Chandler, Arizona. The company manufactures testing and monitoring equipment for networks. It also develops optical technology used for a range of applications including material quality control, currency anti-counterfeiting and 3D motion sensing, including Microsoft's Kinect video game controller.

The company was created in August 2015 when JDSU split into Viavi Solutions and Lumentum Holdings.

== History ==
=== As JDSU ===
Viavi Solutions' history dates back to 1979 when Uniphase was started in a San Jose, California, garage, as a manufacturer of lasers for chip makers and scanners. Through mergers and acquisitions, the company eventually became known as JDS Uniphase, or simply JDSU. In August 2015, JDSU split into two new independent companies: Viavi Solutions and Lumentum Holdings, which was JDSU's former Communications and Commercial Optical products division.

=== Post-JDSU ===
In August 2015, after the JDSU split, former CEO Tom Waechter stepped down and Viavi Solutions appointed Richard Belluzzo as interim president and CEO.

In September 2015, the company announced the release of GigaStor Software Edition, software designed to capture packet data from software-defined networking (SDN) platforms, for purposes of performance and forensic analysis.

In February 2016, Belluzzo became Chairman and Oleg Khaykin became president and CEO. The same month, the company announced that Frontier Communications had selected Viavi's Ethernet Assurance Solution (EtherASSURE) for help with network performance management, troubleshooting and service level agreement (SLA) management. Also in February 2016, Viavi Solutions added functionality to its CellAdvisor Base Station Analyzer to allow baseband testing during tower installation, in order to reduce the number of tower climbs and improve safety. The company also announced the GEOson network automation and management tool for 4G and 5G network testing, developed with technology from earlier acquisitions of networking companies Reverb Networks and Arieso.

In March 2016, the company announced it had added a fully DOCSIS 3.1 (D3.1)-compliant signal meter to its OneExpert CATV Signal Analysis Meter, allowing service providers to test D3.1 signals in the field. Also in March 2016, the company announced MicroNIR near infrared spectrometer tools that allow quality control managers to inspect organic materials in the field.

In July 2016, the company partnered with fellow networking vendor Brocade to use Brocade's Packet Broker and Session Director tools to capture and send subscriber traffic to Viavi’s xSIGHT Targeted Subscriber Search (TSS) for analysis.

In March 2024, it was announced the board of Spirent – a British multinational telecommunications testing company, had accepted a £1 billion takeover offer from Viavi, but was subsequently outbid by Keysight with a £1.16 billion offer later that month. This led Spirent to withdraw its support for the Viavi deal and recommend Keysight's offer. On October 16, 2025, VIAVI Solutions Inc. acquired Spirent Communications plc’s high-speed Ethernet, network security and channel emulation testing business (collectively, the “HSE, Network Security and CE Business”) from Keysight Technologies, Inc.

== Products ==
=== Network Enablement (NE) ===
The Network Enablement segment develops testing products for broadband/IP network operators to build and maintain their networks. The products are used in lab and production environments as well as in the field. NE products are divided into wireline, wireless and lab groups. The company also produces the StrataSync cloud management platform for remote data collection and management for its equipment.

Viavi's wireline NE group consists of performance monitoring; Ethernet service assurance; and video analytics and assurance products. The company produces compact optical network field testers under the brand name T-BERD in the US, and MTS in Europe. The devices support network rates up to 100G. The company produces the OneExpert line of handheld signal meters which are used to install and troubleshoot cable service (OneExpert CATV) up to DOCSIS 3.1 (D3.1) and telco service (OneExpert xDSL) up to G.fast.

The wireless NE group includes CellAdvisor, a portable tester for testing radio frequency (RF) signals over fiber. It allows baseband testing during cell tower installation, in order to reduce the number of tower climbs and improve safety.

Lab testing equipment in the NE group includes the Optical Network Tester (ONT) product family, which is designed for testing multi-protocol and multi-rate services, for optical network elements designed to carry 100G, 400G and other high-speed optical network technologies. The group also produces the Xgig 1000, a lab-based tester for iSCSI and Fibre Channel protocols used with Storage Area Networks.

=== Service Enablement (SE) ===
The SE segment provides systems and services for broadband/IP network operators and data centers.

EtherASSURE is Ethernet equipment for testing physical and virtual networks. xSIGHT is a customer service tool for mobile operators, for scaling and monitoring wireless technologies such as 4G. The GEOson network automation and management tool automates management of 4G and 5G networks by combining machine learning and geolocation data. The Observer family of service enablement products includes Observer Gigastor, a packet capture and analysis tool for enterprises, and Observer SightOps, a tool for cloud and on-premises monitoring. The Observer Gigastor product came from Viavi's-predecessor JDSU's 2013 acquisition of Network Instruments, and the Observer Sightops product came from a partnership with network monitoring company ScienceLogic.

=== Optical Security and Performance Products (OSP) ===
The OSP segment utilizes optical coating technology for anti-counterfeiting products, and other optics.

The anti-counterfeiting products are Optically Variable Pigment (OVP) and the newer Optically Variable Magnetic Pigment (OVMP), colors used in modern currency to create color shifting effects. The group also supports anti-counterfeiting efforts by producing hard to copy labels for pharmaceutical and consumer-electronics products.

The group's ChromaFlair color-shifting paint is used by automobile manufacturers.

The group's optical thin-film coating technology is used for light sensors; 3D sensors, used with Microsoft's Kinect video game platform; wafer level patterning; linear variable filters, and for coating large scale optics. The group also manufactures MicroNIR Spectrometers that are used in the field for real-time, non-destructive chemical and physical analysis of materials and monitoring of processes.

The group's optical products for aerospace and defense include optics for guidance systems, laser eye protection and signature management. The company makes optical coatings for space programs, such as the filter assembly NASA used in the OVIRS instrument for the OSIRIS-REx Mission which was sent to study a near-Earth asteroid, Bennu.
