= Doug flag =

Unofficial flag of the Cascadia bioregion

Cascadian Flag
- Doug flag
- Use: Regional and cultural
- Proportion: 3:5
- Adopted: 1995
- Design: Horizontal triband of blue, white, and green, charged with a dark central silhouette of a single Douglas Fir tree
- Designed by: Alexander Baretich

The Doug flag, also referred to as the Cascadian flag or the Cascadia Doug flag and nicknamed "Old Doug" or simply "the Doug", is one of the primary symbols and an unofficial flag of the Cascadia bioregion, which roughly encompasses the U.S. states of Idaho, Oregon and Washington, the Canadian province of British Columbia, and other parts of North America's Pacific Northwest. It was designed by Portland, Oregon native Alexander Baretich in the academic year of 1994–1995. It is named after the Douglas fir, featured on the flag.

== Conception and description ==
The Doug flag was designed by Portland, Oregon native Alexander Baretich in the academic year of 1994–1995. He recalled:

I designed the Cascadian flag, aka the Doug, way back in the mid-1990s when I was a graduate student studying in Eastern Europe. Though I totally love the people, cultures and landscape of Eastern Europe, I was deeply homesick for the forests of Cascadia, specifically the Willamette Valley forests I grew up around. One day as I sat on a hill with my companion, I had this vision of a flag where the Cascadian landscape came to mind. Prior to the design and its popularity, the idea of Cascadia–specifically the bioregion–was pretty much an abstract concept reserved for radical geographers and hip sociologists. The flag conveys something far more tangible than an abstract concept of demarcation of space; the flag captures that love of living communities in our bioregion. Unlike many flags, this is not a flag of blood, nor of the glory of a nation, but a love of the bioregion; our ecological family and its natural boundaries; the place in which we live and love.

According to the Cascadia Department of Bioregion, the flag symbolizes "the natural beauty and inspiration that the Pacific Northwest provides, and is a direct representation of the bioregion".

The flag is a tricolor consisting of three horizontal stripes of blue, white, and green, charged with a single Douglas fir tree in the center. The blue stripe represents the sky, Pacific Ocean and Salish Sea, as well as myriad rivers in the bioregion including the Columbia, the Snake, and Fraser Rivers. The white represents clouds and snow and the green represents the region's countless fields and evergreen forests. The tree symbolizes "endurance, defiance and resilience against fire, flood, catastrophic change, and ever increasingly against the anthropocentric man". According to Baretich and CascadiaNow!, "all these symbols of color and images come together to symbolize what being Cascadian is all about."

Scheme	Blue	White	Green	Dark green
Chromatic	X=10.2 Y=4.8 Z=50.3	N/A	X=4.0 Y=7.9 Z=1.5	X=0.6 Y=1.1 Z=0.2
CMYK	91.85.0.25	0.0.0.0	91.0.95.64	100.0.100.87
RGB	(18,28,192)	(255,255,255)	(8,93,5)	(0,34,0)
Hexadecimal	#121CC0	#FFFFFF	#085D05	#002200

== Usage ==
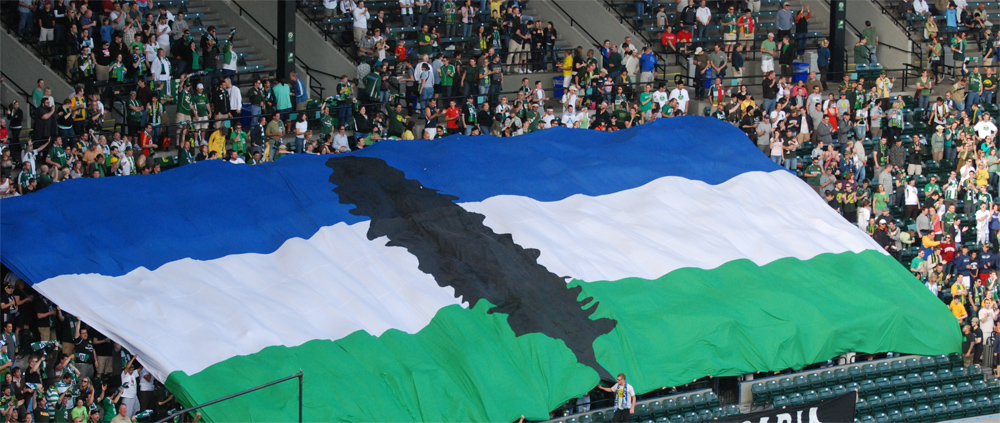
The flag being carried by fans at a Portland Timbers game in Portland, Oregon in 2010

The Cascadian Flag is copyrighted by Alexander Baretich and his company the Cascadian Flag Cooperative, Inc., which claims to enforce protection of the ideals espoused by the flag's creator in its use.

Since its inception, Baretich's design has gained popularity and earned status as the unofficial flag of Cascadia. In 2014, Kelton Sears of Vice said the flag "has quickly become the dominant symbol of the nascent Cascadian identity", appearing on microbreweries' beer labels and at local events, including Portland Timbers games, gay pride parades, environmental protests, and activities affiliated with the Occupy movement. The flag appeared for some time on boxes of beer from Phillips Brewing in Victoria, British Columbia, though this no longer appears to be the case. The Seattle-based folk band Fleet Foxes included the flag on the back of their 2011 studio album Helplessness Blues.

In 2015, Baretich expressed his hope that his designs "would not be used for hate, exploitation, and anything that goes against the values or principles of bioregionalism". Furthermore, he said, "In seeking out a bioregional flag, I believe that it's the bioregion that captures the artist—not the artist capturing the bioregion."

The flag featured as part of Seattle Sounders FC's 2021–2022 home jersey, being displayed on the back near the neckline.

== See also ==
- 1994 in art
- Cascadia movement
