= Edward R. McCracken =

American corporate exectuve

- Born: Edward Ray McCracken; December 1943 (age 82)
- Occupation: Executive
- Known for: CEO of Silicon Graphics

Edward Ray McCracken (born December 1943) is an American businessman who was CEO of Silicon Graphics (SGI) from 1984 to 1997. Under his leadership, SGI grew from annual revenues of $5.4 million to $3.7 billion. Prior to leading Silicon Graphics, he spent 16 years as an executive with Hewlett-Packard.

McCracken became Chairman of SGI's board in 1994. He also served on the boards of Digital Research and National Semiconductor.

He was a "White House regular" during the Clinton administration and appeared with Bill Clinton and Al Gore to promote the benefits of technology.

== Education ==
McCracken earned a Bachelor of Science in Electrical Engineering from Iowa State University in 1966 and an MBA from Stanford University.

== Awards ==
- Professional Achievement Citation in Engineering award from Iowa State University College of Engineering in 1992.
- Executive of the Year, R&D Magazine, 1995.
- National Medal of Technology and Innovation, 1995 which noted "his groundbreaking work in the areas of affordable 3D visual computing and super computing technologies; and for his technical and leadership skills in building Silicon Graphics, Inc., into a global advanced technology company."

Preceded by James H. Clark	CEO Silicon Graphics; 1994–1998	Succeeded by Richard Belluzzo
