= Richard Belluzzo =

American businessman

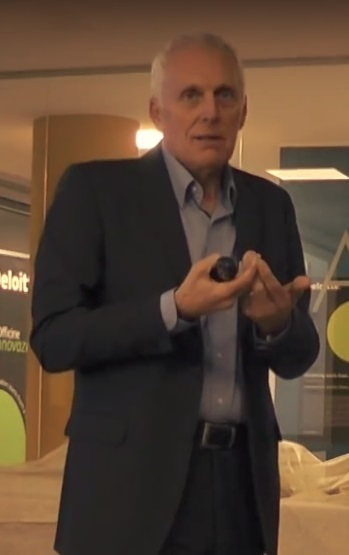
- Belluzzo delivering a lecture in 2017
- Born: Richard Belluzzo; November 26, 1953 (age 72); San Francisco, California
- Education: Golden Gate University

Richard "Rick" Belluzzo (born November 26, 1953) is an American businessman who worked as an executive at Hewlett-Packard (HP), Silicon Graphics (SGI), Microsoft (MS), Quantum Corp. (QTM), and Viavi Solutions (VIAV). He has served on the board of directors of several technology companies. He holds a Bachelor of Science degree in accounting from Golden Gate University.

Belluzzo worked for HP for 23 years, with his last role being executive vice president of their computer division. He moved to SGI in January 1998, becoming chairman of the board and CEO, succeeding Edward R. McCracken. During his time in the systems business, Belluzzo led both HP and SGI through the transition from proprietary systems to industry standard solutions. These actions were controversial at the time. SGI lost money five out of the six quarters Belluzzo ran the company.

In August 1999, Belluzzo left SGI to head Microsoft's MSN division, and then the whole Consumer business, leading several emerging efforts, including the launch of the first Xbox. In February 2001, he became president and chief operating officer of Microsoft, running the day-to-day business during the critical CEO transition from Bill Gates to Steve Ballmer. In September 2002, he was appointed CEO at Quantum Corp., where he managed the transformation of the company from tape drives to storage systems. In August 2015 he was appointed Interim CEO at Viavi Solutions, and finished the break-up of JDSU into two public companies.

After leaving Quantum, Belluzzo began working with Italian Startups in both the US and Italy, becoming an investor in several companies. In 2017 he became a partner at Venture Capital firm Innogest Capital.

In 2017 he was awarded the honor of Cavaliere Della Repubblica Italiana (Italian Knighthood) by the President of the Italian Republic.

Preceded by	CEO Quantum; 2002–2011	Succeeded by Jon Gacek
Preceded by Edward R. McCracken	CEO Silicon Graphics; 1998–1999	Succeeded by Robert Bishop
Preceded by Bob Herbold	President and COO Microsoft; 2001–2002	Succeeded by
