= Brad Smith (American lawyer) =

American lawyer (born 1959)

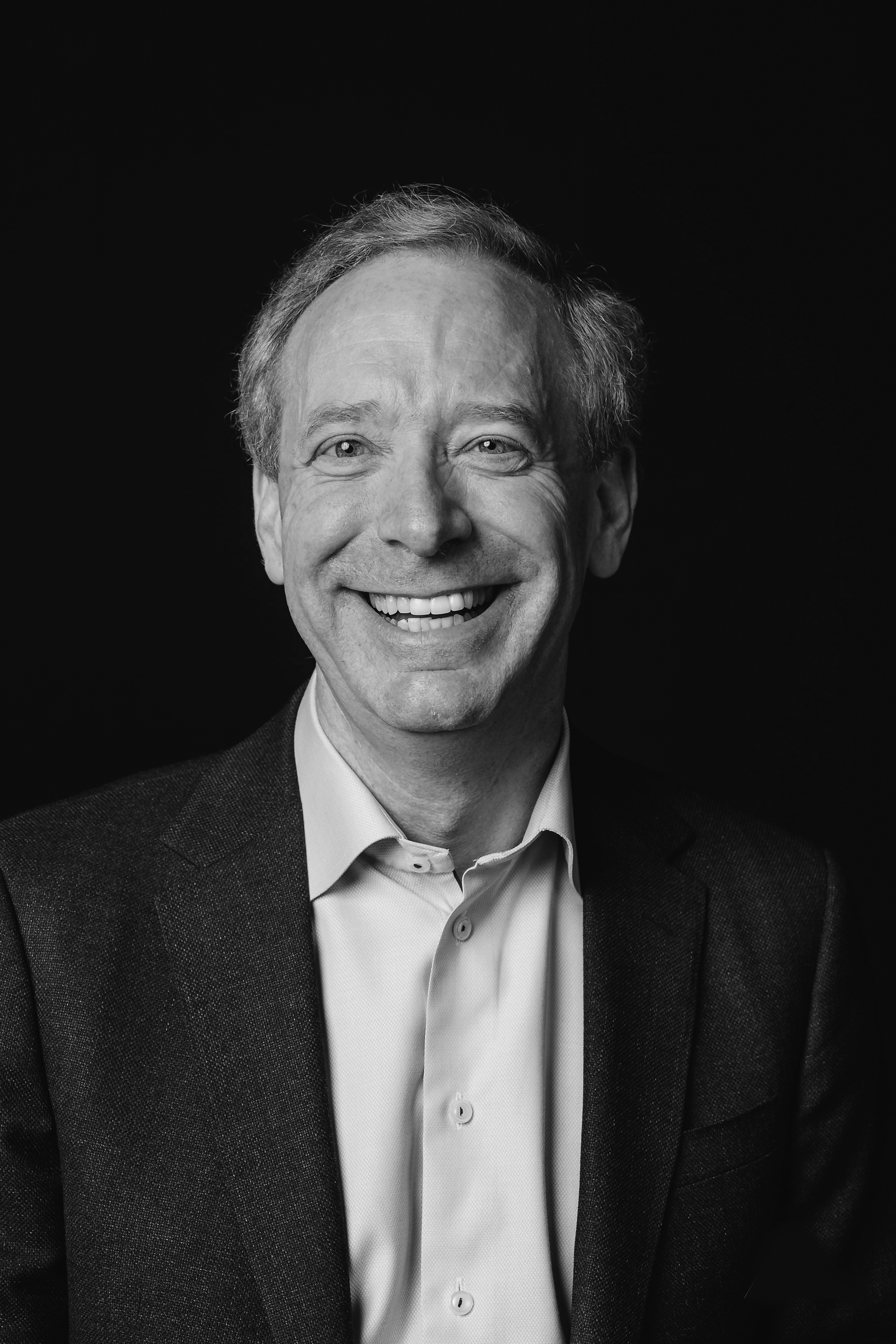
- Smith at the Web Summit in 2017
- Born: Bradford Lee Smith; January 17, 1959 (age 67); Milwaukee, Wisconsin, U.S.
- Education: Princeton University (BA); Graduate Institute of International Studies; Columbia University (JD)
- Spouse: Kathy Surace
- Children: 2

Bradford Lee Smith (born January 17, 1959) is an American attorney and business executive who became vice chairman of Microsoft in 2021, and president in 2015. He previously was a senior vice president and general counsel from 2002 to 2015.

== Early life and family ==
Smith was born January 17, 1959, in Milwaukee, Wisconsin. His father was an engineer and manager at Wisconsin Bell and moved the family around the state several times . Smith graduated from Appleton West High School in Appleton, Wisconsin, where he was student body president and editor of the school paper; while class president, he brokered one of his first deals, a school hall pass system.

Smith met his wife Kathy Surace-Smith while they were undergraduates at Princeton University. Smith studied in the Woodrow Wilson School of Public and International Affairs and graduated with a B.A. in 1981 after completing a 199-page long senior thesis titled "The Politics of Refugees: The Development and Promotion of International Refugee Law". Smith and his wife graduated from Princeton together in 1981 and both continued to Columbia Law School. They married in 1983, and spent the school year of 1983–84 studying international law at the Graduate Institute of International Studies in Switzerland, before returning to Columbia to graduate in 1985. Surace-Smith is vice president and general counsel of Seattle biotech company NanoString Technologies. They have a son, born in 1992, and a daughter born in 1995.

== Career ==
Smith's first job after graduation was as law clerk to United States federal judge Charles Miller Metzner. In 1986, he joined the Washington, D.C. law firm Covington & Burling. He had one condition for the job: to have his own personal computer. He was the first person in the firm with one; it ran Microsoft Word version 1.0. Smith worked for three years in Washington D.C., and four in London, running Covington's software practice there. By 1993, he had become a partner.

=== Microsoft ===
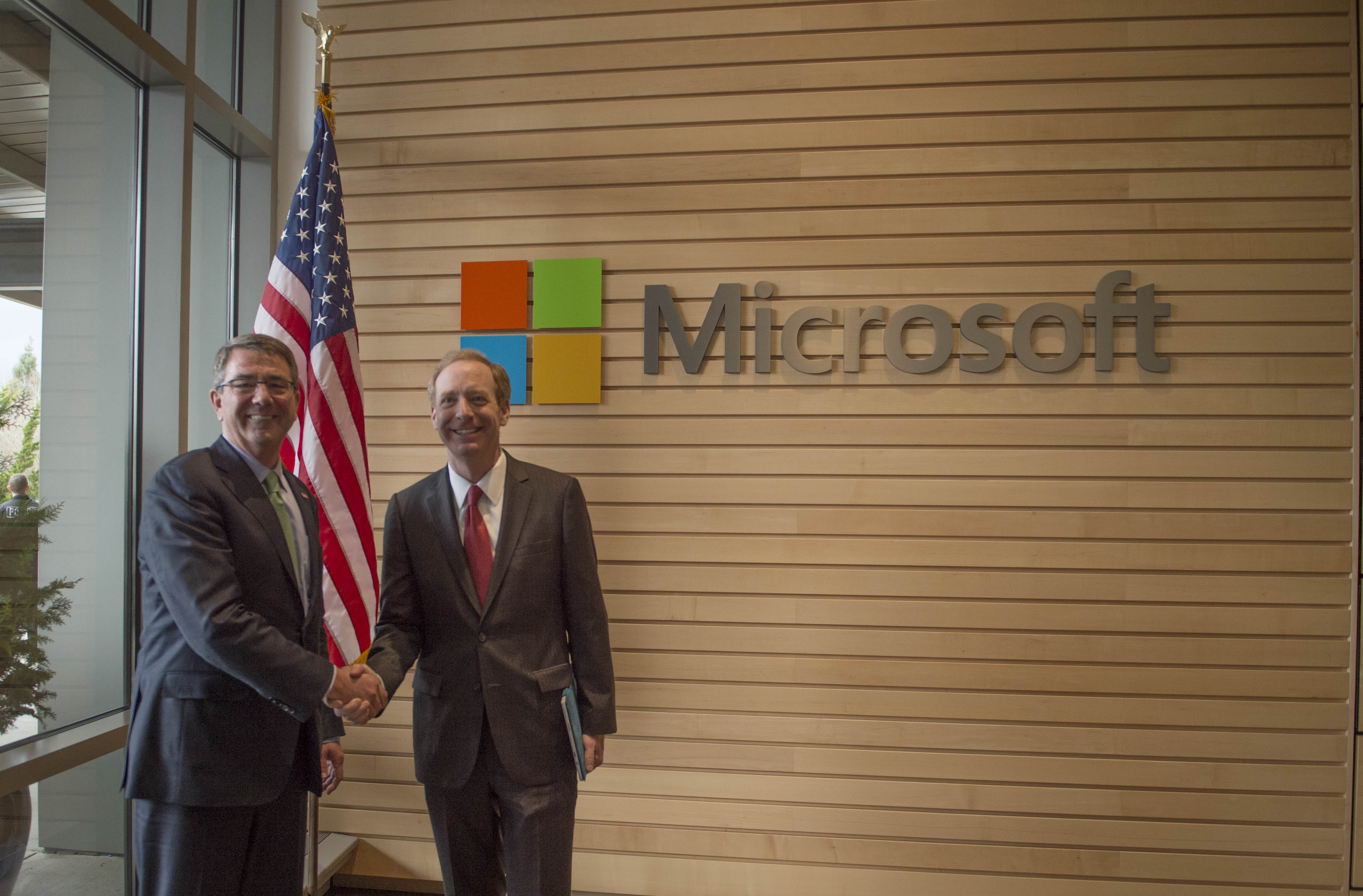
Brad Smith meeting with Secretary of Defense Ash Carter in 2016

Smith joined Microsoft in 1993 and oversaw the resolution of the company's antitrust cases. For three years he led its Legal and Corporate Affairs team in Europe, then five years as deputy general counsel, before being named general counsel in 2002 and senior vice president. As Microsoft's general counsel, Smith worked as lawyer, politician, and diplomat. In 2001, Microsoft had just settled United States v. Microsoft Corp., a four-year antitrust battle about bundling the Internet Explorer web browser with the Microsoft Windows operating system. Smith's application for the general counsel position in late 2001 included a PowerPoint presentation of a single slide that said: "time to make peace." Microsoft chairman Bill Gates and CEO Steve Ballmer agreed. Smith has been described as conciliatory toward competitors and regulators. He led negotiations to settle cases with several of Microsoft's competitors, including AOL Time-Warner, Sun Microsystems, and Be Inc., paying $5 billion to plaintiffs, aiming for win-win resolutions, and garnering praise from their chief counsels. Smith also oversaw negotiations with the European Commission over antitrust accusations, meeting foreign leaders, lobbying, and settling most issues in 2010.

Internally, Smith pushed for diversity within the company's legal division, making executive bonuses dependent on Microsoft and associated law firms' increasing employment of racial minority, women, and LGBT employees, and committing pro bono hours for immigrants. In 2008, the goals were not met, and Microsoft executives donated their bonuses to charity; the diversity goals were met every subsequent year. In 2013, the National Law Journal named him one of "The 100 Most Influential Lawyers in America".

By 2014, Smith was the longest running member of Microsoft's top leadership, and considered "a de facto ambassador for the technology industry at large," winning plaudits for diplomacy from State Department officials like Anne-Marie Slaughter and Stuart Eizenstat. He filed four different lawsuits defending customer data against the U.S. government from 2013 to 2016 and was a noted supporter of Apple Inc. when the FBI demanded access to a locked iPhone. He was able to organize a Reform Government Surveillance coalition including rivals such as Google, Yahoo!, and Apple, Inc. to support Microsoft in Microsoft Corp. v. United States, an ongoing case initially filed in 2013 in which the company challenges the right of the United States to get access to a user email stored in Ireland.

Smith was promoted to president and chief legal officer of Microsoft in 2015 by CEO Satya Nadella, becoming the first President of Microsoft since Richard Belluzzo in 2002. In these roles, Smith is responsible for Microsoft's corporate, external, and legal affairs, and is also the firm's chief compliance officer. Within three months in his new position, Smith announced the launch of Microsoft Philanthropies, a branch of the company dedicated to donating money and services to the public good. In the following two years, Microsoft Philanthropies donated tens of millions in grants to education and refugee organizations, and hundreds of millions in Microsoft Azure cloud computing services to nonprofits and researchers.

As Microsoft president, Smith continued being called a leader of the tech industry on privacy and immigration. He asked the Trump administration for an exception to its travel ban and said Microsoft would defend its employees affected by the revocation of Deferred Action for Childhood Arrivals (DACA). Smith called for a "digital Geneva convention" in February 2017 at the RSA cybersecurity conference in San Francisco, reiterated his suggestion after the WannaCry ransomware attack believed to come from the government of North Korea, and presented the idea to the United Nations at Geneva in November 2017. The convention would be an international treaty governing state-sponsored cyberwarfare, protecting civilian infrastructure, and guaranteeing the neutrality of technology companies, to be overseen by an international body modeled after the International Atomic Energy Agency or the Red Cross that would monitor the agreement and identify offenders. Also in 2017, he entered Microsoft into a partnership with the Office of the United Nations High Commissioner for Human Rights that the Office called "groundbreaking" and "landmark", donating $5 million over five years to develop technology to support the Office's human rights work. He led Microsoft into two ambitious initiatives to bring technology to rural America, the Rural Airband Initiative, which would bring broadband Internet access to 12 states by 2022 using unused television channel frequencies, and the TechSpark program to invest in technology jobs in six rural and smaller metropolitan areas, starting with North Dakota and Wisconsin.

In January 2025, Smith wrote a blog about Microsoft's "Golden Opportunity for American AI", saying "The country has a unique opportunity to pursue this vision and build on the foundational ideas set for AI policy during President Trump's first term" and "If the Trump Administration can develop a strong national AI talent strategy and use AI to make the government itself more effective and efficient, it will put the country on a promising path."

=== Other boards ===
In 2014, Smith was named to the Board of Trustees of Princeton University for a four-year term. He has been on the Code.org board of directors since 2013, the year it was founded, and on the Netflix board of directors since 2015. From 2016 to 2017, Smith was on the U.S. Commerce Department's Digital Economy Board of Advisors.

== Civic work ==
Smith chairs the nonprofit Kids in Need of Defense (KIND), which he co-founded with actress Angelina Jolie in 2008. KIND provides pro bono free legal support to unaccompanied immigrant children who are facing deportation in eight of the largest US cities. It is funded by Microsoft and donated hours from law firms and corporate departments across the country.

From 2009 to 2016, Smith was the chair and a founding board member of the Leadership Council on Legal Diversity, an organization of corporate chief legal officers and law firm managing partners dedicated to diversity in the legal profession.

Smith is chairman of the board of and helped create the Washington State Opportunity Scholarship which gives grants to low- and middle-income students earning bachelor's degrees in Science, technology, engineering, and mathematics (STEM) and health care. The public-private partnership has raised $190 million since its founding in 2011, including $35 million from Microsoft, $25 million from Boeing, and $25 million from the Washington State Legislature.

He shares other charity work with his wife, Kathy Surace-Smith. They chaired the King County, Washington United Way campaign for 2011, raising $120 million. They are also prominent supporters of their alma mater Columbia Law School: Surace-Smith is a trustee of Columbia University and co-chairs the school Annual Fund; in 2004 the couple established the Smith Family Opportunity Scholarship, which helps less represented international students attend the school; and in 2017 they became co-chairs of the school fundraising campaign, and made a $1.25 million gift for the Columbia Human Rights Clinic. In February 2022, the Smiths donated an additional $5 million to the Human Rights Clinic.
