= Pacific Coast Collaborative =

The Pacific Coast Collaborative is an international governmental agency formed on June 30, 2008, including the governments of British Columbia, Washington, Oregon and California.

The Collaborative elected to study a high-speed rail corridor between metropolitan areas in the member states. California High-Speed Rail Authority has begun construction of their state's high-speed rail system, while the governments of Washington and British Columbia plan to conduct a high-speed rail study for the Pacific Northwest Corridor in 2018.

Other regional issues taken up by the group include environmental protection, the opioid crisis, and food waste.
