= JDSU =

American optics company, 1979–2015

Coordinates: 37.4365°N 121.923°W

JDS Uniphase Corporation
- Type: Public
- Traded as: Nasdaq: JDSU
- Industry: Optical products and broadband communications
- Predecessors: JDS Fitel; Uniphase Corporation (1999)
- Founded: 1981; 45 years ago
- Defunct: 2015
- Fate: Split into 2 new companies
- Successors: Viavi Solutions; Lumentum Holdings
- Headquarters: Milpitas, California, U.S.
- Number of locations: 80 offices, serving customers in more than 160 countries
- Key people: Thomas H. Waechter (CEO, president and Director); David W. Vellequette (CFO)
- Products: Communications test and measurement equipment; optical communications components, modules, and subsystems.; Lasers used for biotechnology, semiconductor manufacturing, and materials processing.; Thin film coatings, components, and assemblies used to manage light for displays, instrumentation, office automation, and aerospace/defense.; Optical solutions for brand protection and document authentication; and decorative coatings for brand enhancement and differentiation
- Revenue: ▼US$ 1.709 billion (2015)
- Operating income: ▼US$ -88.1 million (2015)
- Net income: ▼US$ -88.1 million (2015)
- Total assets: ▼US$ 2.218 billion (2015)
- Total equity: ▼US$ 1.101 billion (2015)
- Number of employees: 5,100 (2015)
- Website: JDSU.com at the Wayback Machine (archived 1 August 2015)

JDS Uniphase Corporation (JDSU) was an American company that designed and manufactured products for optical communications networks, communications test and measurement equipment, lasers, optical solutions for authentication and decorative applications, and other custom optics. It was headquartered in Milpitas, California. In August 2015, JDSU split into two different companies – Viavi Solutions and Lumentum Holdings.

== History ==
Uniphase was started in 1979 in a San Jose, California garage by former Spectra Physics employees, namely Dale E. Crane and Bob Jones, and made lasers for chip makers and scanners. The spectrum was widened from He-Ne lasers to Argon Ion lasers for research and medical equipment. In 1991 Uniphase had with roughly 180.000 He-Ne lasers produced a market share of more than 50 percent worldwide.

In 1981, JDS Optics was founded in Ottawa, Ontario by Philip Garel-Jones, Gary Duck, Jozef Straus, and Bill Sinclair. The "JDS" is short for Jones, Duck and Straus/Sinclair. The company became JDS Fitel when it formed a partnership with Fitel, a fiber optic and optical connector company.

In 1999, JDSU was formed by the merger between JDS Fitel and Uniphase, and it became known as JDS Uniphase subsequent to the merger.

Three other major fiber companies were acquired by JDS Uniphase during the telecom boom – Optical Coating Laboratory Inc. (OCLI), bought for $6.2 billion and based in Santa Rosa, California, E-TEK Dynamics, bought for $15 billion, and SDL, bought for $45 billion, both based in San Jose, California.

In 2003, CEO Straus retired, and the company moved its headquarters to San Jose, California, to consolidate its business.

On August 3, 2005, the company acquired test and measurement equipment company Acterna for $760 million, which became part of JDSU's Test and Measurement Group. Acterna had been formed by the May 2000 merger of network test solutions developer Wavetek Wandel Goltermann (WWG) and hand-held test equipment developer TTC.

In 2006, the company moved its headquarters to Milpitas, California.

In December 2013, the company announced it was acquiring fellow network performance management company Network Instruments, for $200 million.

On August 1, 2015, JDSU split into Viavi Solutions and Lumentum Holdings Inc.

=== Stock ===
During the 1990s, JDS Uniphase stock was a high-flyer tech stock investor favorite. Its stock price doubled three times and three stock splits of 3:1, 2:1, and 2:1 occurred roughly every 90 days during the last half of 1999 through early 2000 and further enabling JDS Uniphase to go on an acquisition and merger binge. After a downturn in the telecom industry as part of the dot com bubble, JDS Uniphase announced in late July 2001 the largest (up to then) write-down of goodwill. Employment soon dropped as part of the Global Realignment Program from nearly 29,000 to approximately 5,300, many of its factories and facilities were closed around the world, and the stock price dropped from $153 per share to less than $2 per share.

On September 23, 2005, JDSU announced a reverse stock split one-to-eight.

=== Shareholder litigation ===
After the 2001 crash of the telecommunications industry, the state of Connecticut filed a lawsuit against the company and four key executives, claiming that they had misled and hid from company shareholders advance knowledge of the company's impending downturn. Unlike most similar lawsuits, which are dismissed or settled before trial, Connecticut's lawsuit went to trial in October 2007. JDSU was acquitted of all charges in November 2007.
