= Cascadia (bioregion) =

Bioregion in North America

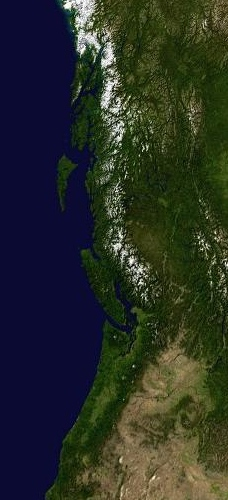
The Cascadia bioregion seen from orbit

The Cascadia bioregion is a bioregion located near the Pacific Northwest as defined through the watersheds of the Columbia, Fraser, Snake, and Klamath rivers, as defined through the geology of the region. It extends for more than 2,500 miles (4,000 kilometres) from the Copper River in Southern Alaska, to Cape Mendocino, approximately 200 miles (300 kilometres) north of San Francisco, and east as far as the Yellowstone Caldera and continental divide and contains 75 distinct ecoregions.

The Cascadia Bioregion encompasses all of the state of Washington, all but the southeastern corner of Idaho, and portions of Oregon, California, Nevada, Utah, Wyoming, Montana, Alaska, Yukon, and British Columbia. Bioregions are geographically based areas defined by land or soil composition, watershed, climate, flora, and fauna. The Cascadia Bioregion claims the entire watershed of the Columbia River (as far as the Continental Divide), the Fraser River, as well as the Cascade Range from Northern California well into Canada. It's also considered to include the associated ocean, the Cascadia Inner Sea, and seas and their ecosystems out to the continental slope running down the entirety of the Cascadia subduction zone to the Cape Mendocino Fracture Zone. The delineation of a bioregion has environmental stewardship as its primary goal, with the belief that political boundaries should match ecological and cultural boundaries.

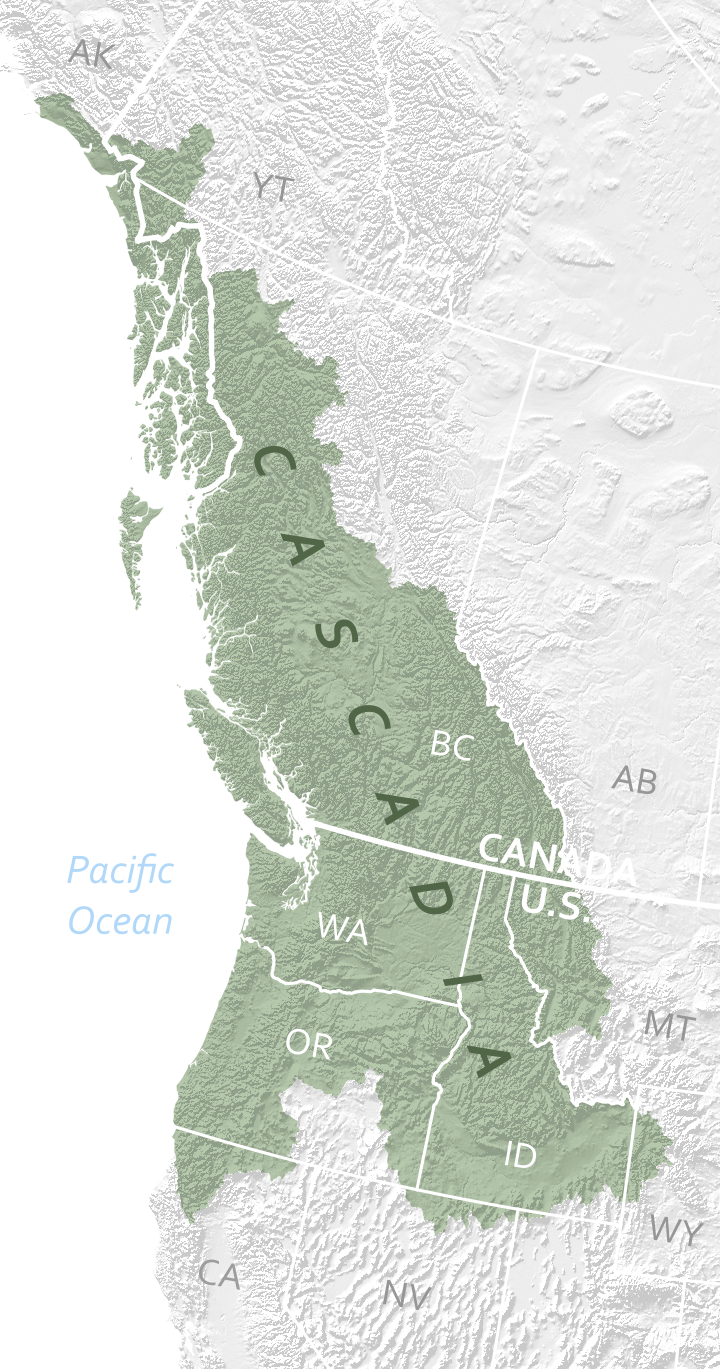
The Cascadia bioregion

The area from Vancouver, B.C. down to Portland, Oregon has been termed the Cascadia Megaregion, a megaregion defined by the U.S. and Canadian governments, especially along the "Cascadia Corridor". Megaregions are defined as areas where "boundaries begin to blur, creating a new scale of geography now known as the megaregion. These areas have interlocking economic systems, shared natural resources, and ecosystems, and common transportation systems link these population centers together. This area contains 17% of Cascadian land mass, but more than 80% of the Cascadian population. The Canada–US border is diminishing in the face of further economic, political and cultural integration with such programs as the enhanced drivers license program – which can be used to get across the Canada–US border between Washington and British Columbia.

== Etymology ==
The name "Cascadia" was first applied to the whole geologic region by Bates McKee in his 1972 geology textbook Cascadia; the geologic evolution of the Pacific Northwest. Later the name was adopted by David McCloskey, a Seattle University sociology professor, to describe it as a bioregion. McCloskey describes Cascadia as "a land of falling waters." He notes the blending of the natural integrity and the sociocultural unity that gives Cascadia its definition.

The term "Cascades" was first used for the Cascades Rapids, as early as the Astor Expedition. The earliest attested use of the term for the mountain range dates to 1825, in the writings of botanist David Douglas. During geological explorations in the early 1900s the term was first applied to the region. The name "Cascadia" was first used by the town Cascadia, Oregon that was settled in 1890 in what is now Linn County.

McCloskey is the source of the proposed Cascadian boundaries that include the complete watershed of the Columbia River, including the territories of what is now Idaho, western Montana, and smaller parts of Wyoming, Utah, and northern Nevada.

According to McCloskey, this "initial" Cascadia included parts of seven jurisdictions (Northern California, Oregon, Washington, Idaho, Western Montana, British Columbia, and Southeast Alaska), running from the northernmost reaches of Southeast Alaska in the north to Cape Mendocino, California in the south–and covering all the land and "falling waters" from the continental divide at the Rocky Mountains to the Pacific Ocean. McCloskey, founder of the Cascadia Institute and co-chair of Seattle University's New Ecological Studies Program, saw Cascadian identity as something which transcends political or geographic definitions; it is more a cultural, ideological identity.

== Cascadian bioregionalism ==
The concept of Cascadian bioregionalism is closely identified with the environmental movement. In the early 1970s, the contemporary vision of bioregionalism began to be formed through collaboration between natural scientists, social and environmental activists, artists and writers, community leaders, and back-to-the-landers who worked directly with natural resources.

A bioregion is defined in terms of the unique overall pattern of natural characteristics that are found in a specific place. The main features are generally obvious throughout a continuous geographic terrain, and include a particular climate, local aspects of seasons, landforms, watersheds, soils, and native plants and animals. People are also counted as an integral aspect of a locale's life, as can be seen in the ecologically adaptive cultures of early inhabitants, and in the activities of present-day reinhabitants who attempt to harmonize in a sustainable way with the place where they live.

Cascadian bioregionalism deals with the connected ecological, environmental, economic, and cultural ties that are prevalent throughout the U.S. Pacific Northwest and distance the area from their eastern counterparts. The argument is that those in Washington and Oregon in the United States have much more in common with those in British Columbia, Canada, than those in Washington D.C.

== Other uses ==
=== In politics ===
Cascadian bioregionalism also forms the basis for several independence movements throughout the Pacific Northwest, which base their boundaries on the bioregion of Cascadia.

== See also ==
- Cascadia movement
- Cascadia (board game)
- Bioregionalism
- Bioregion
- Ecotopia
- North American inland temperate rainforest
