= John Milton (disambiguation) =

John Milton (1608–1674) was an English poet.

John Milton may also refer to:

== People ==
- John Milton (composer) (1563–1647), English composer, father of the poet
- John Milton (Florida politician) (1807–1865), Governor of Florida and relative of the poet
- John Milton (Georgia politician) (c. 1740–1804), Georgia Secretary of State and grandfather of the Florida Governor
- John Gerald Milton (1881–1977), United Central Senator from New Jersey
- John P. Milton, 20th-century meditation instructor
- John R. Milton (1924–1995), University of South Dakota English Professor and South Dakota Review founder
- John Watson Milton, American politician and writer
- John William Milton (1948–1995), American wrestler better known by his ringname of Big John Studd
- John Milton Elliott (1820–1879), United States politician and lawyer
- John Milton Niles (1787–1856), United States editor and political figure
- John Milton Oakes (1440s–1480s), English businessman
- John Griffith Milton (1885–1915), England rugby international, played as Jumbo Milton
- Milton Johns (1938-), British actor, born as John Milton

=== Fictional ===
- John Milton, a character played by Al Pacino in the 1997 film The Devil's Advocate
- John 'Spud' Milton, the protagonist in John Howard van de Ruit's Spud series of novels
- John Milton, a character played by Nicolas Cage in the 2011 film Drive Angry

== Other ==
- John Milton (ship), the fatal 1858 shipwreck off Long Island
