= Bioregionalism =

Philosophy advocating governance and culture based on ecological and geographic regions

One scheme of potential North American bioregions based on watersheds.

Bioregionalism is a philosophy that suggests that political, cultural, and economic systems are more sustainable and fair if they are organized around naturally defined areas called bioregions (similar to ecoregions). Bioregions are defined through physical and environmental features, including watershed boundaries and soil and terrain characteristics. Bioregionalism stresses that the determination of a bioregion is also a cultural phenomenon, and emphasizes local populations, knowledge, and solutions. In the Cascadia bioregion, local organizations and communities have worked together to promote community-supported agriculture, currency, and conservation.

Bioregionalism is a concept that goes beyond national boundaries—an example is the concept of Cascadia, a region that is sometimes considered to consist of most of Oregon and Washington, the Alaska Panhandle, the far north of California and the West Coast of Canada, sometimes also including some or all of Idaho and western Montana. Another example of a bioregion, which does not cross national boundaries, but does overlap state lines, is the Ozarks, a bioregion also referred to as the Ozarks Plateau, which consists of southern Missouri, northwest Arkansas, the northeast corner of Oklahoma, southeast corner of Kansas.

Bioregions are not synonymous with ecoregions as defined by organizations such as the World Wildlife Fund, One Earth, or the Commission for Environmental Cooperation; the latter are scientifically based and focused on ecology. Bioregions, by contrast, are watershed focused, factoring in humans and informed by ecology, geology, and biology. In this way, bioregionalism is effectively kincentric ecology with a focus on bioregions.

== Overview ==
The term was coined by Allen Van Newkirk, founder of the Institute for Bioregional Research, in 1975, given currency by Peter Berg and Raymond F. Dasmann in the early 1970s, and has been advocated by writers such as David Haenke and Kirkpatrick Sale.

The bioregionalist perspective opposes a homogeneous economy and consumer culture with its lack of stewardship towards the environment. This perspective seeks to:

- Highlight the unique ecology of the bioregion.
- Encourage consumption of local foods where possible.
- Encourage the use of local materials where possible.
- Encourage the cultivation of native plants of the region.
- Encourage sustainability in harmony with the bioregion.

== Bioregions ==
Bioregions are a foundational concept within the philosophical system called Bioregionalism. A bioregion is defined along watershed and hydrological boundaries, and uses a combination of bioregional layers, beginning with the oldest "hard" lines; geology, topography, tectonics, wind, fracture zones and continental divides, working its way through the "soft" lines: living systems such as soil, ecosystems, climate, marine life, and the flora and fauna, and lastly the "human" lines: human geography, energy, transportation, agriculture, food, music, language, history, indigenous cultures, and ways of living within the context set into a place, and its limits to determine the final edges and boundaries.

Peter Berg and Judy Goldhaft who founded the Planet Drum foundation in 1973 and helped to popularize the concept of bioregions and bioregionalism, located in San Francisco and which just celebrated its 50th anniversary in 2023 defines a bioregion as the following:

A bioregion is a geographical area with coherent and interconnected plant and animal communities, and other natural characteristics (often defined by a watershed) plus the cultural values that humans have developed for living in harmony with these natural systems. Because it is a cultural idea, the description of a specific bioregion uses information from both the natural sciences and other sources. Each bioregion is a whole “life-place” with unique requirements for human inhabitation so that it will not be disrupted and injured. People are counted as an integral aspect of a place’s life.

== Bioregional mapping ==
This idea of bioregionalism is also rooted in an important concept called bioregional mapping, a powerful tool to increase understanding, change the story and influence policy. Bioregional Mapping is a participatory approach to cartography that focuses on mapping the natural, ecological and human realities of that have emerged in a place within a bioregion—an area defined by its natural boundaries, such as watersheds, ecosystems, and cultures that arise form a place, rather than human borders. This method highlights the interconnectedness of the region's natural systems and human communities, offering a holistic view of the landscape that integrates ecological data with cultural and historical insights.

A good bioregional map shows layers of geology, flora, fauna, and inhabitation over time. This approach empowers individuals to contribute to the documentation of local knowledge, history, and cultural significance, thereby creating maps that are more inclusive and representative of the lived experiences within the bioregion. Community mapping includes the identification of traditional pathways, local species, historical landmarks, stories, songs, how things change over time, and other culturally significant sites that might not appear on standard maps.

Bioregional mapping also aligns with Indigenous mapping practices by recognizing the importance of natural boundaries and the relationship between people and their environment. The idea of bioregional mapping largely grew from the Tsleil-Waututh First Nation, Nisga'a, Tsilhqotʼin, Wetʼsuwetʼen first nations who used Bioregional Mapping to create some of the first bioregional atlases as part of court cases to defend their sovereignty in the 1980s and 1990s, one such example being the Tsilhqotʼin Nation v British Columbia.

An example of a richly communicative bioregional map is David McClosky's new map of Cascadia.

== Relationship to environmentalism ==
Bioregionalism, while akin to modern environmentalism in certain aspects, such as a desire to live in harmony with nature, differs in certain ways from the 20th century movement.

According to Peter Berg, bioregionalism is proactive, and is based on forming a harmony between human culture and the natural environment, rather than being protest-based like the original environmental movement. Also, modern environmentalists saw human industry in and of itself an enemy of environmental stability, viewing nature as a victim needing to be saved; bioregionalists see humanity and its culture as a part of nature, focusing on building a positive, sustainable relationship with both the sociological and ecological environments, rather than a focus on completely preserving and segregating the wilderness from the world of humanity.

In this way the sentiments of Bioregionalism echo those of Classical Environmentalism, and early environmentalists such as Henry David Thoreau are sometimes viewed as predecessors of the Bioregionalist movement.

== History ==
Bioregionalism emerged in the 1970s, developing primarily along the western coast of North America, and specifically from a broad coalition of poets, artists, writers, community leaders, and back-to-the-landers, and from the Digger movement which had grown in the late 1960s Beat Scene in San Francisco, and as a counter to the mainstream environmental movement, which many felt was reactionary and negative. They envisioned a positive, place-based alternative to mainstream efforts within a capitalist framework, or those of nation-states or other international bodies. This included many different individuals, including "Peter Berg, Judy Goldhaft, Raymond Dasmann, Kirkpatrick Sale, Judith Plant, Eleanor Wright, Doug Aberley, Stephanie Mills, Jim Dodge, Freeman House, Van Andruss, David Haenke, and Gary Snyder", working together through the Planet Drum foundation, and similar groups to create a new place-based philosophy they called bioregionalism.

Bioregionalism also directly grew from a relationship with the civil rights and American Indian Movement, and efforts to reclaim their languages, territories and maps, and what bioregionalists saw as the global collapse of traditional ecological knowledge, language suppression and revitalization, and a hope that maps reframing names from "North America" to "Turtle Island" would help bioregions become frameworks for decolonization, as well as more accurate cultural representation and recognition of Indigenous sovereignty. It also grew from civil rights movement, anti-war movement, anti-nuclear movement, the Diggers, as well as an increasing awareness of pervasive ecological pollution, especially in areas like Los Angeles.

=== Allen Van Newkirk and the Institute for Bioregional Research ===
The term bioregion as it relates to bioregionalism is credited to Allen Van Newkirk, a Canadian poet and biogeographer. In this field, the idea of "bioregion" probably goes back much earlier than published material suggests, being floated in early published small press zines by Newkirk, and in conversational dialogue. He would go on to found the Institute for Bioregional Research and issued a series of short papers using the term bioregion as early as 1970, which would start to circulate the idea of "bioregion". Newkirk met Peter Berg (another early scholar on Bioregionalism) in San Francisco in 1969 and again in Nova Scotia in 1971 where he shared the idea with Berg. Peter Berg, who would go on to found the Planet Drum foundation, and become a leading proponent of "bioregions" learned of the term in 1971 while Judy Goldhaft and Peter Berg were staying with Allen Van Newkirk, before Berg attended the first United Nations Conference on the Human Environment in Stockholm during June 1972. Berg would go on to found the Planet Drum Foundation in 1973, and they published their first Bioregional Bundle in that year, that also included a definition of a bioregion. Helping refine this definition, Author Kirkpatrick Sale wrote in 1974 that "A bioregion is a part of the earth's surface whose rough boundaries are determined by natural rather than human dictates, distinguishable from other areas by attributes of flora, fauna, water, climate, soils and landforms, and human settlements and cultures those attributes give rise to. in 1975 A. Van Newkirk published the first article calling for bioregionalism in a paper entitled "Bioregions: Towards Bioregional Strategy for Human Cultures" in which he advocates for the incorporation of human activity ("occupying populations of the culture-bearing animal") within bioregional definitions.

=== Judy Goldhaft, Peter Berg and the Planet Drum Foundation ===
Starting in 1973, Planet Drum Foundation in San Francisco became a leading institution promoting bioregionalism. They published a series of publications looking at place, poetry, cultural expression, politics, art and many other subjects. From this group, other early bioregional groups started, such as the Frisco Bay Mussel Group, Raise the Stakes newsletters, and Bioregional Bundles that would carry the bioregional movement forward for the next several decades.

This started by creating bioregional "Bundles" that they would publish each year, that would be distinct to a bioregion, and help the people within that place define that bioregion. Each envelope would contain many different pieces of poetry, art, writing, science documents, and place-specific technology booklets, articles, maps, posters, photographs, directories, and calendars. From 1973 to 1985 Planet Drum published nine Bundles, on topics ranging as far as North America, South America, the Arctic Circle, West Africa, Morocco, the Pacific Rim, Japan, and China. From 1979 to 2000, Planet Drum began publishing Raise The Stakes, the Planet Drum Review, a bi-annual international publication which became an important central voice for the bioregional movement, bioregional organizers around North America and world, and for defining the term bioregion among those using it. By 1990, Planet Drum served as node for more than 250 bioregionally oriented groups in North America, including Canada and Mexico, with emerging movements in Australia, Latin America, Italy and Spain.

=== Raymond Dasmann and Reinhabiting California ===
One of the other early proponents of bioregionalism, and who helped define what a bioregion is, was American biologist and environmental scientist Raymond F. Dasmann. Dasmann studied at UC Berkeley under the legendary wildlife biologist Aldo Leopold, and earned his Ph.D. in zoology in 1954. Working with Peter Berg, and also contemporary with Allen Van Newkirk, Dasmann was one of the pioneers in developing the definition for the term "Bioregion", as well as conservation concepts of "Eco-development" and "biological diversity", and identified the crucial importance of recognizing indigenous peoples and their cultures in efforts to conserve natural landscapes. He began his academic career at Humboldt State University, where he was a professor of natural resources from 1954 until 1965. During the 1960s, he worked at the Conservation Foundation in Washington, D.C., as Director of International Programs and was also a consultant on the development of the 1972 Stockholm Conference on the Human Environment. In the 1970s he worked with UNESCO where he initiated the Man and the Biosphere Programme (MAB), an international research and conservation program. During the same period he was Senior Ecologist for the International Union for Conservation of Nature in Switzerland, initiating global conservation programs which earned him the highest honors awarded by The Wildlife Society, and the Smithsonian Institution.

This idea was carried forward and developed by ecologist Raymond Dasmann and Peter Berg in article they co-authored called Reinhabiting California in 1977, which argued that bioregions were more than just biotic provinces and biogeography, and that humans are a critical part of the idea of bioregions. Peter Berg and ecologist Raymond Dasmann said in their 1977 article "Reinhabiting California":

Reinhabitation involves developing a bioregional identity, something most North Americans have lost or have never possessed. We define bioregion in a sense different from the biotic provinces of Raymond Dasmann (1973) or the biogeographical province of Miklos Udvardy. The term refers both to geographical terrain and a terrain of consciousness—to a place and the ideas that have developed about how to live in that place. Within a bioregion, the conditions that influence life are similar, and these, in turn, have influenced human occupancy.

This article defined bioregions as distinct from biogeographical and biotic provinces that ecologists and geographers had been developing by adding a human and cultural lens to the strictly ecological idea.

=== Murray Bookchin and the Institute for Social Ecology ===
This new movement grew strongly also on earlier work from Murray Bookchin, who ran the Institute for Social Ecology, and was deeply involved in influencing and helping define the early bioregional movement. Drawing on earlier traditions beginning with Ecology and Revolutionary Thought in 1964 Bookchin argued for the reorganization of American society based upon a decentralized regional model which would each encompass a single bioregion or ecosystem. His organization, the Institute for Social Ecology worked with the Planet Drum Foundation for the increased implementation of alternative forms of energy, reduction and restriction of carbon dioxide emissions, anti-globalism, and the implementation of a bioregional approach to economic development. For Bookchin, a bioregional approach to economic development accepted one of the basic assertions of Social Ecology that a human community is fundamentally a part of a total ecosystem. Furthermore, Bookchin felt that humans were a part of an earth society:

We might also conceive of this role as an expression of a kind of citizenship—if we think of ourselves not only as citizens of a town, city or neighborhood, but also as citizens of our ecosystem, of our bioregion, of our georegion, and of the earth itself.

— Murray Bookchin, Municipal Dreams: Citizenship and Self-Identity

Peter Berg, writing about his experience helping to write the "Bioregions" issue of Coevolution Quarterly in the late 70's worked with Bookchin' to use his Ecology of Freedom, which Berg claimed to be an "invaluable help to set the autonomous and self-governing tone of bioregional discourse."

=== Bioregional Congresses ===
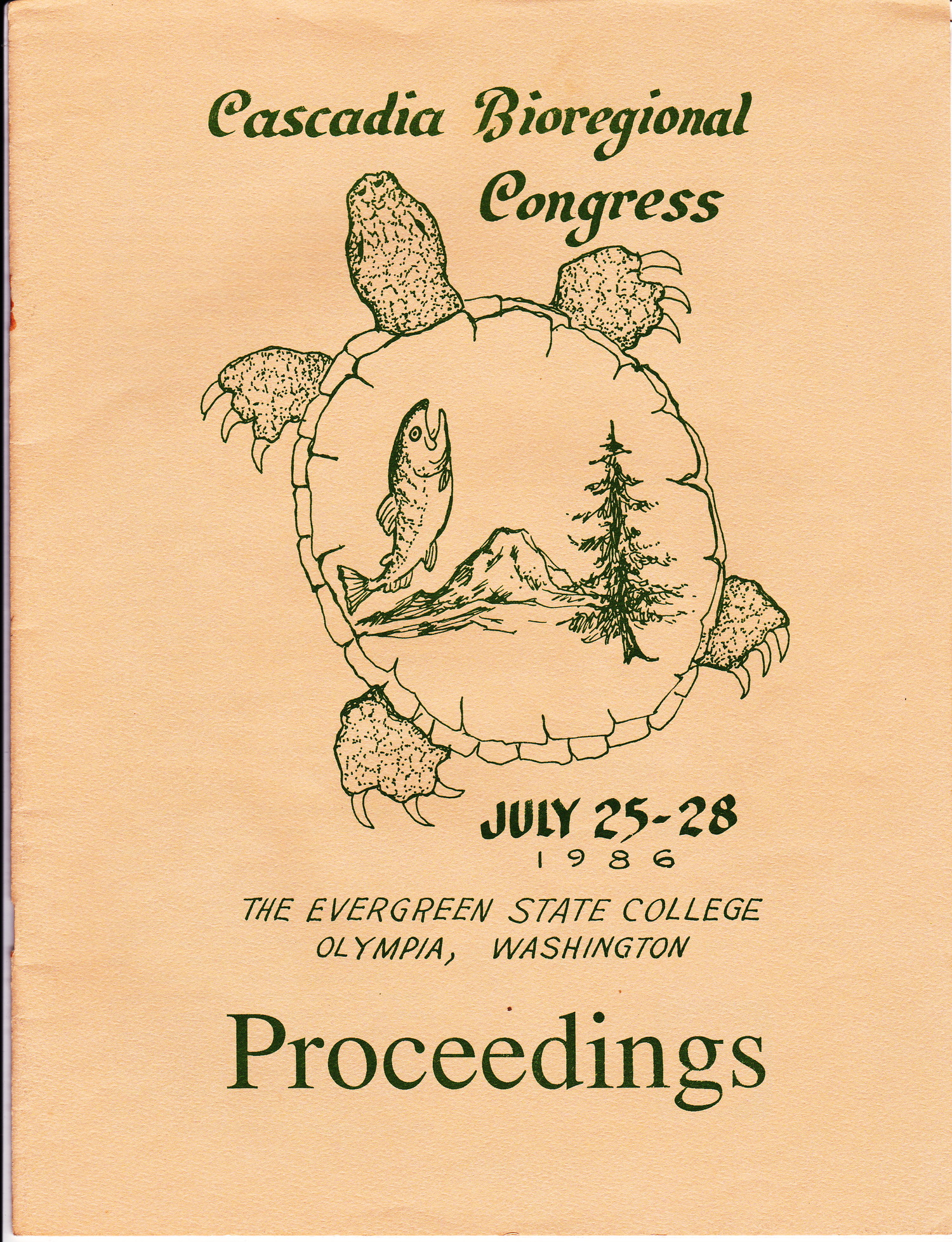
Proceedings from the first Cascadia Bioregional Congress at The Evergreen State College in 1986

A major evolution in how bioregions were defined also occurred alongside this work in the mid-1980s, and can be attributed to David Haenke (b. 1945). Inspired by the call of Peter Berg, who released "Amble towards a Continental Congress" in 1976 for the bicentennial of the United States founding, Haenke conceptualized the Ozark Area Community Congress in 1977, started the Bioregional Project in 1982, launched the Ozarks Bioregional Congress in 1980, and then launched the first ever North American Bioregional Congress (NABC) in 1984.

David Haenke would also go on to be one of the founders of the United States Green Party, which he viewed as a political wing of the bioregional movement.

David Haenke had two questions he asked while defining a bioregion:

In defining a bioregion there are two main questions that you’ll need to ask: What is your effective organizing area? What and where are your resources and potential participants? Bioregional boundaries are never "hard." There is no bioregional map of North America or the world, but the closest base maps are things like World Biogeographical Provinces Map by Miklos Udvardy and Ted Oberlander. But these provinces are huge, containing a number of bioregions that are not yet delineated. Many people use watersheds as ultimate definers, and if your group identifies strongly with a particular watershed, hydrologic survey maps may help you determine borders.

— David Haenke,, Organizing a Bioregional Congress, NABC II, Proceedings 1986.

From 1984 through the 2010s, many regional groups, such as the Great Lakes, Kansas, Cascadia, would hold regional "Bioregional Congresses" for specific bioregions, and then every two years would gather as part of a North American bioregional congress. Cascadia for example held its first Cascadia Bioregional Congress at The Evergreen State College in 1986, an Ish River confluence in 1987, another Bioregional Congress in 1988 at Breitenbush in Oregon, and a third congress in Lillooet in British Columbia in 1989. This was also timed for the third North American Bioregional Congress which took place in Samish in 1988.

=== Bioregional Learning Centers ===
The idea of bioregions, and their uses was again expanded by Donella Meadows, author of The Limits to Growth in 1972, and was the primary premise for her to launch the Balaton Group in 1982. A big part of this for her, was using bioregions as the basis for "bioregional learning centers", each of which would be responsible for a discrete bioregion. In her words, the purpose of a bioregion was to:

Help people and cultures all over the world develop and express their own capacity to solve their own problems, consistent with their own needs and with the ecosystems around them. And doing that through enhancing the power within all cultures and peoples to combine intellectual knowing and intuitive knowing, reasoning about the earth and living in consonance with it, and of a number of centers where information and models about resources and the environment are housed. There would need to be many of these centers, all over the world, each one responsible for a discrete bioregion.

— Donella Meadows, Bioregional Essays: Bioregional Centres - Donella Meadows' Vision for Deep Local Change. Statement to the Belaton Group, 1982

== In politics ==
North American Bioregional Assemblies have been meeting at bi-annual gatherings of bioregionalists throughout North America since 1984 and have given rise to national level Green Parties. The tenets of bioregionalism are often used by green movements, which oppose political organizations whose boundaries conform to existing electoral districts. This problem is perceived to result in elected representatives voting in accordance with their constituents, some of whom may live outside a defined bioregion, and may run counter to the well-being of the bioregion.

At the local level, several bioregions have congresses that meet regularly. For instance, the Ozark Plateau bioregion hosts a yearly Ozark Area Community Congress, better known as OACC, which has been meeting every year since 1980, most often on the first weekend in October. The Kansas Area Watershed (KAW) was founded in 1982 and has been meeting regularly since that time. KAW holds a yearly meeting, usually in the spring.

The government of the Canadian province of Alberta created the "land-use framework regions" in 2007 roughly corresponding to each major river basin within the province. This is supported by local initiatives such as the Beaver Hills Initiative to preserve an ecoregion which encompasses Elk Island National Park and the surrounding area.

== See also ==
- Cascadia (independence movement) – Movement for greater autonomy in the Pacific Northwest
- Distributism – Economic theory promoting local control
- Deep ecology – Ecological and environmental philosophy
- Global Scenario Group – International policy development body
- Ecological footprint – Individual's or a group's human demand on nature
- Élisée Reclus – French geographer, writer and anarchist (1830–1905)
- Geo-fence – Virtual perimeter for a real-world geographic area
- Grassroots democracy – Type that favors individual activism
- Green anarchism – Branch of anarchism focused on the environment
- List of ecoregions
- Localism (politics) – Political philosophy prioritizing local governance and community control
- Permaculture – Approach to agriculture and land management
- Social ecology (Bookchin) – American social theorist (1921–2006)
