= Bioregion =

Ecology terminology

Primary drainage basins in Canada

A bioregion is a geographical area defined not by administrative boundaries, but by distinct characteristics such as plant and animal species, ecological systems, soils and landforms, human settlements, and topographic features such as drainage basins (also referred to as "watersheds"). A bioregion can be on land or at sea. The idea of bioregions was adopted and popularized in the mid-1970s by a school of philosophy called bioregionalism, which includes the concept that human culture can influence bioregional definitions due to its effect on non-cultural factors. Bioregions are part of a nested series of ecological scales, generally starting with local watersheds, growing into larger river systems, then Level III or IV ecoregions (or regional ecosystems), bioregions, then biogeographical realm, followed by the continental-scale and ultimately the biosphere.

Within the life sciences, there are numerous methods used to define the physical limits of a bioregion based on the spatial extent of mapped ecological phenomena—from species distributions and hydrological systems (i.e. Watersheds) to topographic features (e.g. landforms) and climate zones (e.g. Köppen classification). Bioregions also provide an effective framework in the field of Environmental history, which seeks to use "river systems, ecozones, or mountain ranges as the basis for understanding the place of human history within a clearly delineated environmental context". A bioregion can also have a distinct cultural identity defined, for example, by Indigenous Peoples whose historical, mythological and biocultural connections to their lands and waters shape an understanding of place and territorial extent. Within the context of bioregionalism, bioregions can be socially constructed by modern-day communities for the purposes of better understanding a place "with the aim to live in that place sustainably and respectfully."

Bioregions have practical applications in the study of biology, biocultural anthropology, biogeography, biodiversity, bioeconomics, bioregionalism, bioregional mapping, community health, ecology, environmental history, environmental science, foodsheds, geography, natural resource management, urban Ecology, and urban planning. References to the term "bioregion" in scholarly literature have grown exponentially since the introduction of the term—from a single research paper in 1971 to approximately 65,000 journal articles and books published to date. Governments and multilateral institutions have utilized bioregions in mapping Ecosystem Services and tracking progress towards conservation objectives, such as ecosystem representation.

== Background ==
The first confirmed use of the term "bioregion" in academic literature was by E. Jarowski in 1971, a marine biologist studying the blue crab populations of Louisiana. The author used the term sensu stricto to refer to a "biological region"—the area within which a crab can be provided with all the resources needed throughout its entire life cycle. The term was quickly adopted by other biologists, but eventually took on a broader set of definitions to encompass a range of macro-ecological phenomena.

The term bioregion as it relates to bioregionalism is credited to Allen Van Newkirk, a Canadian poet and biogeographer. In this field, the idea of "bioregion" likely goes back much earlier than published material suggests, being floated in early published small press zines by Newkirk, as well as in conversational dialogue. This can be exemplified by the fact that Newkirk had met Peter Berg (another early scholar on bioregionalism) in San Francisco in 1969 and again in Nova Scotia in 1971 where he shared the idea with Berg. He would go on to found the Institute for Bioregional Research and issue a series of short papers using the term bioregion as early as 1970. Peter Berg, who would go on to found the Planet Drum foundation, and become a leading proponent of "bioregions" learned of the term in 1971 while Judy Goldhaft and Peter Berg were staying with Allen Van Newkirk, before Berg attended the first United Nations Conference on the Human Environment in Stockholm during June 1972. The Planet Drum Foundation published their first Bioregional Bundle in that year, that also included a definition of a bioregion. Helping refine this definition, Author Kirkpatrick Sale wrote in 1974 that "a bioregion is a part of the earth's surface whose rough boundaries are determined by natural rather than human dictates, distinguishable from other areas by attributes of flora, fauna, water, climate, soils and landforms, and human settlements and cultures those attributes give rise to."

Several other marine biology papers picked up the term, and in 1974 the International Union for Conservation of Nature (IUCN) published its first global-scale biogeographical map entitled "Biotic Provinces of the World". However, in their 1977 article "Reinhabiting California", director of the IUCN and founder of the Man and Biosphere project Raymond Dasmann and Peter Berg pushed back against these global bodies that were attempting to use the term bioregion in a strictly ecological sense, which separated humans from the ecosystems they lived in, specifically naming that Biotic Provinces of the World Map, was not a map of bioregions.

"Reinhabitation involves developing a bioregional identity, something most North Americans have lost or have never possessed. We define bioregion in a sense different from the biotic provinces of Raymond Dasmann (1973) or the biogeographical province of Miklos Udvardy. The term refers both to geographical terrain and a terrain of consciousness—to a place and the ideas that have developed about how to live in that place. Within a bioregion, the conditions that influence life are similar, and these, in turn, have influenced human occupancy."

This article defined bioregions as distinct from biogeographical and biotic provinces that ecologists and geographers had been developing by adding a human and cultural lens to the strictly ecological idea.

In 1975, A. Van Newkirk published a paper entitled "Bioregions: Towards Bioregional Strategy for Human Cultures" in which he advocates for the incorporation of human activity ("occupying populations of the culture-bearing animal") within bioregional definitions.

=== Etymology ===
Bioregion as a term comes from the Greek bios (life), and the French region (region), itself from the Latin regia (territory) and earlier regere (to rule or govern). Etymologically, bioregion means "life territory" or "place-of-life".

== Bioregionalism ==
Bioregions became a foundational concept within the philosophical system called Bioregionalism. A key difference between ecoregions and biogeography and the term bioregion is that while ecoregions are based on general biophysical and ecosystem data, human settlement and cultural patterns play a key role in how a bioregion is defined. A bioregion is defined along the watershed, and hydrological boundaries, and uses a combination of bioregional layers, beginning with the oldest "hard" lines: geology, topography, tectonics, wind, fracture zones and continental divides, working its way through the "soft" lines: living systems such as soil, ecosystems, climate, marine life, and flora and fauna, and lastly the "human" lines: human geography, energy, transportation, agriculture, food, music, language, history, Indigenous cultures, and ways of living within the context set into a place, and its limits to determine the final edges and boundaries. This is summed up well by David McCloskey, author of the Cascadia Bioregion map: "A bioregion may be analyzed on physical, biological, and cultural levels. First, we map the landforms, geology, climate, and hydrology and how these environmental factors work together to create a common template for life in that particular place. Second, we map flora and fauna, especially the characteristic vegetative communities, and link them to their habitats. Third, we look at native peoples, western settlement, and current land-use patterns and problems, in interaction with the first two levels."

A bioregion is defined as the largest physical boundaries where connections based on that place will make sense. The basic units of a bioregion are watersheds and hydrological basins, and a bioregion will always maintain the natural continuity and full extent of a watershed. While a bioregion may stretch across many watersheds, it will never divide or separate a water basin. As conceived by Van Newkirk, bioregionalism is presented as a technical process of identifying "biogeographically interpreted culture areas called bioregions". Within these territories, resident human populations would "restore plant and animal diversity," "aid in the conservation and restoration of wild eco-systems," and "discover regional models for new and relatively non-arbitrary scales of human activity in relation to the biological realities of the natural landscape". His first published article in a mainstream magazine was in 1975 in his article Bioregions: Towards Bioregional Strategy in Environmental Conservation. In the article, Allen Van Newkirk tentatively defines a bioregion as: "biologically significant areas of the Earth's surface which can be mapped and discussed as distinct existing patterns of plant, animal, and habitat distributions as related to range patterns and… deformations, attributed to one or more successive occupying populations of the culture-bearing animal (aka humans)....Towards this end a group of projects relating to bioregions or themes of applied human biogeography is envisaged.

For Newkirk, the term "bioregion" was a way to combine human culture with earlier work on biotic provinces. So, he called this new field "regional human biogeography" and was the first to use terms such as "bioregional strategies" and "bioregional framework" for adapting human cultures into a place. This idea was carried forward and developed by ecologist Raymond Dasmann and Peter Berg in an article they co-authored called Reinhabiting California in 1977, which rebuked earlier ecologist efforts to only use biotic provinces, and biogeography, which excluded humans from the definition of bioregion.

Peter Berg and Judy Goldhaft founded the Planet Drum Foundation in 1973, located in San Francisco which celebrated its 50th anniversary in 2023. Planet Drum, from their website, defines a bioregion as "a geographical area with coherent and interconnected plant and animal communities, and other natural characteristics (often defined by a watershed) plus the cultural values that humans have developed for living in harmony with these natural systems. Because it is a cultural idea, the description of a specific bioregion uses information from both the natural sciences and other sources. Each bioregion is a whole 'life-place' with unique requirements for human inhabitation so that it will not be disrupted and injured. People are counted as an integral aspect of a place's life."

At a 1991 Symposium on Biodiversity of Northwestern California, Peter Berg stated "A bioregion can be determined initially by the use of climatology, physiography, animal and plant geography, natural history and other descriptive natural sciences. The final boundaries of a bioregion are best described by the people who have lived within it, through human recognition of the realities of living-in-place. All life on the planet is interconnected in a few obvious ways, and in many more that remain barely explored. But there is a distinct resonance among living things and the factors which influence them that occurs specifically within each separate place on the planet. Discovering and describing that resonance is a way to describe a bioregion."

Thomas Berry, an educator, environmentalist, activist, and priest, who authored the United Nations World Charter for Nature, and historian of the Hudson River Valley, was also deeply rooted in the bioregional movement, and helping bioregionalism spread to the east coast of North America. In 1984 he wrote "A bioregion is simply an indenfidable geographic area whose life systems are self-contained, self- sustaining and self renewing. A bioregion, you might say, is a basic unit within the natural system of earth. Another way to define a bioregion is in terms of watersheds. Bioregions must develop human populations that accord with their natural context. The human is not exempt from being part of the basic inventory in a bioregion."

Kirkpatrick Sale another early pioneer of the idea of bioregions, wrote in his book Dwellers in the Land, "A bioregion is a part of the earth's surface whose rough boundaries are determined by natural and human dictates, distinguishable from other areas by attributes of flora, fauna, water, climate, soils and land-forms, and human settlements and cultures those attributes give rise to. The borders between such areas are usually not rigid – nature works with more flexibility and fluidity than that – but the general contours of the regions themselves are not hard to identify, and indeed will probably be felt, understood, sensed or in some way known to many inhabitants, and particularly those still rooted in the land."

One of the other early proponents of bioregionalism, and who helped define what a bioregion is, was American biologist and environmental scientist Raymond F. Dasmann. Dasmann studied at UC Berkeley under the legendary wildlife biologist Aldo Leopold, and earned his Ph.D. in zoology in 1954. He began his academic career at Humboldt State University, where he was a professor of natural resources from 1954 until 1965. During the 1960s, he worked at the Conservation Foundation in Washington, D.C., as Director of International Programs and was also a consultant on the development of the 1972 Stockholm Conference on the Human Environment. In the 1970s he worked with UNESCO where he initiated the Man and the Biosphere Programme(MAB), an international research and conservation program. During the same period he was Senior Ecologist for the International Union for Conservation of Nature in Switzerland, initiating global conservation programs which earned him the highest honors awarded by The Wildlife Society, and the Smithsonian Institution.

Working with Peter Berg, and also contemporary with Allen Van Newkirk, Dasmann was one of the pioneers in developing the definition for the term "Bioregion", as well as conservation concepts of "Eco-development" and "biological diversity," and identified the crucial importance of recognizing indigenous peoples and their cultures in efforts to conserve natural landscapes.

Because it is a cultural idea, the description of a specific bioregion is drawn using information from not only the natural sciences but also many other sources. It is a geographic terrain and a terrain of consciousness. Anthropological studies, historical accounts, social developments, customs, traditions, and arts can all play a part. Bioregionalism utilizes them to accomplish three main goals:

1. restore and maintain local natural systems;
2. practice sustainable ways to satisfy basic human needs such as food, water, shelter, and materials; and
3. support the work of reinhabitation.

The latter is accomplished through proactive projects, employment and education, as well as by engaging in protests against the destruction of natural elements in a life-place.

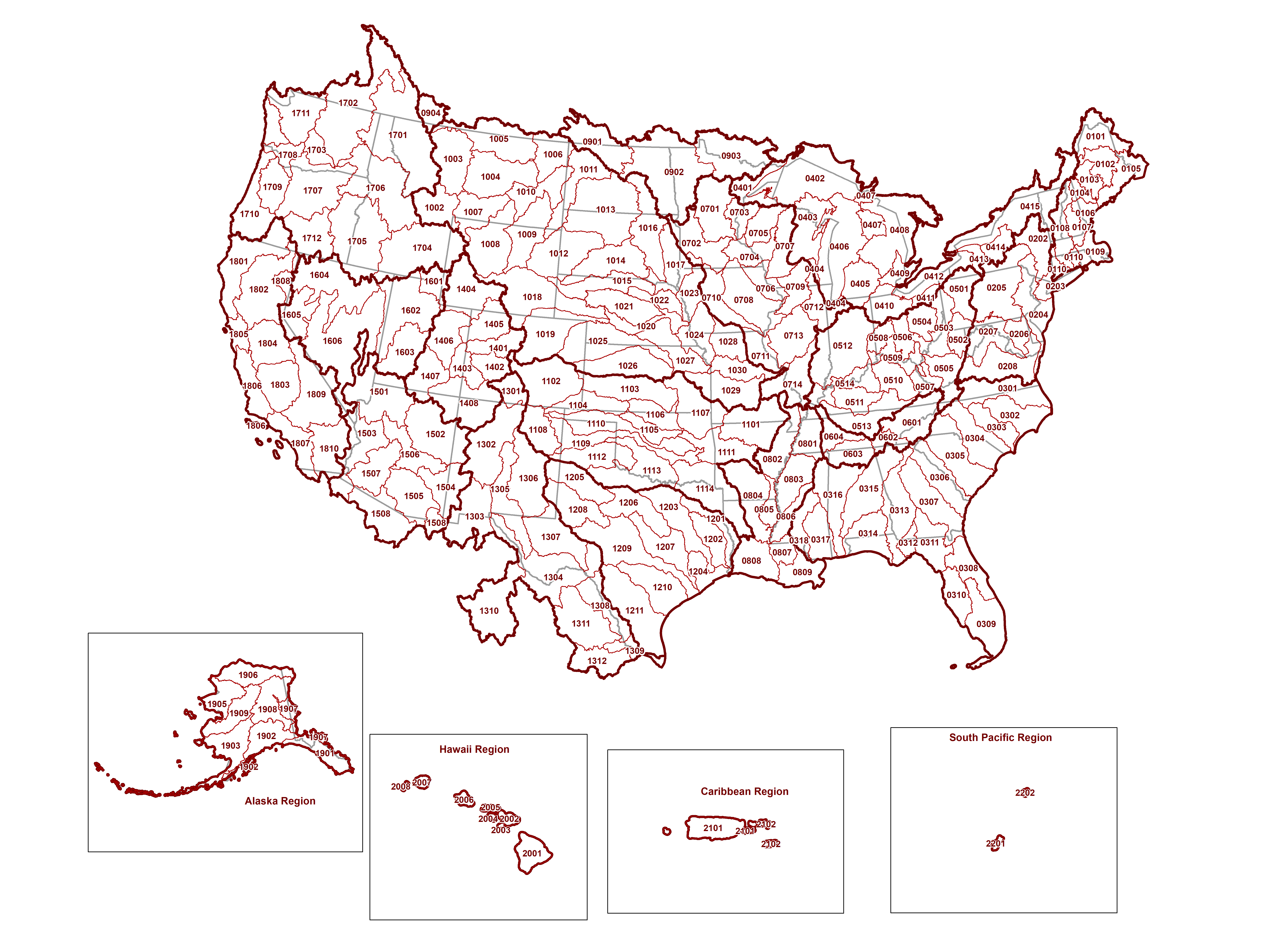

Bioregional goals play out in a spectrum of different ways for different places. In North America, for example, restoring native prairie grasses is a basic ecosystem-rebuilding activity for reinhabitants of the Kansas Area Watershed Bioregion in the Midwest, whereas bringing back salmon runs has a high priority for Shasta Bioregion in northern California. Using geothermal and wind as a renewable energy source fits Cascadia Bioregion in the rainy Pacific Northwest. Less cloudy skies in the Southwest's sparsely vegetated Sonoran Desert Bioregion make direct solar energy a more plentiful alternative there. Education about local natural characteristics and conditions varies diversely from place to place, along with bioregionally significant social and political issues.

== Bioregional mapping ==
An important part of bioregionalism is bioregional mapping. Instructions for how to map a bioregion were first laid out in a book Mapping for Local Empowerment, written by University of British Columbia by Douglas Aberley in 1993, followed by the mapping handbook Giving the Land a Voice in 1994. This grew from the Tsleil-Waututh First Nation, Nisga'a, Tsilhqotʼin, Wetʼsuwetʼen first nations who used Bioregional Mapping to create some of the first bioregional atlases as part of court cases to defend their sovereignty in the 1980s and 1990s, one such example being the Tsilhqotʼin Nation v British Columbia.

In these resources, there are two types of maps: Bioregional Maps and maps of Bioregions, which both include physical, ecological and human lines. A bioregional map can be any scale, and is a community and participatory process to map what people care about. Bioregional maps and atlases can be considered tools and jumping off points for helping guide regenerative activities of a community. Mapping a bioregion is considered a specific type of bioregional map, in which many layers are brought together to map a "whole life place", and is considered an 'optimal zone of interconnection for a species to thrive', i.e. for humans, or a specific species such as salmon, and uses many different layers to see what boundaries "emerge" and make sense as frameworks of stewardship.

A good example of this is the Salmon Nation bioregion, which is the Pacific Northwest and northwest rim of the Pacific Ocean as defined through the historic and current range of the salmon, as well as the people and ecosystem which have evolved over millennia to depend on them. This style of bioregional mapping can also be found in the works of Henry David Thoreau who when hired to make maps by the United States government, chose instead to create maps "that charts and delineates the local ecology and its natural history as well as its intersection with a human community".

This type of mapping is consistent with, and aligns with an indigenous and western worldview.

This is put well by Douglas Aberley and chief Michael George noting that:

"Once the bioregional map atlas is completed it becomes the common foundation of knowledge from which planning scenarios can be prepared, and decisions ultimately made. Complex information that is otherwise difficult to present is clearly depicted. The community learns about itself in the process of making decisions about its future."

Sheila Harrington, in the introduction to Islands of the Salish Sea: A Community Atlas goes one step further, noting that:

"The atlas should be used as a jumping off place for decision making about the future. From the holistic image of place that the maps collectively communicate, what actions could be adopted to achieve sustainable prosperity? What priorities emerge from a survey of damaged lands and unsolved social ills? What underutilized potentials can be put to work to help achieve sustainability? The atlas can become a focus for discussions setting a proactive plan for positive change."

=== Defining a specific bioregion ===
Mapping a bioregion consists of:

1. Choosing and creating a base map and a scale, generally using a hydrological or watershed map. Because bioregional maps are whole systems maps, they can travel across watersheds, but will not divide them.
2. Survey and decide what needs to be mapped in this area. What are the physical and ecological communities in that place that need to be included? This can include watershed information, animal communities, vegetation types, and physiographic (landform) regions.
3. In addition to the above, "it is necessary to make human occupation of any land area a part of the bioregion definition equation. [By so doing] this approach captures the essence of the bioregional ideal: to irrevocably human activity into processes of sustainable land, plant, and atmospheric interaction"
4. Include time. From points 2 and 3, how has this information changed from glacial times (or before) to the present? in this way, we map not only the present interactions between humans, ecosystems, physical landforms and water cycles, but also can map such changes over a long period of time.
5. Examine the extent of what it is that you would like to map. Is the area big enough? Small enough? Does the area consist of a whole system? Is this space large enough to support the inhabitant populations and nutrient cycling?
6. Outline the different extents and boundaries you are including, and layer them together to see what "emerges".

Your final map will generally help demarcate a bioregion, or life place.

== Methodology and classification ==
While references to bioregions (or biogeographical regions) have become increasingly common in scholarly literature related to life sciences, "there is little agreement on how to best classify and name such regions, with several conceptually related terms being used, often interchangeably." Bioregions can take many forms and operate at many scales – from very small ecosystems or 'biotopes' to ecoregions (which can be nested at different scales) to continent-scale distributions of plants and animals, like biomes or realms. All of them, technically, can be considered types of bioregions sensu lato and are often referred to as such in academic literature.

In 2014, J. Morrone documented a history of 13 biogeographical concepts in "On Biotas and their names". A recent review of scholarly literature finds 20 unique biotic methods to define bioregions—based on populations of specific plant and animal species or species assemblages. These range from global and continental scales to sub-continental and regional scales to sub-regional and local scales.

Biotic Methods			
Bioregion Type	Bioregion Definition	Examples	Approx. Scale
domain	A biogeographical domain is a macroecological region spanning a continent or group of continents or major bioclimatic regions, which can be used to study the dispersal of particular species.	"isoclimatic Mediterranean"	continental or global
realm	In biogeography, realms most often refer to the broadest classification of Earth's land surface, based on distributional patterns of terrestrial organisms in eight major divisions. Within the IUCN Ecosystem Typology, Level 1 "realms" refer to 5 major divisions of the biosphere—Terrestrial, Subterranean, Freshwater, Marine, Atmospheric.	"terrestrial" or "Nearctic"	continental or global
biome	A standardized typology for large-scale areas characterized by vegetation, soil, climate, and wildlife in 14 major categories per Dinerstein et al. Within the IUCN Ecosystem Typology, Level 2 "biomes" are reduced to 7 "core" terrestrial types, including an anthropogenic land-use type, and several additional "transitional" biome types.	"temperate grasslands and savannas"	sub-continental
functional group	A hierarchical classification system that, in its upper levels, defines ecosystems by their convergent ecological functions (biomes) and, in its lower levels, distinguishes ecosystems with contrasting assemblages of species engaged in those functions. Within the IUCN Ecosystem Typology these are Level 3 "functional groups".	"trophic savannas"	sub-continental
ecozone	A division of the Earth's land surface distinguished by the evolutionary histories and distribution patterns of its life forms. Ecozones can refer both to biome-scale divisions (per J. Schulz) or continent-scale divisions (per Cox et al.).	"Great Plains" (i.e. 9 per EPA)	sub-continental (EPA Level I ecoregion) or continental
province/ecoprovince or biotic province	Specific biogeographical areas on land and sea delineated by common landforms and ecological conditions.	"S. Central Semi-arid Prairies" (terrestrial, 9.4 per EPA), "Louisianan province" (marine)	regional (EPA Level II ecoregion)
ecoregion	Areas which harbor ecosystems generally similar in character as defined by prevalent flora and fauna across both terrestrial and marine domains. Within the IUCN Ecosystem Typology these are comparable to Level 4 "regional subgroups".	"Cross Timbers savanna-woodland" (i.e. terrestrial ID 390 per Dinerstein et al.), "N. Gulf of Mexico" (i.e. marine ID 43 per Spalding et al.)	sub-regional (EPA Level III ecoregion)
ecosystem	A specific community of interacting organisms and the interactions of biotic and abiotic components in a given area, generally defined at smaller scales.	"Northern Cross Timbers" (i.e. 29a per EPA)	local (EPA Level IV ecoregion)
ecotone, ecoline	A transition area between two biological communities where two communities meet and integrate.	"Thames estuary"	sub-regional or local
zoogeographic region; phytogeographic region	Areas with relatively uniform conditions defining distinct animal population ranges; areas with relatively uniform climatic conditions defining distinct plant populations.	"lion range"; "floristic kingdom"	sub-continental or regional
chorotype	The delineation of groups of species that have coincident ranges (there are two differing uses of the term in biogeography).	"holarctic chorotype"	sub-continental or regional
area of endemism (AoE)	A single defined geographic location that is the only place where a particular species (or several species) can be found (e.g. islands).	"Austral Patagonia"	sub-continental or regional
concrete biota	All the flora and fauna species encountered in all habitats within an area surrounding a particular locality; the lowest (most elementary) level of floral/faunal organization of the biota.	"concrete flora" or "concrete fauna"	local or sub-regional
nuclear area or centre of endemism	A specific geographic area from which species originate and disperse.	"The Yucutan centre"	sub-continental or regional
phytocorion or floristic province	A specific geographic area possessing a large number of distinct plant taxa.	"Zambezian phytocorion"	sub-continental or regional
chronofauna; horofauna	A geographically restricted natural assemblage of interacting animal populations maintained over a geologically significant period of time; an assemblage of the animal groups that coexist and diversify in a given area over a prolonged time, representing a lasting biogeographic unit.	"Permian vertebrate chronofauna"	sub-continental or regional
cenocron	A given area in which an animal or plant group or community has entered, wherever its origin, within a defined period of geological time, used in cladistic biogeography.	"Mexican Plateau cenocron"	continental or sub-continental
generalized track	A graph of geographic distribution that connects the different localities or distribution areas of a particular taxon or group of taxa (L. Croizat).	"ratite birds track"	global or continental
species assemblage	A group of organisms belonging to a number of different species that co-occur regionally and interact through trophic and spatial relationships. Related terms include biogeographical assemblage and taxonomic assemblage.	"Terai Arc Landscape"	sub-continental or regional
biotope/ecotope or habitat	The natural environment or "home" in which an organism or population normally lives through a significant portion of its life cycle.	"European butterfly biotope"	sub-regional or local

In addition, 5 abiotic methods have been utilized to inform the delineation of biogeographical extents.

Abiotic Methods			
Delineation Type	Method	Examples	Approx. Scale
climate zone	Climatological: maps of land divided based on patterns of seasonal precipitation, humidity, and temperature (Köppen climate classifications, Hardiness Zones, etc.)	"Hardiness zone (e.g. 7a, 7b, 7c)"	continental or sub-continental
landform	Topographical: maps of the forms and features of land surfaces creating natural boundaries across distance and elevation (e.g. mountains, ravines, basins, plateaus, etc.)	"Tibetan Plateau"	sub-continental or regional
soil zone	Pedological: maps of soil types by major classifications including soil texture (e.g. sandy, clay, etc.)	"Histosol region"	sub-continental or regional
watershed	Hydrological: maps of drainage basins or 'watersheds' where all flowing surface water converges to a single point, such as a spring or lake, or flows into another body of water.	"Hudson Valley"	sub-continental or regional
cultural area or cultural region	Anthropological: tribal domains or territories based on historical and cultural knowledge of Indigenous Peoples and local communities.	"Zuni Nation"	regional or sub-regional

== Ecoregions ==
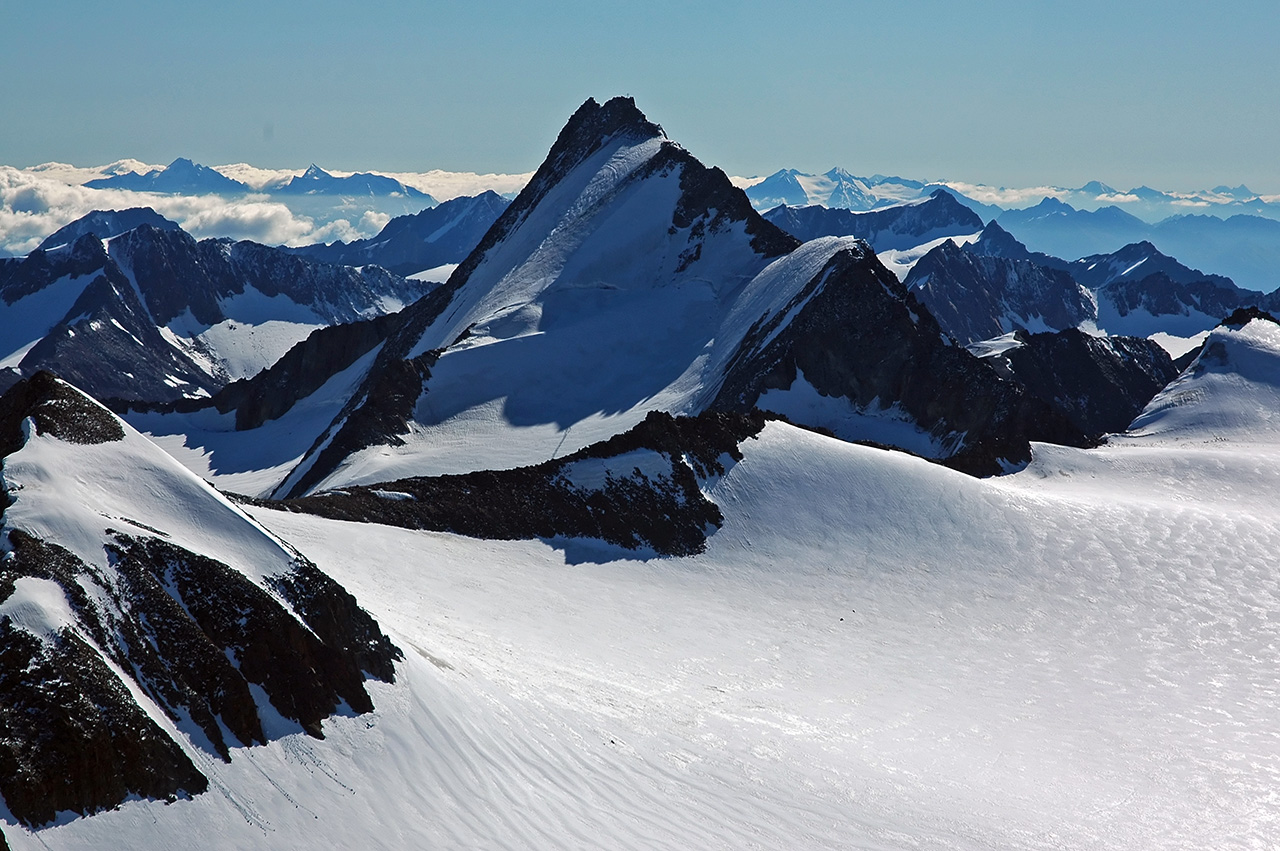
The Ötztal Alps, a mountain range in the central Alps of Europe, are part of the Central Eastern Alps, and can both be termed as ecoregions.

Ecoregions are one of the primary building blocks of bioregions, which are made up of "clusters of biotically related ecoregions".

An Ecoregion (ecological region) is an ecologically and geographically defined area that is smaller than a bioregion, which in turn is smaller than a biogeographic realm. Ecoregions cover relatively large areas of land or water, and contain characteristic, geographically distinct assemblages of natural communities and species. They can include geology physiography, vegetation, climate, hydrology, terrestrial and aquatic fanua, and soils, and may or may not include the impacts of human activity (e.g. land use patterns, vegetation changes etc.). The biodiversity of flora, fauna and ecosystems that characterize an ecoregion tends to be distinct from that of other ecoregions.

The phrase "ecological region" was widely used throughout the 20th century by biologists and zoologists to define specific geographic areas in research. In the early 1970s the term 'ecoregion' was introduced (short for ecological region), and R.G. Bailey published the first comprehensive map of U.S. ecoregions in 1976. The term was used widely in scholarly literature in the 1980s and 1990s, and in 2001 scientists at the U.S. conservation organization World Wildlife Fund (WWF) codified and published the first global-scale map of Terrestrial Ecoregions of the World (TEOW), led by D. Olsen, E. Dinerstein, E. Wikramanayake, and N. Burgess. While the two approaches are related, the Bailey ecoregions (nested in four levels) give more importance to ecological criteria and climate zones, while the WWF ecoregions give more importance to biogeography, that is, the distribution of distinct species assemblages.

Ecoregions can change gradually, and have soft transition areas known as ecotones. Because of this, there can be some variation in how ecoregions are defined. The US Environmental Protection Agency has four ranking systems they use, which lists there being 12 type one ecoregions, and 187 type III ecoregions in North America while another study on the Biodiversity of the Klamath-Siskiyou Ecoregion, researchers found that North America contains 116 ecoregions nested within 10 major habitat types.

The TEOW framework originally delineated 867 terrestrial ecoregions nested into 14 major biomes, contained with the world's 8 major biogeographical realms. Subsequent regional papers by the co-authors covering Africa, Indo-Pacific, and Latin America differentiate between ecoregions and bioregions, referring to the latter as "geographic clusters of ecoregions that may span several habitat types, but have strong biogeographic affinities, particularly at taxonomic levels higher than the species level (genus, family)". In 2007, a comparable set of Marine Ecoregions of the World (MEOW) was published, led by M. Spalding, and in 2008 a set of Freshwater Ecoregions of the World (FEOW) was published, led by R. Abell.

In 2017, an updated version of the terrestrial ecoregions dataset was released in the paper "An Ecoregion-Based Approach to Protecting Half the Terrestrial Realm" led by E. Dinerstein with 48 co-authors. Using recent advances in satellite imagery the ecoregion perimeters were refined and the total number reduced to 846 (and later 844), which can be explored on a web application developed by Resolve and Google Earth Engine. For conservation practitioners and organizations monitoring progress towards the goals of the United Nations Convention on Biological Diversity (CBD), in particular the goal of ecosystem representation in Protected Area networks, the most widely used bioregional delineations include the Resolve Ecoregions and the IUCN Global Ecosystem Typology.

In bioregionalism, an ecoregion can also use geography, ecology, and culture as part of its definition.

== See also ==
- Ecological classification
- Ecology terminology
- Interim Biogeographic Regionalisation for Australia
- Cascadia (bioregion)–a sample bioregion
