= List of shipwrecks in February 1858 =

The list of shipwrecks in February 1858 includes ships sunk, foundered, wrecked, grounded, or otherwise lost during February 1858.

== 1 February ==
List of shipwrecks: 1 February 1858
| Ship | State | Description |
|---|---|---|
| Albert Scheringa | Netherlands | The schooner was driven ashore at Gibraltar. Her crew were rescued. She was on a voyage from Livorno, Grand Duchy of Tuscany to Hamburg. |
| Australia | Kingdom of the Two Sicilies | The barque was wrecked near the mouth of the Na'aman River. She was on a voyage from Acre, Ottoman Syria to an English port. |
| Brothers | United Kingdom | The brig ran aground on the Shingle Sand. She was refloated but consequently sank in the Prince's Channel. |
| Cæsar | Spain | The brig was wrecked on Greca Island, off Algeciras with the loss of six of her eleven crew. |
| Carolina | Russia | The brig was driven ashore at Gibraltar. |
| Eleanor | United Kingdom | The ship was wrecked at Whitby, Yorkshire. Her crew were rescued. She was on a voyage from Sunderland, County Durham to "Wrexhill". |
| Hannah | United Kingdom | The brig ran aground on the Margate Sand, off the coast of Kent. She was on a voyage from Rochester, Kent to Newhaven, Sussex. She was refloated and taken in to Ramsgate, Kent. |
| Hope | United Kingdom | The brig was driven ashore and wrecked at Latakia, Ottoman Syria. Her crew were rescued. |
| Ida | Sweden | The brigantine was driven ashore at Gibraltar. |
| Jeune Joseph | France | The brig was driven ashore at Gibraltar. |
| Sarah | United Kingdom | The brig sank in the Prince's Channel, off the north Kent coast. |
| Theodore | United Kingdom | The ship was driven ashore and sank in the Dimzeven Loch, Isle of Skye. She was on a voyage from Liverpool, Lancashire to Montrose, Forfarshire. |
| Virginie | France | The schooner was driven ashore at Campbeltown, Argyllshire, United Kingdom. She was on a voyage from Glasgow, Renfrewshire, United Kingdom to Rouen, Seine-Inférieure. She was refloated and found to be severely leaky. |
| Wave | United Kingdom | The sloop was driven ashore at Heacham, Norfolk. She was on a voyage from Hull, Yorkshire to Burnham Overy Staithe, Norfolk. |
| William Barker | United Kingdom | The brig was driven ashore and wrecked at Whitby. Her crew were rescued by rocket apparatus and bosun's chair. |

== 2 February ==
List of shipwrecks: 2 February 1858
| Ship | State | Description |
|---|---|---|
| Alexandria | United States | The schooner sailed from Newfoundland for New York on the 2nd and vanished. Lost with all 6 hands. |
| Balmarina | United Kingdom | The ship ran aground at Bowling, Dunbartonshire. She was on a voyage from Bowling to Santander, Spain. She was refloated and taken in to Greenock, Renfrewshire in a leaky condition. |
| Edward Moore | United Kingdom | The ship was driven ashore between Maryport and Workington, Cumberland. She was on a voyage from Liverpool, Lancashire to Annan, Dumfriesshire. She was refloated. |
| Jessie | United Kingdom | The brigantine was driven ashore north and wrecked of Burghead, Aberdeenshire. She was on a voyage from Newcastle upon Tyne, Northumberland to Inverness. |
| Nea Tihi | Greece | The ship was wrecked at Sykia. She was on a voyage from Karaağaç, Ottoman Empire to London, United Kingdom. |

== 3 February ==
List of shipwrecks: 3 February 1858
| Ship | State | Description |
|---|---|---|
| HMS Alacrity | Royal Navy | The screw sloop ran aground in the Princess Channel. She was refloated with the assistance of nine smacks, the ship Dolphin and the tugs Adur, Ranger and Wonder (all United Kingdom) and taken in to Sheerness, Kent. |
| Hope | United Kingdom | The ship departed from Eyemouth, Berwickshire for Seaham, County Durham. Presumed subsequently foundered with the loss of all four crew; a boat washed up at Newburgh, Fife. |
| Louisa | Prussia | The ship was wrecked at Stavanger, Norway. She was on a voyage from Königsberg to Dundee, Forfarshire, United Kingdom. She was towed in to Stavanger on 8 February waterlogged and floating on her cargo. |
| Marseillais | France | The brig was wrecked near Gallipoli, Ottoman Empire. |
| Spring Rice | United Kingdom | The ship ran aground on the Dunkirk Banks, in the English Channel off the coast of Nord, France. She was on a voyage from Hull, Yorkshire to Antwerp, Belgium. She was refloated and put in to Ostend, West Flanders, Belgium in a leaky condition. |

== 4 February ==
List of shipwrecks: 4 February 1858
| Ship | State | Description |
|---|---|---|
| East Anglian | United Kingdom | The steamship ran aground and sank on the Swinebottoms, in the Baltic Sea. She was on a voyage from Hull, Yorkshire to Helsinki, Grand Duchy of Finland. She was refloated on 13 February and taken in to Malmö, Sweden. East Anglian was repaired and returned to service. |
| Friendship | United Kingdom | The ship foundered at the mouth of the River Duddon. She was on a voyage from Ardrossan, Ayrshire to Liverpool, Lancashire. |
| Margaret Pryde | United Kingdom | The ship ran aground on the Cork Sand, in the North Sea off the coast of Essex. She was on a voyage from Hartlepool, County Durham to Rouen, Seine-Inférieure, France. She was refloated and put in to Margate, Kent in a leaky condition. |
| Ocean | United Kingdom | The ship was driven ashore at Barry, Glamorgan, United Kingdom. She was on a voyage from Swansea, Glamorgan to Nantes, Loire-Inférieure. |
| Ocean's Queen | United Kingdom | The ship ran aground on the Thurslett Spit, off the coast of Essex. |
| Pearl | United Kingdom | The ship was driven ashore at Woodside, Cheshire. She was on a voyage from Ardrossan, Ayrshire to Newport, Monmouthshire. |
| Prince Frederick William | United Kingdom | The steamship was damaged whilst assisting the refloating of HMS Alacrity (Royal Navy) and was beached at Kingsdown, Kent. She was refloated and towed in to Ramsgate, Kent. |
| St. Etienne | France | The ship was driven ashore at Barry. She was on a voyage from Swansea to Rochefort, Charente-Inférieure. |

== 5 February ==
List of shipwrecks: 5 February 1858
| Ship | State | Description |
|---|---|---|
| Caroline | United Kingdom | The ship ran aground at Dartmouth, Devon. |
| Mary | United Kingdom | The brig was driven ashore at "Goatziavallos Head". She was later refloated and taken in to New Orleans, Louisiana, United States for repairs. |
| Mary Jane | United Kingdom | The schooner ran aground and sank on Taylor's Bank, in Liverpool Bay. Her crew were rescued. She was on a voyage from Padstow, Cornwall to Liverpool, Lancashire. |
| Red Rover | United States | The ship was driven ashore in the River Thames. She was then run into and severely damaged by a steamship. She was on a voyage from Iquique, Chile to London, United Kingdom. |

== 6 February ==
List of shipwrecks: 6 February 1858
| Ship | State | Description |
|---|---|---|
| Leonie | France | The lugger was run ashore at Blyth, Northumberland, United Kingdom. She was on a voyage from Havre de Grâce, Seine-Inférieure to Blyth. She was refloated on 13 February and taken in to Blyth. |
| Ottoman | Danzig | The steamship was wrecked on Hirsholmene, Denmark. She was on a voyage from Hull, Yorkshire, United Kingdom to Danzig. |
| Weardale | United Kingdom | The brig ran aground on the Cromer Bank, in the North Sea off the coast of Norfolk. She was on a voyage from Sunderland, County Durham to London. She was refloated with the assistance of Laura and Pet (both United Kingdom) and taken in to Great Yarmouth, Norfolk in a severely leaky condition. |

== 7 February ==
List of shipwrecks: 7 February 1858
| Ship | State | Description |
|---|---|---|
| Concord | United Kingdom | The ship was driven ashore at Middleton County Durham. She was on a voyage from Sunderland, County Durham to Cowes, Isle of Wight. She was refloated and towed in to Hartlepool, County Durham in a severely damaged condition. |
| Iron Ark | United Kingdom | The flat sprang a leak and sank off Portishead, Somerset. Her three crew were rescued by the steamship Monkey (United Kingdom). |
| Nysina Gepka | Netherlands | The galiot ran aground on the Kentish Knock. She was on a voyage from Newcastle upon Tyne, Northumberland, United Kingdom to Naples, Kingdom of the Two Sicilies. She was refloated and taken in to Margate, Kent, United Kingdom. |
| Rose | United Kingdom | The ship foundered in the Irish Sea. Her crew were rescued. |
| Tiber | United Kingdom | The ship ran aground at Newport, Monmouthshire. She was refloated on 12 February. |

== 8 February ==
List of shipwrecks: 8 February 1858
| Ship | State | Description |
|---|---|---|
| Catherine and Isabella | United Kingdom | The ship was driven ashore and wrecked at Youghal, County Cork. She was on a voyage from Cardiff, Glamorgan to New Ross, County Wexford. |
| Coringa | United Kingdom | The barque was wrecked on Othonoi, United States of the Ionian Islands. She was on a voyage from Pernambuco, Brazil to Trieste. |
| Galatea | Norway | The barque was wrecked at Youghal. Her fourteen crew were rescued by the Youghal Lifeboat. She was on a voyage from Callao, Peru to Cowes, Isle of Wight, United Kingdom. |
| Pet | United Kingdom | The brigantine was run into by a French lugger and sank in the Bristol Channel between Lundy Island, Devon and Padstow, Cornwall. Her crew were rescued. She was on a voyage from Nieuwpoort, West Flanders, Belgium to Bristol, Gloucestershire. |
| Riversmith | United States | The ship ran aground on the Pacific Reef, 9 nautical miles (17 km) north of the Carysfort Reef Lighthouse, Florida and was wrecked. She was on a voyage from Liverpool, Lancashire, United Kingdom to New Orleans, Louisiana. |

== 9 February ==
List of shipwrecks: 9 February 1858
| Ship | State | Description |
|---|---|---|
| Ann | United Kingdom | The ship was driven ashore at the Mumbles, Glamorgan. |
| Cymbeline | United Kingdom | The brigantine ran aground at Crookhaven, County Cork. She was on a voyage from Crookhaven to Newfoundland, British North America. She was refloated. |
| Deux Marie | France | The ship collided with the schooner Esther and Marie (France in the Bristol Channel and was abandoned by her crew. They were rescued by Jean Baptiste Marie (France). Deux Marie was on a voyage from Honfleur, Manche to Cardiff, Glamorgan. |
| Jessie | United Kingdom | The brig sank off Queenstown, County Cork. Her crew survived. |
| Topaze | France | The schooner was wrecked on the Pen Towyn Sands, in Carmarthen Bay. Her eight crew were rescued. |

== 10 February ==
List of shipwrecks: 10 February 1858
| Ship | State | Description |
|---|---|---|
| Advance | United Kingdom | The ship foundered in the North Sea 3 nautical miles (5.6 km) off Whitby, Yorkshire. She was on a voyage from North Shields, County Durham to London. |
| Cheval de Troye | France | The schooner was driven ashore at Bray, County Wicklow, United Kingdom. She was on a voyage from Nantes, Loire-Inférieure to Newry, County Antrim, United Kingdom. |
| Guigethera | France | The lugger was abandoned off the "Milford Islands". Her crew were rescued by Spankaway (United Kingdom). Guigethera was on a voyage from Nantes, Loire-Inférieure to Llanelly, Glamorgan, United Kingdom. |
| Hope | United Kingdom | The smack was driven ashore near Gamman Head, Devon. |
| Lillydale | United Kingdom | The ship was beached at Castletownshend, County Cork. She was on a voyage from Moulmein, Burma to Queenstown, County Cork. |
| Matilda | United Kingdom | The ship sank at St. Ives, Cornwall. She was on a voyage from Newport, Monmouthshire to Southampton, Hampshire. Subsequently refloated, repaired and returned to service. |
| William and Mary | United Kingdom | The sloop was destroyed by fire at Penarth, Glamorgan. She was on a voyage from Bristol, Gloucestershire to Cardiff, Glamorgan. |

== 11 February ==
List of shipwrecks: 11 February 1858
| Ship | State | Description |
|---|---|---|
| Anne | United Kingdom | The brig was driven ashore at Youghal, County Cork. She was on a voyage from Cardiff, Glamorgan to Youghak. |
| Aspasia | Greece | The brig foundered off "Mount Juick", Spain. |
| Betty | United Kingdom | The ship was driven ashore and wrecked at St. John's Point, County Antrim. Her crew were rescued. She was on a voyage from Liverpool, Lancashire to Dublin. She was refloated on 18 February and taken in to Killough, County Down in a severely damaged condition. |
| Billow | United Kingdom | The schooner was driven ashore in Runswick Bay. Her crew were rescued. She was on a voyage from Sunderland, County Durham to Lowestoft, Suffolk. |
| Colony | United Kingdom | The schooner was abandoned off the coast of Berwickshire. One man was drowned when a coble capsized whilst going to her assistance. She was on a voyage from South Shields, County Durham to Whitstable, Kent. She was subsequently towed in to Berwick upon Tweed, Northumberland. |
| Friend's Goodwill | United Kingdom | The ship was abandoned off the coast of Yorkshire. Her crew were rescued. She was on a voyage from South Shields to London. She was boarded the next day by the crews of two cobles and towed in to Whitby by the tug Esk (United Kingdom) |
| Leander | United States | The barque was in collision with the steamship North American (United Kingdom) and foundered in the Irish Sea between Bardsey Island, Pembrokeshire, United Kingdom and the Tuskar Rock with the loss of ten of the 22 people on board. She was on a voyage from Liverpool to New Orleans, Louisiana. |
| No. 11 | United Kingdom | The dredger, a steamship sprang a leak and sank in the Irish Sea off Holyhead, Anglesey. She was being towed from Liverpool to Wexford. She was refloated on 16 February with the assistance of the tugs Albert and Blazer (both United Kingdom). |
| Penelope | United Kingdom | The brig was driven ashore at Lindisfarne, Northumberland. She was on a voyage from South Shields to London. She was refloated on 13 February. |
| Sisters | (United Kingdom of Great Britain and Ireland) British North America | The brig ran aground at Halifax, Nova Scotia. She was refloated. |

== 12 February ==
List of shipwrecks: 12 February 1858
| Ship | State | Description |
|---|---|---|
| Agamemnon | United Kingdom | The ship was wrecked near the Carysfort Reef Lighthouse. She was on a voyage from New Orleans, Louisiana, United States to Liverpool, Lancashire. |
| Driver | United Kingdom | The ship departed from Liverpool, Lancashire for New York, United States. No further trace, presumed foundered with the loss of all hands. |
| Lillydale | United Kingdom | The ship sprang a leak off Castletownshend, County Cork and was beached there. She was on a voyage from Moulmein, Burma to Liverpool. |
| Penelope | United Kingdom | The brig ran aground at Lindisfarne, Northumberland. |

== 13 February ==
List of shipwrecks: 13 February 1858
| Ship | State | Description |
|---|---|---|
| Elizabeth | France | The whaling barque was wrecked on a submerged reef some 3 miles (4.8 km) off the northeastern shore of Chatham Island, New Zealand. The crew were saved with the help of the United States whaler Seine, but the Elizabeth was a total wreck. |
| James Watt | United Kingdom | The barque ran aground on the Goodwin Sands, Kent. She was on a voyage from Sunderland, County Durham to Genoa, Kingdom of Sardinia. James Watt was later refloated with the assistance of the luggers Charlotte Ann, Morning Star and Stag (all United Kingdom) and taken in to Sheerness, Kent. |

== 14 February ==
List of shipwrecks: 14 February 1858
| Ship | State | Description |
|---|---|---|
| Coquette | United Kingdom | The brigantine was driven ashore at "Trefontaine", Sicily. She was on a voyage from Brăila, Ottoman Empire to an English port. |
| Ida | United Kingdom | The ship caught fire at Colombo, Ceylon. |
| John and James | United Kingdom | The ship sank in the English Channel off Cap Gris-Nez, Pas-de-Calais, France. Her crew were rescued. She was on a voyage from Hartlepool, County Durham to Boulogne, Pas-de-Calais. |
| Medlai | United Kingdom | The steamship was damaged by fire at Leith, Lothian. |

== 15 February ==
List of shipwrecks: 15 February 1858
| Ship | State | Description |
|---|---|---|
| Cygnet | United Kingdom | The ship was driven ashore and wrecked at "Trefontaine", Sicily. She was on a voyage from Brăila, Ottoman Empire to Falmouth, Cornwall or Queenstown, County Cork. |
| Flora | United Kingdom | The ship was wrecked north west of Stepper Point, Cornwall. She was on a voyage from Liverpool, Lancashire to Padstow, Cornwall. |
| Mary Arabay | United Kingdom | The ship was driven ashore at Messina, Sicily. |
| Richmond | United Kingdom | The brig was wrecked on the Haisborough Sands, in the North Sea off the coast of Norfolk. Her crew were rescued by the brig Pytho (United Kingdom). |

== 16 February ==
List of shipwrecks: 16 February 1858
| Ship | State | Description |
|---|---|---|
| City of Paris | United Kingdom | The steamship ran aground in the River Suir 3 nautical miles (5.6 km) downstream of Waterford. She was on a voyage from Milford Haven, Pembrokeshire to Waterford. |
| Colonist | United Kingdom | The ship ran aground on the Longsand, in the North Sea off the coast of Essex. She was on a voyage from Hartlepool, County Durham to Constantinople, Ottoman Empire. She was refloated and taken in to Ramsgate, Kent in a leaky condition. |
| St. Clement | France | The brig foundered in the Atlantic Ocean (49°44′N 5°42′W. Her crew were rescued by Der Wegner (Prussia). |
| Titan | United States | The full-rigged ship was abandoned in the South Atlantic (approx 29°30′S 27°30′W). Her crew were rescued by a French ship. She was on a voyage from Callao, Peru to Cork, United Kingdom. |

== 17 February ==
List of shipwrecks: 17 February 1858
| Ship | State | Description |
|---|---|---|
| Ava | United Kingdom | The steamship was wrecked on a reef off Pigeon Island, Ceylon. All on board, more than 130 people, were rescued. She was on a voyage from Calcutta, India to Suez, Egypt. |
| Pollock | United States | The ship ran aground at Charleston, South Carolina. She was on a voyage from Charleston to Liverpool, Lancashire, United Kingdom. She was refloated and resumed her voyage. |
| Sylvan | France | The schooner foundered off Penzance, Cornwall, United Kingdom. She was on a voyage from Cardiff, Glamorgan, United Kingdom to Rouen, Seine-Inférieure. |
| Thomas Wilson | United Kingdom | The Mersey Ferry collided with the Seacombe Ferry Prince (United Kingdom) in the River Mersey. She was taken in to George's Basin, Liverpool where her passengers were disembarked before she sank. |

== 18 February ==
List of shipwrecks: 18 February 1858
| Ship | State | Description |
|---|---|---|
| Albatros | United Kingdom | The ship departed from Liverpool, Lancashire for Singapore, Straits Settlements. No further trace, presumed foundered with the loss of all hands. |
| Drydens | United Kingdom | The ship ran aground on the Black Middens, in the North Sea off the coast of County Durham. She was on a voyage from South Shields, County Durham to Constantinople, Ottoman Empire. She was refloated on 25 February and taken in to North Shields. |
| HMS Sappho | Royal Navy | The 16-gun brig-sloop was sighted off Cape Bridgewater, Victoria, Australia. No further trace, presumed foundered in the Bass Strait with the loss of all hands. |
| Sir William Wallace | United Kingdom | The tug was driven ashore and wrecked at Aberdeen with the loss of one of her three crew. |
| Diamond State | United States | The ship was destroyed by fire at Philadelphia, Pennsylvania. |

== 19 February ==
List of shipwrecks: 19 February 1858
| Ship | State | Description |
|---|---|---|
| Alexander | United States | The whaling ship struck a submerged reef close to Cape Campbell, New Zealand, lost her helm and was holed. All but one of the crew survived. |

== 20 February ==
List of shipwrecks: 20 February 1858
| Ship | State | Description |
|---|---|---|
| Concordia | United Kingdom | The ship foundered in Broad Sound with the loss of all but her captain. She was on a voyage from Runcorn, Cheshire to Youghal, County Cork. |
| George and Elisa | France | The brig struck rocks and sank at Malta. She was on a voyage from South Shields, County Durham, United Kingdom to Dunkirk, Nord and Alexandria, Egypt. |
| Home | United Kingdom | The brig was abandoned in the Atlantic Ocean. Her crew were rescued by Greenock (United Kingdom). Home was on a voyage from Savannah, Georgia, United States to Cork. |
| Inkerman | United Kingdom | The brig was wrecked on the Sedore Edges with the loss of all but one of her crew. |
| John Milton | United States | The clipper was wrecked 5 nautical miles (9.3 km) west of the Montauk Point Lighthouse, New York with the loss of all hands. |
| Loyalty | United Kingdom | The schooner was driven ashore in South Bay, County Wexford. She was on a voyage from Newport, Monmouthshire to Wexford. |
| Medusa | France | The ship was wrecked on the Scarweather Sands, in the Bristol Channel off the coast of Glamorgan, United Kingdom. Her crew were rescued. She was on a voyage from Havre de Grâce, Seine-Inférieure to Cardiff, Glamorgan. |

== 21 February ==
List of shipwrecks: 21 February 1858
| Ship | State | Description |
|---|---|---|
| Albert | Belgium | The schooner was wrecked at Cape Tramonta, Chios, Greece. She was on a voyage from Trieste to Smyrna, Ottoman Empire. |
| Alliance | United Kingdom | The schooner was driven ashore and wrecked at Saint Sampson, Guernsey, Channel Islands. She was on a voyage from Saint Sampson to London. |
| Andover | United States | The ship was severely damaged by fire at New Orleans, Louisiana. |
| Ultonia | United Kingdom | The ship was sighted in the South Atlantic whilst on a voyage from London to Melbourne, Victoria. No further trace, presumed foundered with the loss of all hands. |
| William Singer | United States | The ship ran aground off Brook, Isle of Wight, United Kingdom. She was on a voyage from the Chincha Islands, Peru to Cowes, Isle of Wight. She was refloated on 22 February with the assistance off two tugs and towed in to Cowes in a severely leaky condition. |

== 22 February ==
List of shipwrecks: 22 February 1858
| Ship | State | Description |
|---|---|---|
| Breeze | United Kingdom | The brig ran aground 3 nautical miles (5.6 km) south of Lytham St. Annes, Lancashire. She was on a voyage from Alexandria, Egypt to Lytham St. Annes. |
| Dewryn | United Kingdom | The sloop was driven ashore at Ardglass, County Down. She was on a voyage from Portmadoc, Caernarfonshire to Aberdeen. |
| Edith Burne | United Kingdom | The ship ran aground in the Hooghly River. She was on a voyage from Calcutta, India to an English port. She was refloated and resumed her voyage. |
| F. M. C. | United Kingdom | The schooner was driven ashore at Machrerioch, Sanda Island, Argyllshire. Her crew were rescued. She was on a voyage from Liverpool, Lancashire to Londonderry. LM260258/> |
| Francis | United Kingdom | The ship ran aground at East Hartlepool, County Durham. She was on a voyage from Middlesbrough, Yorkshire to London. She was refloated and found to be leaky. |
| Kennebec | United States | The ship was abandoned in the Atlantic Ocean. Her crew were rescued. She was on a voyage from Liverpool to Mobile, Alabama. |

== 23 February ==
List of shipwrecks: 23 February 1858
| Ship | State | Description |
|---|---|---|
| City of Pekin | United Kingdom | The ship struck the South Rock, off the coast of Ireland. She was on a voyage from the Clyde to Calcutta, India. She consequently put in to Milford Haven, Pembrokeshire in a leaky condition. |
| Great Northern | United Kingdom | The steamship ran aground on the Longsand, in The Wash. She was on a voyage from Newcastle upon Tyne, Northumberland to London. She was refloated on 25 February and taken in to Wisbech, Cambridgeshire. |
| L'Etoile du Matin | France | The brig was driven ashore and wrecked in Cloughy Bay. She was on a voyage from Nantes, Loire-Inférieure to Liverpool, Lancashire, United Kingdom. She was refloated on 26 February and taken in to Belfast, county Antrim, United Kingdom. |

== 24 February ==
List of shipwrecks: 24 February 1858
| Ship | State | Description |
|---|---|---|
| British Queen | United Kingdom | The ship was wrecked near Lisbon, Portugal with the loss of all but two of her crew. She was on a voyage from the River Tyne to Lisbon. |
| Evangelistra | Greece | The brig was driven ashore and wrecked at Conil de la Frontera, Spain. Her crew were rescued. She was on a voyage from Cardiff, Glamorgan, United Kingdom to Marseille, Bouches-du-Rhône, France. |
| Ida | United Kingdom | The ship was driven ashore in Fehmarsund. |
| Iris | Grand Duchy of Oldenburg | The schooner was driven ashore near "Porgas", Ottoman Empire. She was on a voyage from Newcastle upon Tyne, Northumberland, United Kingdom to Constantinople, Ottoman Empire. She was consequently condemned. |
| James Moorehouse | United Kingdom | The ship was driven ashore and wrecked at Weymouth, Dorset. She was on a voyage from Portsmouth, Hampshire to Plymouth, Devon. |
| Montagu | United Kingdom | The steamship ran aground at "Hantoon", County Wexford. She was on a voyage from Liverpool, Lancashire to Wexford. She was refloated. |
| Thomas Worthington | United Kingdom | The ship foundered 50 nautical miles (93 km) off the Smalls Lighthouse. Her crew were rescued by Winifred (United Kingdom). Thomas Worthington was on a voyage from Newport, Monmouthshire to Southampton, Hampshire. |

== 25 February ==
List of shipwrecks: 25 February 1858
| Ship | State | Description |
|---|---|---|
| Colony | United Kingdom | The brig was driven ashore and wrecked at Tynemouth, Northumberland. Her crew were rescued by rocket apparatus. She was on a voyage from the River Tyne to Faversham, Kent. The wreck was plundered by the local inhabitants. |
| Oswy | United Kingdom | The brig ran aground on the Corton Sand, in the North Sea off the coast of Suffolk and was wrecked. Her twelve crew were rescued. by the Lowestoft Lifeboat. She was on a voyage from Hartlepool, County Durham to Shoreham-by-Sea, Sussex. |
| Russell | United Kingdom | The ship ran aground in the River Adur at Arundel, Sussex. She was refloated with the assistance of a tug. |
| Zagora | United Kingdom | The ship was wrecked at Chania, Crete. She was on a voyage from Liverpool, Lancashire to Heraklion, Crete and Alexandria, Egypt. |

== 26 February ==
List of shipwrecks: 26 February 1858
| Ship | State | Description |
|---|---|---|
| Bahia Packet | United Kingdom | The ship was driven ashore at Baldoyle, County Dublin. |
| Buffon | France | The brig was wrecked on Bird Island, Algoa Bay. All on board were rescued by Lady Grey, Rival (both United Kingdom) and local boats. |
| De Jonge | Netherlands | The crewless sloop was driven ashore at Ringbrough, Yorkshire, United Kingdom. |
| Edith Maria | United Kingdom | The schooner ran aground and capsized in the Seine with the loss of one life. She was on a voyage from Hull, Yorkshire to Rouen, Seine-Inférieure, France. She was righted and taken in to Pont-Audemer, Eure, France. |
| Eliza Carrew | United Kingdom | The barque foundered in the Atlantic Ocean. Her crew were rescued by the brig Maria ( Austrian Empire). She was on a voyage from Cardiff, Glamorgan to the Cape of Good Hope, Cape Colony. |
| Providence | United Kingdom | The sloop struck a sunken rock and sank at Coldingham, Berwickshire. Her crew survived. |
| Segaria | Spain | The barque struck the Runnel Stone. She floated off but consequently foundered 6 nautical miles (11 km) to the east. Her fifteen crew were rescued by the schooner Farewell. Segaria was on a voyage from Havana, Cuba to the Clyde. |

== 28 February ==
List of shipwrecks: 28 February 1858
| Ship | State | Description |
|---|---|---|
| St. Pierre | France | The ship was wrecked on the Goodwin Sands, Kent, United Kingdom. Her crew were rescued. She was on a voyage from Dunkirk, Nord to London, United Kingdom. |
| Southwold Lifeboat | United Kingdom | The lifeboat capsized with the loss of three of her eighteen crew. Ten survivors were rescued by the yawl Reliance (United Kingdom), the remainder swam ashore. |

== Unknown date ==
List of shipwrecks: Unknown date in February 1858
| Ship | State | Description |
|---|---|---|
| Aldina Anna Susanna | Netherlands | The schooner was wrecked at "Santa Foca" before 24 February. She was on a voyage from Trieste to Falmouth, Cornwall, United Kingdom. |
| Amelia | United Kingdom | The brig ran aground on the Cork Sand, in the North Sea off the coast of Suffolk. She was refloated and beached at Woodbridge, Suffolk. |
| Anna | Spain | The brig ran aground on the Longsand, in the North Sea off the coast of Essex, United Kingdom. She was refloated with assistance from Alfred, Celerity (both United Kingdom) and other vessels. |
| Ariel | United Kingdom | The schooner was driven ashore and wrecked on São Miguel Island, Azores. |
| Avenir | France | The schooner departed from Sunderland, County Durham, United Kingdom for Bilbao, Spain. No further trace, presumed foundered with the loss of all hands. |
| Avondale | United States | The ship was wrecked on the Arklow Bank, in the Irish Sea off the coast of County Wicklow, United Kingdom before 27 February. She was on a voyage from Liverpool, Lancashire, United Kingdom to New York. |
| Bernhard | Kingdom of Hanover | The brig was lost near Brindisi, Kingdom of the Two Sicilies before 27 February. She was on a voyage from Trieste to Falmouth |
| Brigand | United Kingdom | The ship was driven ashore and wrecked at Withernsea, Yorkshire. She was on a voyage from the River Tyne to Teignmouth, Devon. |
| Buono Principio | Austrian Empire | The barque was lost off Maranhão, Brazil. |
| Cabar Feigh | United Kingdom | The schooner was wrecked 240 nautical miles (440 km) north of Bergen, Norway. Her crew were rescued. She was on a voyage from Danzig to Leith, Lothian. |
| Catharina Maria | Netherlands | The ship ran aground off the Dutch coast. She was on a voyage from Batavia, Netherlands East Indies to a Dutch port. She had been refloated by 11 February and taken in to Hellevoetsluis, Zeeland. |
| Confederation | United States | The ship departed from New York for Australia. She was subsequently wrecked in the South Sea Islands. All sixteen people on board reached Ojee Island, but eight of them were lost in December 1862 when the put off in a boat to intercept a ship sighted off the island and did not return. |
| Duke | United Kingdom | The ship was driven ashore in Luce Bay before 12 February. She was on a voyage from Dublin to Stranraer, Wigtownshire. She had been refloated by 19 February. |
| Duke of Richmond | United Kingdom | The ship was destroyed by fire in the Indian Ocean before 9 February. Her crew survived. She was on a voyage from Ardrossan, Ayrshire to Singapore, Straits Settlements. |
| Elizabeth Archer | United Kingdom | The ship foundered off the coast of Ceylon before 12 February. Her crew were rescued by Timandra (United Kingdom). Elizabeth Archer was on a voyage from Colombo, Ceylon to Liverpool. |
| Flying Dutchman | United States | The clipper was wrecked at Brigantine Beach, New Jersey before 13 February. She was on a voyage from San Francisco, California to New York. |
| Helen | United Kingdom | The ship caught fire and was abandoned in the Indian Ocean before 14 February. She was on a voyage from London to Melbourne, Victoria. |
| Hibernia | United Kingdom | The ship was wrecked at Balranald, Uist, Outer Hebrides. |
| Jedo | Netherlands | The ship ran aground off the Dutch coast before 11 February. |
| John Gibson | United Kingdom | The ship foundered in the North Sea off the coast of Yorkshire on or before 27 February. Wreckage from the ship washed up a Redcar and Staithes. |
| Lady Seymour | (United Kingdom of Great Britain and Ireland) British North America | The ship was wrecked on Inagua, Bahamas before 11 February. |
| Laro | Austrian Empire | The ship was wrecked on the coast of Ottoman Syria. |
| Leonida | Greece | The brig was lost on or before 24 March. She was on a voyage from Trieste to Naples, Kingdom of the Two Sicilies. |
| Lizzy Sturgess | United Kingdom | The schooner was wrecked on the coast of Florida, United States before 4 February. She was on a voyage from Cienfuegos, Cuba to Boston, Massachusetts, United States. |
| Londonderry | United Kingdom | The ship foundered in the Atlantic Ocean before 25 February. Her crew were rescued. |
| Mackinaw | United States | The ship was driven ashore at Charleston, South Carolina. She was on a voyage from Liverpool to Charleston. She was refloated on 12 February and towed in to Charleston. |
| Magdalena | United Kingdom | The ship was driven ashore on Scattery Island, County Clare before 27 February. she was on a voyage from Brăila, Ottoman Empire to Cork. |
| Manchester | United Kingdom | The steamship ran aground at Tuticorin, India. She was refloated and sailed for Colombo. |
| Mary Allen | United Kingdom | The ship was wrecked at Hambantota, Ceylon. |
| Mirzapore | India | The ship ran aground and broke her back at Bombay. |
| Napoleon III | France | The ship struck a sunken rock and was damaged. She was on a voyage from Bombay, India to Liverpool. She put in to Saint Helena on 17 February in a leaky condition. |
| Nevin Packet | United Kingdom | The ship was driven ashore at Llanhaven, Caernarfonshire before 16 February. She was refloated. |
| Number Three | United Kingdom | The ship was driven ashore in the "Canide Islands", Ottoman Empire before 10 February. She was on a voyage from South Shields, County Durham to Malta and Sulina, Ottoman Empire. She was refloated and towed in to Tenedos, Ottoman Empire. |
| Pathfinder | United States | The ship was driven ashore in the Dardanelles. She was on a voyage from Boston, Massachusetts to Constantinople, Ottoman Empire. She was refloated with the assistance of a steamship and completed her voyage, arriving on 7 February. |
| Reward | United Kingdom | The ship foundered. Her crew were rescued by the steamship Cintra (United Kingdom). Reward was on a voyage from Newcastle upon Tyne, Northumberland to Cádiz, Spain. |
| Robin Hood | United Kingdom | The ship was driven ashore near Woosung, China before 5 February. She was on a voyage from Sunderland, County Durham to Woosung. Robin Hood was refloated and taken in to Woosung. |
| Sophia Koningin | Netherlands | The ship ran aground off the Dutch coast before 11 February. |
| Vohwaerts | Hamburg | The steamship was driven ashore near Ottendorf, Duchy of Schleswig before 3 February. |
| Wisch | Hamburg | The schooner ran aground on the Goodwin Sands, Kent, United Kingdom. She was on a voyage from Altona to Newfoundland, British North America. She was refloated and taken in to Ramsgate, Kent in a severely leaky condition. |
