= John Oakes =

John Oakes may refer to:

- John Milton Oakes (c. 1442–1485/86), English businessman
- John Wright Oakes (1820–1887), English painter
- John Bertram Oakes (1913–2001), American journalist
- Jackie Oakes (1919–1995), Scottish footballer
- John Oakes (apologist), Christian apologist
- John Cogswell Oakes (1906–1982), United States Army general
- John Waddington Oakes (1932–2021), British military officer and Olympic alpine skier
- John Oakes (DC Comics), fictional character
