= Bioregional mapping =

Bioregional mapping is a participatory approach to cartography that focuses on mapping the natural, ecological, and cultural features of a bioregion—an area defined by its natural boundaries, such as watersheds, ecosystems, and cultures that arise from a place, rather than human borders. This method highlights the interconnectedness of the region's natural systems and human communities, offering a holistic view of the landscape that integrates ecological data with cultural and historical insights.

Bioregional mapping is also a participatory process that invites community members to actively engage in the creation of their region's map. This approach empowers individuals to contribute to the documentation of local knowledge, history, and cultural significance, thereby creating maps that are more inclusive and representative of the lived experiences within the bioregion. Community mapping includes the identification of traditional pathways, local species, historical landmarks, stories, songs, how things change over time, and other culturally significant sites that might not appear on standard maps.

Sheila Harrington, in the introduction to Islands of the Salish Sea: A Community Atlas notes that:

"The atlas should be used as a jumping off place for decision making about the future. From the holistic image of place that the maps collectively communicate, what actions could be adopted to achieve sustainable prosperity? What priorities emerge from a survey of damaged lands and unsolved social ills? What underutilized potentials can be put to work to help achieve sustainability? The atlas can become a focus for discussions setting a proactive plan for positive change."

== Relationship with Indigenous Mapping ==
Bioregional mapping aligns with Indigenous mapping practices by recognizing the importance of natural boundaries and the relationship between people and their environment. The idea of bioregional mapping largely grew from the Tsleil-Waututh First Nation, Nisga'a, Tsilhqotʼin, Wetʼsuwetʼen first nations who used Bioregional Mapping to create some of the first bioregional atlases as part of court cases to defend their sovereignty in the 1980s and 1990s, one such example being the Tsilhqotʼin Nation v British Columbia.

This is put well by Douglas Aberley and chief Michael George noting that:

"Once the bioregional map atlas is completed it becomes the common foundation of knowledge from which planning scenarios can be prepared, and decisions ultimately made. Complex information that is otherwise difficult to present is clearly depicted. The community learns about itself in the process of making decisions about its future."

Both forms of mapping serve as tools for reclaiming narratives of the land, documenting traditional territories, and promoting sustainable land stewardship. This connection between bioregional and Indigenous mapping helps highlight the ongoing importance of traditional knowledge in understanding and preserving ecological systems.

This type of mapping is consistent with, and aligns with an indigenous and western worldview.
