= Raymond F. Dasmann =

American biologist and environmental conservationist

Raymond Fredric Dasmann (May 27, 1919 – November 5, 2002) was an American biologist and environmental conservationist whose works were formative to the field of environmental science. Among other achievements, he helped develop the idea of sustainable development and wrote an influential textbook, Environmental Conservation, first published in 1959; it was in its fifth edition at the time of Dasmann's death in 2002.

== Early life ==
Dasmann was born in San Francisco. He was the third and youngest child of Mary Dasmann (née McDonnell), an Irish immigrant, and William Dasmann, a police sergeant who died while Mary was pregnant. He attended Lowell High School there. He went on to San Francisco State College, but World War II intervened, and Dasmann served in the Army in Australia and New Guinea during the war. After his return Dasmann completed his undergraduate studies at the University of California, Berkeley. He went on to get a masters (1951) and PhD (1954) in zoology, studying under zoologist and conservationist A. Starker Leopold. Dasmann's graduate work was studying deer populations in California; he and his colleagues argued that a doe hunt was needed to bring the population under control, but hunters were afraid that this would reduce the population too much.

== Career ==
While finishing his PhD work, Dasmann spent 1953-1954 teaching at the University of Minnesota. He then accepted a position at Humboldt State University in Arcata, California, where he served as the chairman of the department of Natural Resources. In 1965 Dasmann published The Destruction of California, which Supreme Court justice William O. Douglas called "a stirring account of the conservation crisis in California" in his review in Holiday. The book was often required reading in college ecology courses in the 1970s.

Dasmann worked for the Conservation Foundation in Washington, D.C., as the director of international programs from 1966 to 1970 while also serving as a senior ecologist at the International Union for Conservation of Nature. From 1970 to 1971 he served as president of The Wildlife Society. Dasmann also consulted for UNESCO, where he developed the Man and the Biosphere Programme in 1971. From 1977 to his retirement in 1989 he was a professor of ecology at the University of California, Santa Cruz.

In 1987 he was a member of the first board of directors and then co-president of the Central California Coast Biosphere Reserve, now the Golden Gate Biosphere Network.

== Contributions and appreciations ==
Dasmann wrote or co-wrote hundreds of books and papers during his career. He helped develop the concepts of "eco-development" and biodiversity, and identified the crucial importance of recognizing indigenous peoples and their cultures in conserving natural landscapes.

After Dasmann's death, population scientist Paul R. Ehrlich said that Dasmann was "one of the great pioneers in trying to keep the human environment habitable and sustainable".

== Recognition ==
In 1974 Dasmann received the Edward W. Browning Achievement Award from the Smithsonian Institution "for the person who has made an outstanding contribution in enhancing the quality of our physical environment". He received the Aldo Leopold Award for distinguished service to conservation from The Wildlife Society in 1979. In 1988 he was given a Distinguished Service Award by the Society for Conservation Biology.

In 2010 Randall Jarrell published Raymond F. Dasmann: A Life in Conservation Biology, which transcribed oral history interviews with Dasmann.

Since 1979 the Western Section of The Wildlife Society has given an annual Raymond F. Dasmann Award for the Professional of the Year to "professionals who have made an outstanding contribution to wildlife resources management and understanding in California, Nevada, Hawaii, or Guam".

== Personal life ==
Dasmann met his future wife Elizabeth Sheldon, a painter, while in Australia during World War II. They were married in 1944. They had three daughters. She died in 1996. Dasmann died in 2002 in Santa Cruz, California.

== Works ==
- Environmental Conservation (1959)
- The Last Horizon (1963; National Book Award for Nonfiction finalist, 1964)
- African Game Ranching (1964)
- Wildlife Biology (1964)
- The Destruction of California (1965)
- A Different Kind of Country (1968)
- No Further Retreat: The Fight to Save Florida (1971)
- Planet in Peril? (1971)
- Ecological Principles for Economic Development (1973, with John P. Milton and Peter H. Freeman)
- The Conservation Alternative (1975)
- California's Changing Environment (1981)
- Called by the Wild: The Autobiography of a Conservationist (2002)
