= John P. Milton =

Qijong instructor

John P. Milton is a meditation and qigong instructor, author, and environmentalist. He is the founder of Sacred Passage and the Way of Nature.

He pioneered vision questing in contemporary Western culture in the 1940s. In 1945, at the time he began sacred solo retreats in the wilderness, vision quests were unknown in the Americas outside Native American culture. He received his M.S. in ecology and conservation from the University of Michigan in 1963. Milton is known for organizing and leading dozens of expeditions into some of the wildest areas on Earth, starting in his late teens. A founding father of the environmental movement in the early 1960s, he was a professor of environmental studies and a Woodrow Wilson Center scholar at the Smithsonian Institution. He was one of the first ecologists on staff at the White House as a member of the President's Council of Economic Advisors, and was a founding member of the environmental organization Friends of the Earth.

He is a frequent lecturer and workshop leader, and sought-after meditation and qigong teacher. Thousands of people have sought his instruction since he began teaching in the 1950s. He has developed unique practices for uniting inner and outer nature through training in Buddhist, Taoist, Vedantic, Tantric, and Native American spiritual traditions. He incorporates tai chi and yoga in his work. The book Discovering Beautiful: On The Road To Somewhere includes several sections detailing a student's apprenticeship with John.

His books and articles focus on inner development, qigong and ecology. He recently published the book Sky Above, Earth Below. Devotees of Milton say his programs inspire Earth stewardship by cultivating natural wisdom and an open, loving heart in the wild.

John Milton lives in Crestone, Colorado.

== Sources ==
- Milton, John P., Sky Above Earth Below: Study Guide, Sentient Publications, Boulder CO, ISBN 1-59181-028-0.
- Wilson, Bud and Jennifer Lennon, John P. Milton, Sacred Passages Teachers, retrieved March 2007.
