= John Milton Oakes =

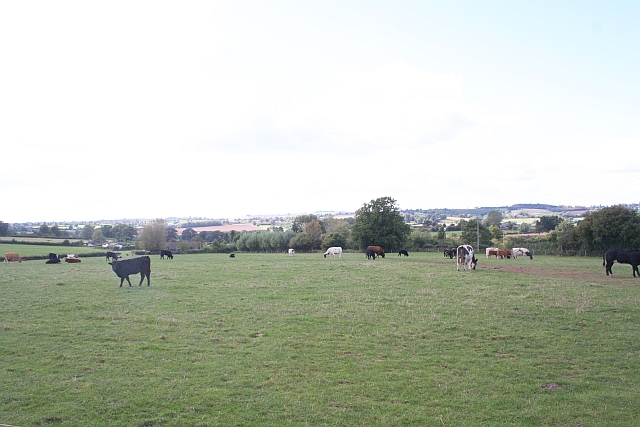
This field in Bromyard was among those the Oakes family owned. It is now used for its original purpose of cattle, while John Milton Oakes used it for growing cider.

John Milton Oakes (c. 1442 – 1485 or 1486) was a tavern owner and cider businessman in Bromyard, Herefordshire.

== Early life ==
Oakes' date of birth is not known, but according to church records at St Peter's, Bromyard, he was baptised on 17 March 1442. His father, also called John, was slain the previous 19 September as the French recaptured Île-de-France in the Hundred Years' War. In his absence, the family leased its farmland to the church until the younger John, an only child, came of age.

== Business career ==
On his 13th birthday, Oakes became of age and became the sole owner of his family's land. He negotiated for roughly an eighth of it to remain church property, for a fee of £30 8 s 9 ½ d. His father had been a cattle farmer, but a period of frequent livestock thefts led Oakes to switch to cider. Even with his gains from the sale to the church, he fell into debt during the long wait until the beginning of cultivation in August and the release of the first batch in June.

Fortunately for Oakes, because of his position as the only cider grower in Bromyard, he enjoyed a profitable first summer and wiped out his debt. In 1460 he built a first tavern where his cider would be sold. It remained in family ownership until its destruction in the English Civil War.

== Family and later life ==
In 1467, he married 19-year-old Elizabeth Francis, with whom he had five children. She died giving birth to the last one in 1479. A 1486 church document written to describe the changes in the town since the beginning of the rule of Henry VII mentions that Oakes died in that period, though it is unknown how he died or where he was buried. Richard, his only son to survive him, inherited his business.
