= John Milton (ship) =

American marine vessel

Coordinates: 41.1325°N 72.0866°W

History

United States
- Name: John Milton
- Owner: Edward Mott Robinson, Esq
- Port of registry: New Bedford, MA
- Builder: Reuben Fish
- Cost: about $100,000
- Launched: 1854, Fairhaven, MA
- Fate: Wrecked February 20, 1858

General characteristics
- Tons burthen: 1,444 tons

John Milton, a 1,444-ton vessel built in Fairhaven, Massachusetts, was wrecked on February 20, 1858 5 nautical miles (9 km) west of the Montauk Lighthouse, killing all 32 or 33 people on board, in one of the worst maritime disasters off the east coast of on Long Island, New York.

Built in 1854, John Milton was captained by Ephraim Harding of Martha's Vineyard, with its home port at New Bedford, Massachusetts. The 43-year-old Harding was born in New Bedford. Also on board was the captain's teenage son, Rudolphus Hancock Harding.

The ship left New York City on December 6, 1856. After loading a cargo of guano at the Chincha Islands in the Pacific Ocean off the coast of Peru, she returned to the United States from South America, stopping at Norfolk, Virginia, on February 14, 1858. She sailed northeast two days later, presumably heading for New York City. A blinding snowstorm and gale sprang up, and temperatures plunged to 8 °F (−13 °C). Captain Harding may have confused the Shinnecock Lighthouse at Ponquogue Point in Hampton Bays, which had been erected in his absence, for the Montauk Light, and ran aground off the shore at what is known today as "Ditch Plains".

The frozen bodies of 24 sailors washed ashore and were buried at the South End Burying Ground in East Hampton, New York, where there is a marble monument today. Harding's body was identified, but his son's was never found. Capt. Harding's body was returned home and is buried in the Village Cemetery in Vineyard Haven, MA.
