= List of Archaeidae species =

This page lists all described species of the spider family Archaeidae accepted by the World Spider Catalog as of January 2021:

== A ==
=== Afrarchaea ===
Afrarchaea Forster & Platnick, 1984

- A. ansieae Lotz, 2015 — South Africa
- A. bergae Lotz, 1996 — South Africa
- A. cornuta (Lotz, 2003) — South Africa
- A. entabeniensis Lotz, 2003 — South Africa
- A. fernkloofensis Lotz, 1996 — South Africa
- A. godfreyi (Hewitt, 1919) (type) — South Africa
- A. haddadi Lotz, 2006 — South Africa
- A. harveyi Lotz, 2003 — South Africa
- A. kranskopensis Lotz, 1996 — South Africa
- A. lawrencei Lotz, 1996 — South Africa
- A. neethlingi Lotz, 2017 — South Africa
- A. ngomensis Lotz, 1996 — South Africa
- A. royalensis Lotz, 2006 — South Africa
- A. woodae Lotz, 2006 — South Africa

=== † Archaea ===
† Archaea Koch and Berendt, 1854

- † A. bitterfeldensis Wunderlich, 2004
- † A. compacta Wunderlich, 2004
- † A. paradoxa Koch and Berendt, 1854
- † A. pougneti Simon, 1884

=== † Archaemecys ===
† Archaemecys Saupe and Selden, 2009 - Archaeinae

=== Austrarchaea ===
Austrarchaea

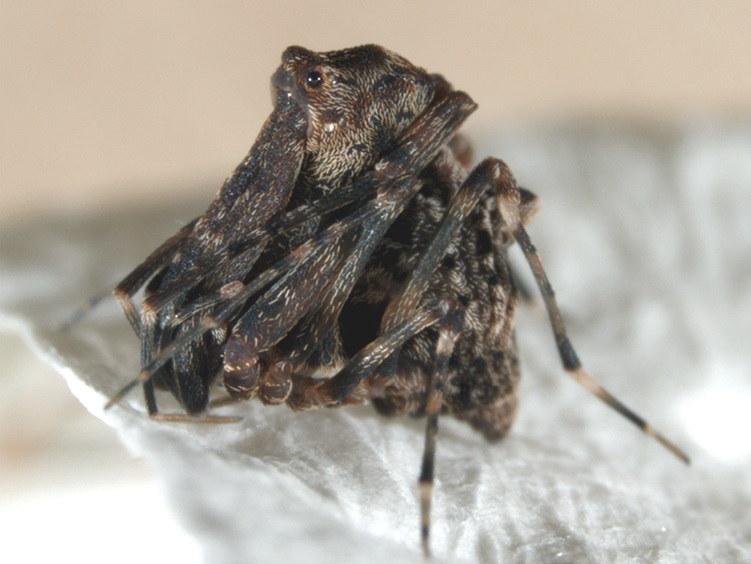
Austrarchaea griswoldi

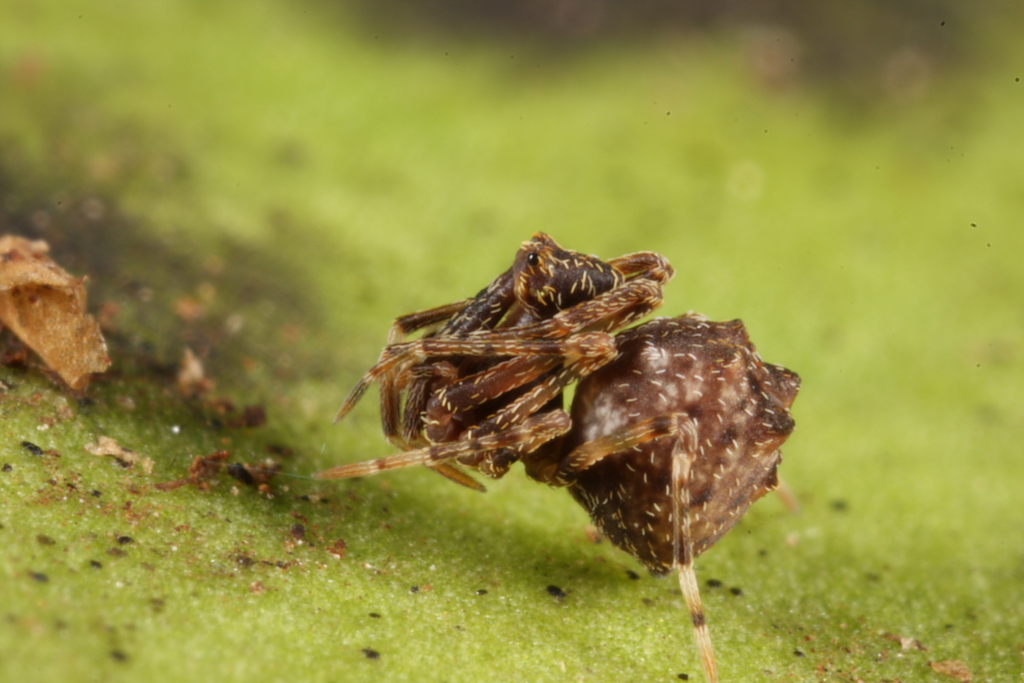
Austrarchaea sp.

Austrarchaea Forster & Platnick, 1984

- A. alani Rix & Harvey, 2011 — Australia (Queensland)
- A. aleenae Rix & Harvey, 2011 — Australia (Queensland)
- A. binfordae Rix & Harvey, 2011 — Australia (New South Wales)
- A. christopheri Rix & Harvey, 2011 — Australia (New South Wales)
- A. clyneae Rix & Harvey, 2011 — Australia (Queensland, New South Wales)
- A. cunninghami Rix & Harvey, 2011 — Australia (Queensland)
- A. daviesae Forster & Platnick, 1984 — Australia (Queensland)
- A. dianneae Rix & Harvey, 2011 — Australia (Queensland)
- A. griswoldi Rix & Harvey, 2012 — Australia (Queensland)
- A. harmsi Rix & Harvey, 2011 — Australia (Queensland)
- A. helenae Rix & Harvey, 2011 — Australia (New South Wales)
- A. hoskini Rix & Harvey, 2012 — Australia (Queensland)
- A. judyae Rix & Harvey, 2011 — Australia (Queensland)
- A. karenae Rix & Harvey, 2012 — Australia (Queensland)
- A. mascordi Rix & Harvey, 2011 — Australia (New South Wales)
- A. mcguiganae Rix & Harvey, 2011 — Australia (New South Wales)
- A. milledgei Rix & Harvey, 2011 — Australia (New South Wales)
- A. monteithi Rix & Harvey, 2011 — Australia (New South Wales)
- A. nodosa (Forster, 1956) (type) — Australia (Queensland, New South Wales)
- A. platnickorum Rix & Harvey, 2011 — Australia (New South Wales)
- A. raveni Rix & Harvey, 2011 — Australia (Queensland)
- A. smithae Rix & Harvey, 2011 — Australia (New South Wales)
- A. tealei Rix & Harvey, 2012 — Australia (Queensland)
- A. thompsoni Rix & Harvey, 2012 — Australia (Queensland)
- A. wallacei Rix & Harvey, 2012 — Australia (Queensland)
- A. westi Rix & Harvey, 2012 — Australia (Queensland)
- A. woodae Rix & Harvey, 2012 — Australia (Queensland)

== B ==
=== † Baltarchaea ===
† Baltarchaea Eskov, 1992 - Archaeinae

- † B. conica Koch and Berendt, 1854

=== † Burmesarchaea ===
† Burmesarchaea Wunderlich, 2008 - Archaeinae

== E ==
=== † Eoarchaea ===
† Eoarchaea Forster and Platnick, 1984 - Archaeinae

- † E. hyperoptica Menge, 1854
- † E. vidua Wunderlich, 2004

=== Eriauchenus ===
Eriauchenus O. Pickard-Cambridge, 1881

- E. andriamanelo Wood & Scharff, 2018 — Madagascar
- E. andrianampoinimerina Wood & Scharff, 2018 — Madagascar
- E. bourgini (Millot, 1948) — Madagascar
- E. fisheri (Lotz, 2003) — Madagascar
- E. goodmani Wood & Scharff, 2018 — Madagascar
- E. harveyi Wood & Scharff, 2018 — Madagascar
- E. lukemacaulayi Wood & Scharff, 2018 — Madagascar
- E. mahariraensis (Lotz, 2003) — Madagascar
- E. milajaneae Wood & Scharff, 2018 — Madagascar
- E. milloti Wood & Scharff, 2018 — Madagascar
- E. pauliani (Legendre, 1970) — Madagascar
- E. rafohy Wood & Scharff, 2018 — Madagascar
- E. ranavalona Wood & Scharff, 2018 — Madagascar
- E. rangita Wood & Scharff, 2018 — Madagascar
- E. ratsirarsoni (Lotz, 2003) — Madagascar
- E. rixi Wood & Scharff, 2018 — Madagascar
- E. sama Wood & Scharff, 2018 — Madagascar
- E. workmani O. Pickard-Cambridge, 1881 (type) — Madagascar
- E. wunderlichi Wood & Scharff, 2018 — Madagascar
- E. zirafy Wood & Scharff, 2018 — Madagascar

== M ==
=== Madagascarchaea ===
Madagascarchaea Wood & Scharff, 2018

- M. ambre (Wood, 2008) — Madagascar
- M. anabohazo (Wood, 2008) — Madagascar
- M. borimontsina (Wood, 2008) — Madagascar
- M. fohy Wood & Scharff, 2018 — Madagascar
- M. gracilicollis (Millot, 1948) (type) — Madagascar
- M. griswoldi (Wood, 2008) — Madagascar
- M. halambohitra (Wood, 2008) — Madagascar
- M. jeanneli (Millot, 1948) — Madagascar
- M. lavatenda (Wood, 2008) — Madagascar
- M. legendrei (Platnick, 1991) — Madagascar
- M. lotzi Wood & Scharff, 2018 — Madagascar
- M. moramora Wood & Scharff, 2018 — Madagascar
- M. namoroka (Wood, 2008) — Madagascar
- M. rabesahala Wood & Scharff, 2018 — Madagascar
- M. spiceri (Wood, 2008) — Madagascar
- M. tsingyensis (Lotz, 2003) — Madagascar
- M. vadoni (Millot, 1948) — Madagascar
- M. voronakely (Wood, 2008) — Madagascar

=== † Myrmecarchaea ===
† Myrmecarchaea Wunderlich, 2004 - Archaeinae

- † M. pediculus Wunderlich, 2004
- † M. petiolus Wunderlich, 2004

== P ==
=== † Patarchaea ===
† Patarchaea Selden et al., 2008 - Archaeinae

- † P. muralis Selden et al., 2008

== S ==
=== † Saxonarchaea ===
† Saxonarchaea Wunderlich, 2004 - Archaeinae

- † S. dentata Wunderlich, 2004
- † S. diabolica Wunderlich, 2004

== Z ==
=== Zephyrarchaea ===
Zephyrarchaea

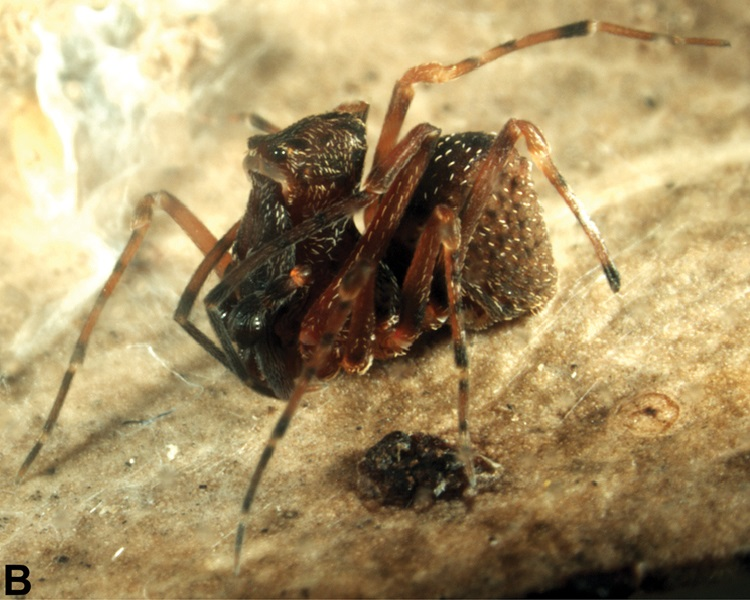
Zephyrarchaea barrettae

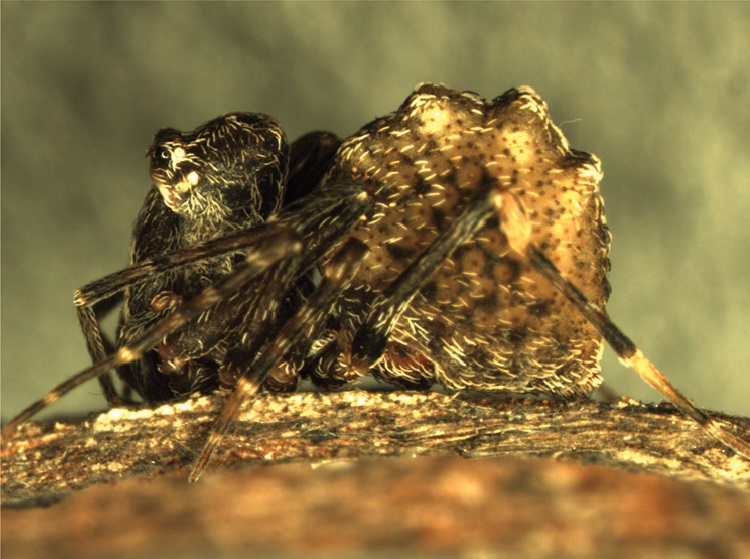
Main's assassin spider (Zephyrarchaea mainae)

Zephyrarchaea Rix & Harvey, 2012

- Z. austini Rix & Harvey, 2012 — Australia (South Australia)
- Z. barrettae Rix & Harvey, 2012 — Australia (Western Australia)
- Z. grayi Rix & Harvey, 2012 — Australia (Victoria)
- Z. janineae Rix & Harvey, 2012 — Australia (Western Australia)
- Z. mainae (Platnick, 1991) (type) — Australia (Western Australia)
- Z. marae Rix & Harvey, 2012 — Australia (Victoria)
- Z. marki Rix & Harvey, 2012 — Australia (Western Australia)
- Z. melindae Rix & Harvey, 2012 — Australia (Western Australia)
- Z. porchi Rix & Harvey, 2012 — Australia (Victoria)
- Z. robinsi (Harvey, 2002) — Australia (Western Australia)
- Z. vichickmani Rix & Harvey, 2012 — Australia (Victoria)
