= Archaea (spider) =

- Lithograph of female Archaea paradoxa

Scientific classification
- Kingdom: Animalia
- Phylum: Arthropoda
- Subphylum: Chelicerata
- Class: Arachnida
- Order: Araneae
- Infraorder: Araneomorphae
- Family: Archaeidae
- Genus: †Archaea; C.L. Koch & Berendt, 1854

Species
- See text.

Extinct genus of spiders

Archaea is an extinct genus of spiders in the family Archaeidae. As of October 2016, four species are placed (or possibly placed) in the genus. All have been found preserved in amber, either from the Baltic or Bitterfeld, Germany. First described in 1854, Archaea species have a distinctive "neck" separating the head from the thorax, and very long chelicerae ("jaws").

== Description ==
In the genus Archaea, the head is separated from the thorax by a deep fold, forming a "neck", so that the globular head appears to sit on the thorax. There are eight eyes, four on each side of the head, arranged in the shape of a rhombus, with the front eyes being the largest. The curved chelicerae are very long, longer than the head, with long, strong fangs. The pedipalps of the female are very small and thin, shorter than the chelicerae, the third and last segments being short, the latter needle-shaped. Those of the male are sturdier, the third segment being almost as long as the second, with the end segment bearing the palpal bulbs. The thorax is relatively flat, narrower at the back than the front, and without thoracic grooves. The legs are long and thin. The first pair are the longest, the second somewhat longer than the fourth, the third being the shortest. The patellae and tarsi are short, without spines or bristles.

Living members of the family Archaeidae are predators on other spiders (araneophageous); it is assumed that extinct members of the family had the same habits.

== Taxonomy ==
The genus Archaea was erected in 1854 by C. L. Koch and G. C. Berendt, initially with three extinct species, all found in amber from the Baltic Sea or Bitterfeld in Saxony-Anhalt, Germany. It was then the only genus in the family Archaeidae. The first living species in the family was described in 1881 by O. Pickard-Cambridge. He placed it in the genus Eriauchenius as E. workmani. In 1895, Eugène Simon transferred this species to Archaea as Archaea workmani. Other living species were placed in the genus later, but all are now considered to belong to different genera.

=== Species ===
- †?Archaea bitterfeldensis Wunderlich, 2004 – Bitterfeld amber
- †Archaea compacta Wunderlich, 2004 – Baltic amber
- †Archaea paradoxa C.L. Koch & Berendt, 1854 (syn. Archaea laevigata C. L. Koch & Berendt, 1854, Archaea incompta Menge, 1854) (type species) – Baltic amber
- †Archaea pougneti Simon, 1884 – Baltic amber

Fossil species that have been placed in Archaea but are now placed elsewhere include:

- †Eoarchaea hyperoptica (Menge, 1854) = Archaea hyperoptica
- †Baltarchaea conica (Koch & Berendt 1854) = Archaea conica
