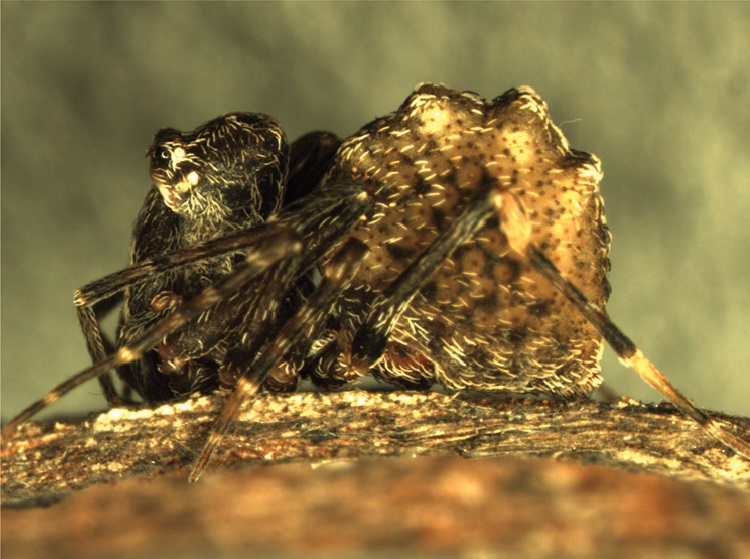
- Zephyrarchaea mainae, Bremer Bay, Western Australia

Scientific classification
- Kingdom: Animalia
- Phylum: Arthropoda
- Subphylum: Chelicerata
- Class: Arachnida
- Order: Araneae
- Infraorder: Araneomorphae
- Family: Archaeidae
- Genus: Zephyrarchaea
- Species: Z. mainae

Binomial name
- Zephyrarchaea mainae (Platnick) Rix & Harvey, 2012

Synonyms
- Austrarchaea mainae Platnick, 1991

= Zephyrarchaea mainae =

Species of spider

Zephyrarchaea mainae is a species of spider, informally known as Main's assassin spider, Albany assassin spider, and the Western archaeid spider. The first of the assassin spider family (Araneae, Archaeidae) found in Western Australia, the species was unknown until its collection at Torndirrup National Park near Albany was published in 1987.

== Taxonomy ==
Formally described as Austrarchaea mainae by Norman Platnick in 1991, the spider was nominated as the type species for the Australian endemic genus Zephyrarchaea. This split from the more widely distributed Austrarchaea was published in 2012, after further specimens were found and collected in nearby areas, along with several other related archaeid species discovered in the region. Comparative analysis of genotyped archaeid species supports the spider's classification as a species, as does the restricted mobility and specialised habitat of populations.

== Description ==
A species of Archaeidae (assassin spider) is around three millimetres long. One distinguishing characteristic is the presence of six humps on the upper side of the abdomen, not found on any species of Zephyrarchaea but the nearby and closely related Zephyrarchaea janineae; these tubercles are arranged in three pairs. The feature is reduced in collections of the Eastern population near Bremer, suggesting they are an emergent species.

== Distribution ==
Found only near the southern coast of Southwest Australia, a biodiversity hotspot, the species is listed as ‘Threatened’ under the Western Australian Wildlife Conservation Act 1950.

The range centres on Torndirrup south of Albany, to the Walpole-Nornalup National Park in the west and eastward to Bremer Bay. The population also occurs inland near the Porongurup Range.

Zephyrarchaea mainae is restricted to a high rainfall, near coastal habitat of heathland or forest. Most often associated with bushland dominated by Agonis flexuosa (weeping peppermint), or low shrubs, an outlying population has been collected in karri forest.

== Habitat ==
The habitat within the wider range of Z. mainae is restricted to particular assemblages of flora, which the understory of sedges, Lepidosperma gladiatum and Lepidosperma effusum, and other grasses such Empodisma gracillimum form an elevated and complex crown of leaf and branch litter. The habitat is vulnerable to changes in fire regimes, and the species occurs only when it has remained unburnt for many decades.
