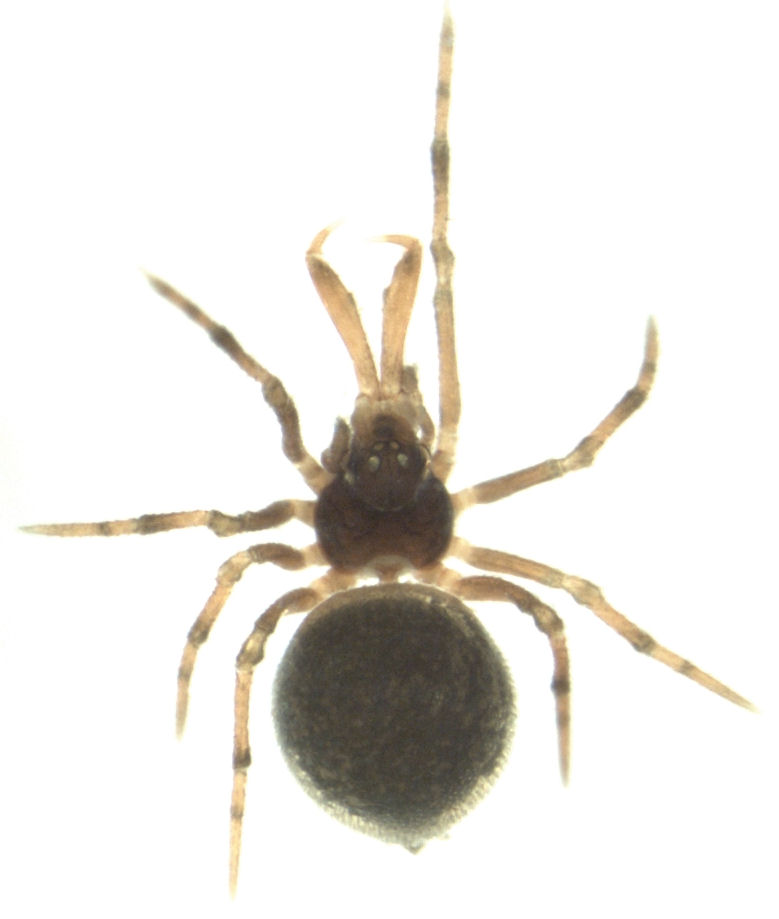
- Holarchaea species from New Zealand, possibly Holarchaea novaeseelandiae

Scientific classification
- Kingdom: Animalia
- Phylum: Arthropoda
- Subphylum: Chelicerata
- Class: Arachnida
- Order: Araneae
- Infraorder: Araneomorphae
- Family: Anapidae
- Genus: Holarchaea; Forster, 1955

Type species
- H. novaeseelandiae (Forster, 1949)

Species
- H. globosa (Hickman, 1981) – Australia (Tasmania); H. novaeseelandiae (Forster, 1949) – New Zealand
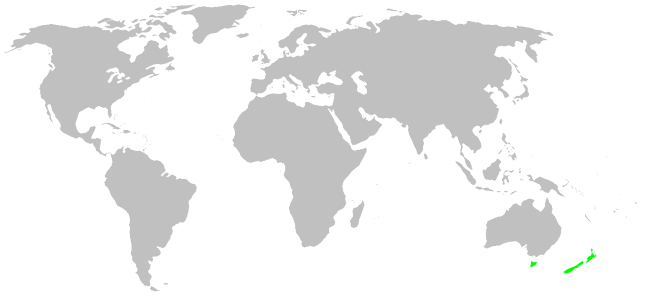

= Holarchaea =

Genus of spiders

Holarchaea is a genus of South Pacific araneomorph spiders in the family Anapidae, and was first described by Raymond Robert Forster in 1955. As of October 2026 it contains only two species, H. globosa and H. novaeseelandiae, but there may still be undescribed species in New Zealand.

These spiders are shiny black to beige, and grow up to 1.5 millimetres (0.059 in) long. They are one of few spider taxa that do not have venom glands.

They are known only from the forests of Tasmania and New Zealand, where they live in many microhabitats that regularly have high humidity. Originally placed with the assassin spiders, it was moved to its own family, Holarchaeidae, in 1984, and Holarchaeidae was synonymized with Anapidae in 2017.
