= Austrarchaea andersoni =

Scientific classification
- Kingdom: Animalia
- Phylum: Arthropoda
- Subphylum: Chelicerata
- Class: Arachnida
- Order: Araneae
- Infraorder: Araneomorphae
- Family: Archaeidae
- Genus: Austrarchaea
- Species: A. andersoni

Binomial name
- Austrarchaea andersoni Rix, 2024
- Holotype site (QMBA QMB S124036 Conway National Park)

Species of spider

Austrarchaea andersoni is a species of assassin spider in the family Archaeidae. It is endemic to Queensland, where it is found in the Conway National Park.
