= Greta Binford =

American arachnologist

Greta J. Binford
- Education: Purdue University; Miami University
- Occupation: Arachnologist
- Employer: Lewis & Clark College
- Awards: Oregon Professor of the Year (2011)
- Website: college.lclark.edu/live/profiles/22-greta-binford

Greta J. Binford is a United States arachnologist, specialising in studies of spider venom. She is a professor of biology at Lewis & Clark College in Portland, Oregon, United States.

As a child, Binford was raised on a small corn-and-soybean farm in west-central Indiana. From 1983 to 1985, she studied psychology at Purdue University, after an abortive attempt at a degree in veterinary medicine. While qualifying to be a science teacher at Miami University, she was offered the chance to study spiders in Peru's Amazon basin for the summer, and obtained a B.A. in Zoology at Miami in 1990. Afterwards, she undertook post-graduate studies at the University of Utah from 1991 to 1993, obtaining an M.S. in Biology in 1993. She obtained a PhD from the University of Arizona in 2000.

She joined Lewis & Clark as an assistant professor in 2003, becoming associate professor in June 2009. She was named Oregon Professor of the Year for 2011, and is the subject of the 2011 children's book Silk and Venom: Searching for a Dangerous Spider, by Kathryn Lasky and the photographer Christopher G. Knight. She sits on the editorial board of the open-access scientific journal Toxins.

The species of spider Austrarchaea binfordae, found in New South Wales, Australia, is named in her honour, "for her pioneering research on spider venoms and for contributing to a highly successful basal clades tour".

Greta also appeared in season 4, episode 6, of Fetch! With Ruff Ruffman, "Finding Eight-Legged Tights Isn't Easy".
