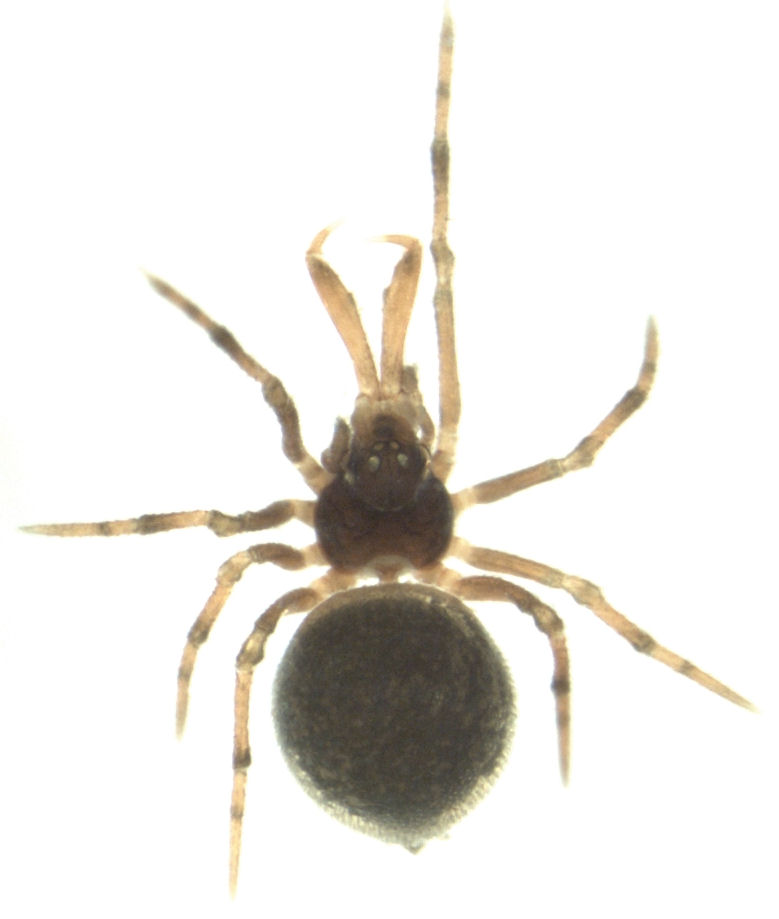
- Holarchaea species from New Zealand, possibly Holarchaea novaeseelandiae

Conservation status
- Not Threatened (NZ TCS)

Scientific classification
- Kingdom: Animalia
- Phylum: Arthropoda
- Subphylum: Chelicerata
- Class: Arachnida
- Order: Araneae
- Infraorder: Araneomorphae
- Family: Anapidae
- Genus: Holarchaea
- Species: H. novaeseelandiae

Binomial name
- Holarchaea novaeseelandiae (Forster, 1949)

Synonyms
- Archaea novaeseelandiae

= Holarchaea novaeseelandiae =

Species of spider

Holarchaea novaeseelandiae is one of only two described species in the spider genus Holarchaea, and is endemic to New Zealand.

== Description ==
This spider is very small, less than 1.5 millimetres long. It is shiny black, brown, olive or buff in colour. The head region is clearly demarcated, has eight eyes and a few setae.

== Distribution and habitat ==
This spider occurs only in the forests of New Zealand. It lives in humid environments and has been found on moss, plant litter and ferns.

== Conservation status ==
Under the New Zealand Threat Classification System, this species is listed as "Not Threatened".
