= Eriauchenus andrianampoinimerina =

Conservation status
- Near Threatened (IUCN 3.1)

Scientific classification
- Domain: Eukaryota
- Kingdom: Animalia
- Phylum: Arthropoda
- Subphylum: Chelicerata
- Class: Arachnida
- Order: Araneae
- Infraorder: Araneomorphae
- Family: Archaeidae
- Genus: Eriauchenus
- Species: E. andrianampoinimerina

Binomial name
- Eriauchenus andrianampoinimerina Wood and Schraff, 2018

Species of spider

Eriauchenus andrianampoinimerina is a species of spider in the family Archaeidae. It is endemic to Madagascar.

== Taxonomy ==
The holotype was collected by Hannah Wood and Nikolaj Schraff in the Montagne d’Anjanaharibe. The specific name commemorates King Andrianampoinimerina, who unified the Merina Kingdom. The genus name has also been incorrectly spelt "Eriauchenius".

== Habitat and distribution ==
The spider is found in Montagne d’Anjanaharibe, in montane rainforest, rainforest, and montane shrubland.
