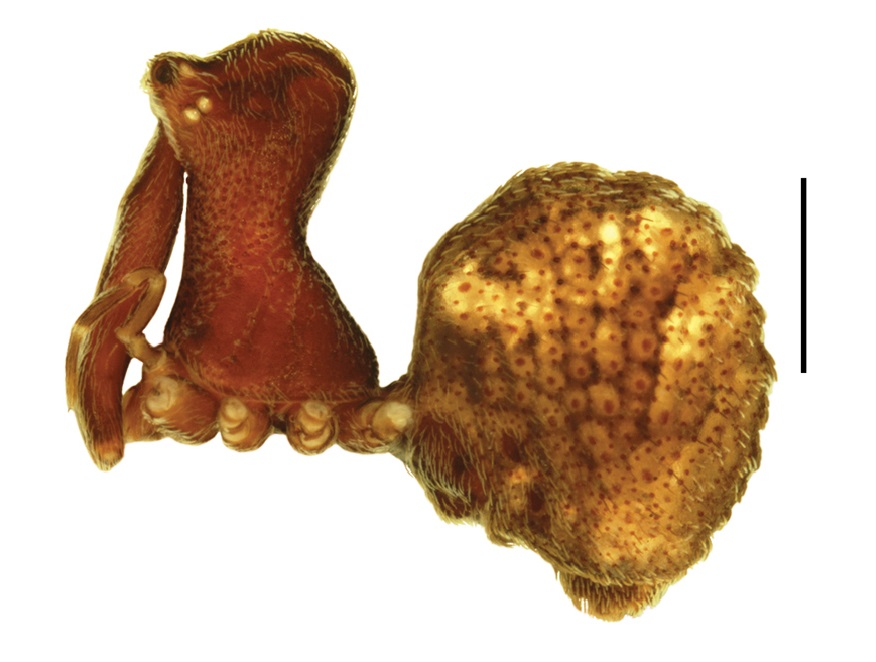

Scientific classification
- Domain: Eukaryota
- Kingdom: Animalia
- Phylum: Arthropoda
- Subphylum: Chelicerata
- Class: Arachnida
- Order: Araneae
- Infraorder: Araneomorphae
- Family: Archaeidae
- Genus: Zephyrarchaea
- Species: Z. grayi

Binomial name
- Zephyrarchaea grayi Rix & Harvey, 2012

= Zephyrarchaea grayi =

Species of spider

Zephyrarchaea grayi, also known as the Grampians Assassin Spider, is a species of spider in the family Archaeidae. It is endemic to Grampians National Park in Australia.

== Taxonomy ==
The holotype of the species was collected in Delley's Dell in the Grampians National Park. The specific epithet is a patronym in honor of Dr. Mike Gray, who first collected the holotype for this species.

== Description ==
Females of the species are 3.36 mm in length.

== Distribution and habitat ==
The species is only known to inhabit wet eucalypt forest in Grampians National Park.

== Conservation ==
The species is a short-range endemic taxon whose range is restricted to the Grampians National Park. It is threatened by fire and climate change. A search of the type locality in 2010 after a fire failed to find any specimens.
