= Austrarchaea tealei =

Scientific classification
- Kingdom: Animalia
- Phylum: Arthropoda
- Subphylum: Chelicerata
- Class: Arachnida
- Order: Araneae
- Infraorder: Araneomorphae
- Family: Archaeidae
- Genus: Austrarchaea
- Species: A. tealei

Binomial name
- Austrarchaea tealei Rix & Harvey, 2012

Species of spider from Australia

Austrarchaea tealei is a species of spider in the family Archaeidae. It is endemic to Australia.
