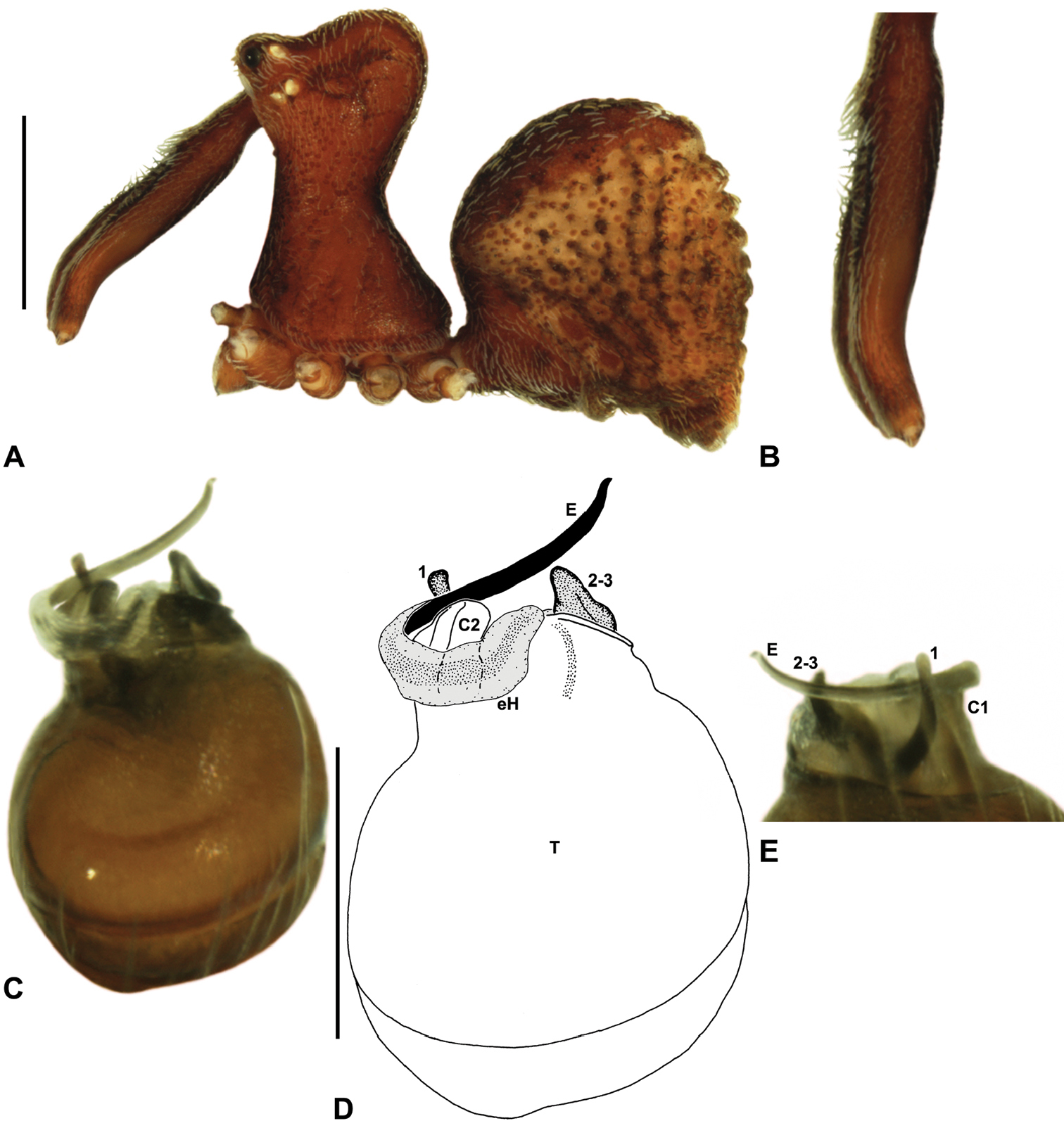

Scientific classification
- Domain: Eukaryota
- Kingdom: Animalia
- Phylum: Arthropoda
- Subphylum: Chelicerata
- Class: Arachnida
- Order: Araneae
- Infraorder: Araneomorphae
- Family: Archaeidae
- Genus: Zephyrarchaea
- Species: Z. porchi

Binomial name
- Zephyrarchaea porchi Rix & Harvey, 2012

= Zephyrarchaea porchi =

Species of spider

The Otway Range Assassin Spider (Zephyrarchaea porchi) is a species of spider in the family Archaeidae. It is endemic to Victoria, Australia.

== Taxonomy ==
The holotype for the species was collected near the Cape Otway Lighthouse by Dr. Nicholas Porch. The species-specific name is a patronym in his honor.

== Description ==
The length of the spider is 2.77 mm.

== Distribution and habitat ==
It is found only in the Otway Range, north of Cape Otway. The only known specimen was caught in a eucalypt forest with a dense bracken fern understory.

== Conservation ==
The abundance of protected forests near the type locality suggest that the spider is unlikely of meriting conservation concern.
