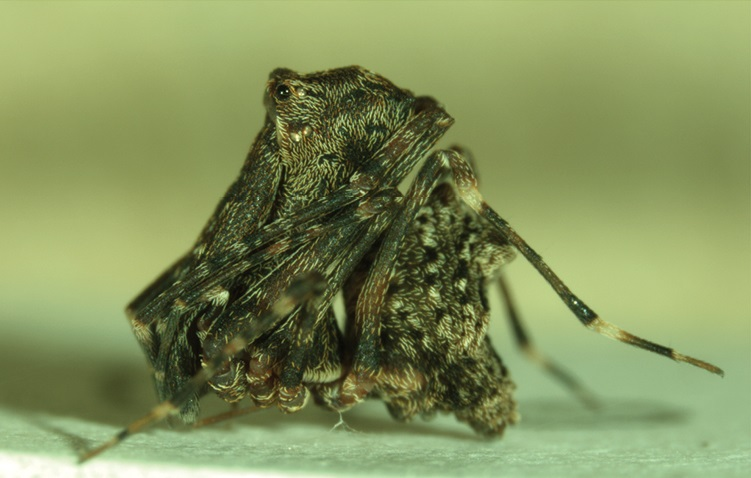

Scientific classification
- Domain: Eukaryota
- Kingdom: Animalia
- Phylum: Arthropoda
- Subphylum: Chelicerata
- Class: Arachnida
- Order: Araneae
- Infraorder: Araneomorphae
- Family: Archaeidae
- Genus: Austrarchaea
- Species: A. griswoldi

Binomial name
- Austrarchaea griswoldi Rix & Harvey, 2012

= Austrarchaea griswoldi =

Species of spider

Austrarchaea griswoldi is a species of spider in the family Archaeidae. It is endemic to Australia.
