= Austrarchaea harmsi =

Scientific classification
- Domain: Eukaryota
- Kingdom: Animalia
- Phylum: Arthropoda
- Subphylum: Chelicerata
- Class: Arachnida
- Order: Araneae
- Infraorder: Araneomorphae
- Family: Archaeidae
- Genus: Austrarchaea
- Species: A. harmsi

Binomial name
- Austrarchaea harmsi Rix & Harvey, 2011

Species of spider

Austrarchaea harmsi is a species of spider in the family Archaeidae. It is endemic to Australia.
