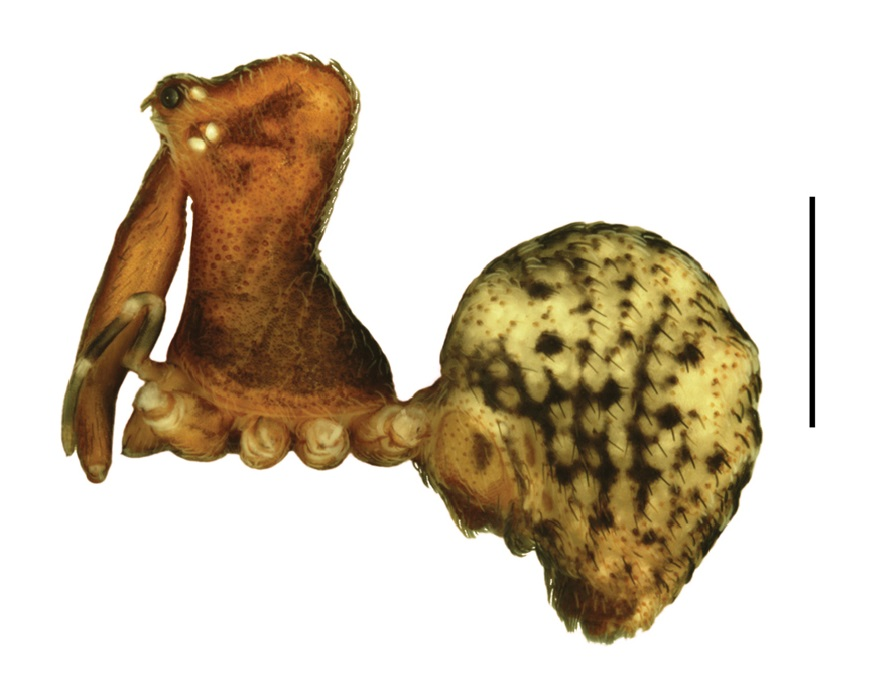
- Zephyrarchaea austini

Conservation status
- Critically Endangered (IUCN 3.1)

Scientific classification
- Kingdom: Animalia
- Phylum: Arthropoda
- Subphylum: Chelicerata
- Class: Arachnida
- Order: Araneae
- Infraorder: Araneomorphae
- Family: Archaeidae
- Genus: Zephyrarchaea
- Species: Z. austini

Binomial name
- Zephyrarchaea austini Rix & Harvey, 2012

= Zephyrarchaea austini =

Species of spider

Zephyrarchaea austini or the Kangaroo Island assassin spider is a species of Australian assassin spiders that is endemic to the north west of Kangaroo Island, South Australia. It was discovered in 2010, and described 2012 by Michael G. Rix and Mark Harvey, and named for Andy Austin.

== Description ==
The Kangaroo Island assassin spider is 2 mm (0.079 in) in size and lives in leaf litter of wet eucalypt woodland near Billy Goat Falls in the Western River Wilderness Protection Area on the island.

The females are distinguished from other members of the Zephyrarchaea genus by a small body size, a carapace length of less than 1.10mm a height/length ratio of less than 1.70mm. Additionally they have no tubercles on the abdomen, and a "strongly concave post-ocular depression in the lateral view". The males are unknown.

== Conservation status ==
They were thought to be possibly extinct following the 2019–2020 Australian bushfires, after their only known habitat was burnt. The scientists who originally discovered it described its survival is "unlikely at best".

However, a female and a juvenile spider were found in September 2021 by researchers from the South Australian Museum, and DNA analysis confirmed that they were of the same species. The facts that they were found outside the species' formerly known range in the Western River Protection Area, and that one is a juvenile, has given hope that there may be more populations. However the low dispersal remaining after the fires has likely led to less genetic diversity and therefore greater vulnerability, so intervention may be considered in the future to assist survival.
