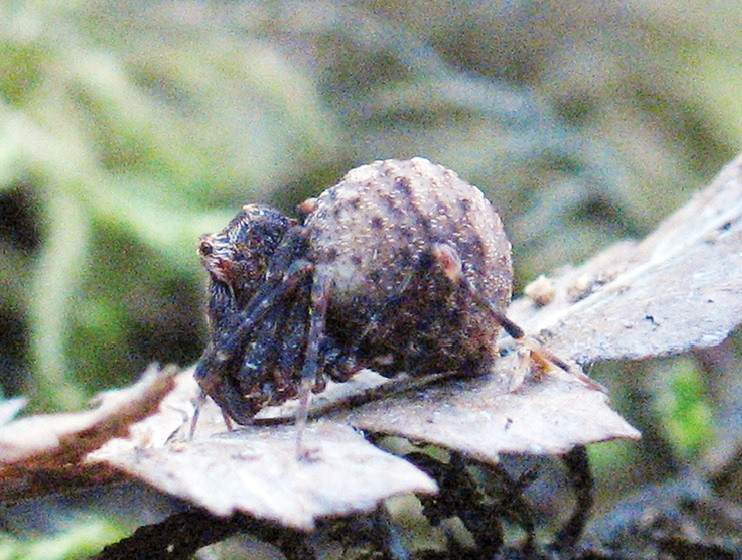

Scientific classification
- Domain: Eukaryota
- Kingdom: Animalia
- Phylum: Arthropoda
- Subphylum: Chelicerata
- Class: Arachnida
- Order: Araneae
- Infraorder: Araneomorphae
- Family: Archaeidae
- Genus: Zephyrarchaea
- Species: Z. vichickmani

Binomial name
- Zephyrarchaea vichickmani Rix & Harvey, 2012

= Zephyrarchaea vichickmani =

Species of spider

Zephyrarchaea vichickmani, the Central Highlands assassin spider, is a spider in the family Archaeidae. The species was first described by Michael G. Rix and Mark Harvey in 2012. It is endemic to Victoria, Australia.

== Taxonomy ==
The species' specific name is a patronym to honour Prof. Victor Hickman for his contributions to arachnology.

== Distribution and habitat ==
The spider is known to inhabit only temperate Nothofagus rainforest habitats in the Victorian Central Highlands, in leaf litter.

== Conservation ==
The species has a limited distribution, however, the abundance of protected habitat around its known range means that it probably does not require immediate conservation efforts.
