= Holarchaea globosa =

Scientific classification
- Domain: Eukaryota
- Kingdom: Animalia
- Phylum: Arthropoda
- Subphylum: Chelicerata
- Class: Arachnida
- Order: Araneae
- Infraorder: Araneomorphae
- Family: Anapidae
- Genus: Holarchaea
- Species: H. globosa

Binomial name
- Holarchaea globosa (Hickman, 1981)

Species of spider

Holarchaea globosa is one of only two described species in the spider genus Holarchaea. The species is endemic to Australia, specifically Tasmania.
