= Austrarchaea platnickorum =

Scientific classification
- Domain: Eukaryota
- Kingdom: Animalia
- Phylum: Arthropoda
- Subphylum: Chelicerata
- Class: Arachnida
- Order: Araneae
- Infraorder: Araneomorphae
- Family: Archaeidae
- Genus: Austrarchaea
- Species: A. platnickorum

Binomial name
- Austrarchaea platnickorum Rix & Harvey, 2011

Species of spider

Austrarchaea platnickorum is a species of spider in the family Archaeidae. It is endemic to Australia.
