= Zephyrarchaea marae =

Scientific classification
- Domain: Eukaryota
- Kingdom: Animalia
- Phylum: Arthropoda
- Subphylum: Chelicerata
- Class: Arachnida
- Order: Araneae
- Infraorder: Araneomorphae
- Family: Archaeidae
- Genus: Zephyrarchaea
- Species: Z. marae

Binomial name
- Zephyrarchaea marae Rix & Harvey, 2012

Species of spider

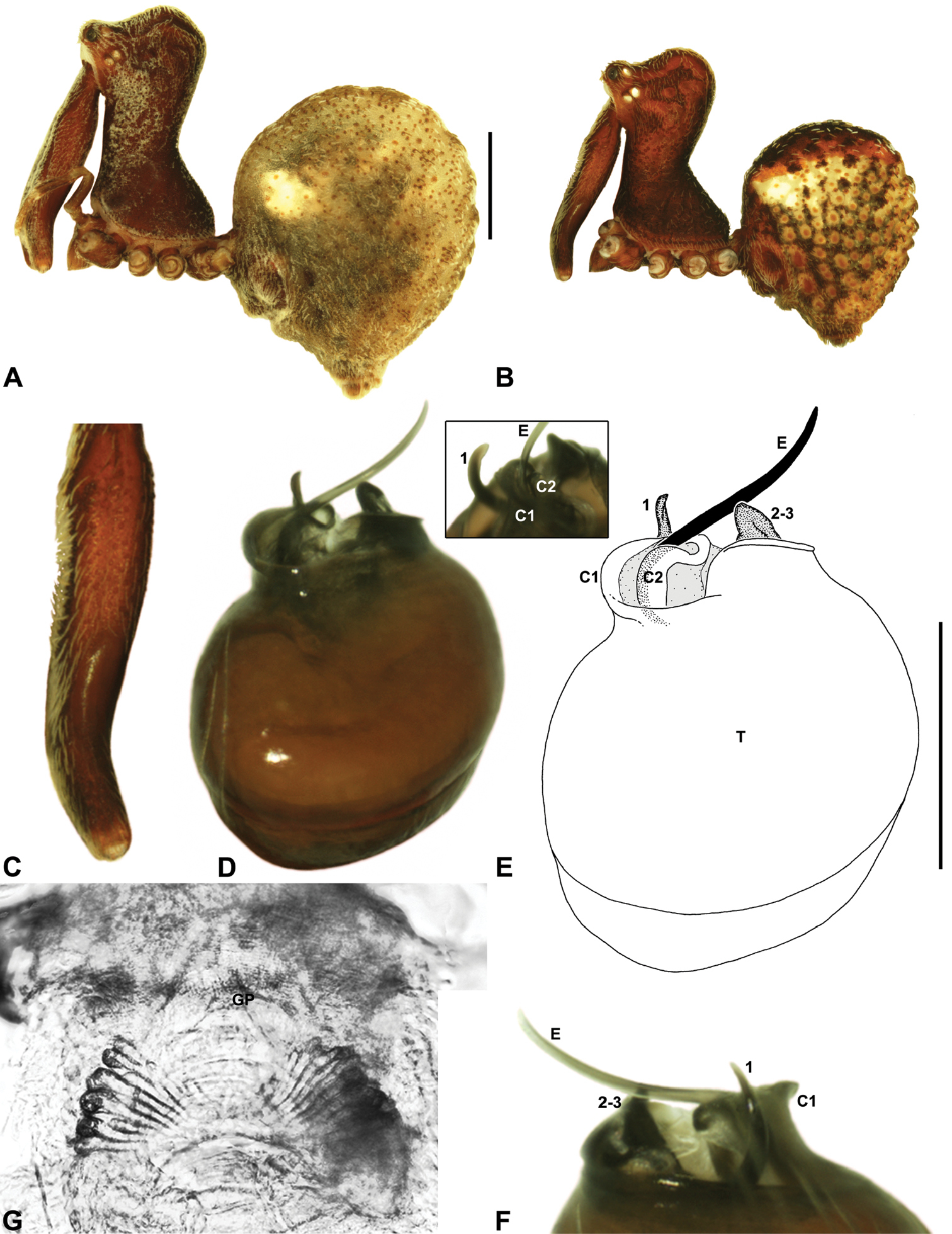
Zephyrarchaea marae anatomy

Zephyrarchaea marae, the West Gippsland assassin spider, is a spider in the family Archaeidae. The species was first described by Michael G. Rix and Mark Harvey in 2012. It is endemic to Victoria in Australia.

== Taxonomy ==
The species specific name is a patronym in honour of Dr. Māra Blosfeld.

== Description ==
The males are 3.03 mm long, while the females are 3.95 mm long.

== Distribution and habitat ==
The species is known only from temperate rainforest and mesic closed forest habitats Dandenong and Strzelecki Ranges of West Gippsland, south and southeast of Melbourne.

== Conservation ==
The species is found throughout several national parks, and does not require any conservation action.
