= Eriauchenus milajaneae =

Conservation status
- Data Deficient (IUCN 3.1)

Scientific classification
- Domain: Eukaryota
- Kingdom: Animalia
- Phylum: Arthropoda
- Subphylum: Chelicerata
- Class: Arachnida
- Order: Araneae
- Infraorder: Araneomorphae
- Family: Archaeidae
- Genus: Eriauchenus
- Species: E. milajaneae

Binomial name
- Eriauchenus milajaneae Wood and Schraff, 2018

Species of spider

Eriauchenus milajaneae is a species of spider in the family Archaeidae. It is endemic to Madagascar.

== Taxonomy ==
The holotype was collected in the Parc National Andohahela. The specific name is after Mila Jane Macaulay. The genus name has also been incorrectly spelt "Eriauchenius".

== Habitat and distribution ==
The spider is found in montane rainforest.
