= Eriauchenus rafohy =

Conservation status
- Endangered (IUCN 3.1)

Scientific classification
- Domain: Eukaryota
- Kingdom: Animalia
- Phylum: Arthropoda
- Subphylum: Chelicerata
- Class: Arachnida
- Order: Araneae
- Infraorder: Araneomorphae
- Family: Archaeidae
- Genus: Eriauchenus
- Species: E. rafohy

Binomial name
- Eriauchenus rafohy Wood and Schraff, 2018

Species of spider

Eriauchenus rafohy is a species of spider in the family Archaeidae. It is endemic to Madagascar. The genus name has also been incorrectly spelt "Eriauchenius".
