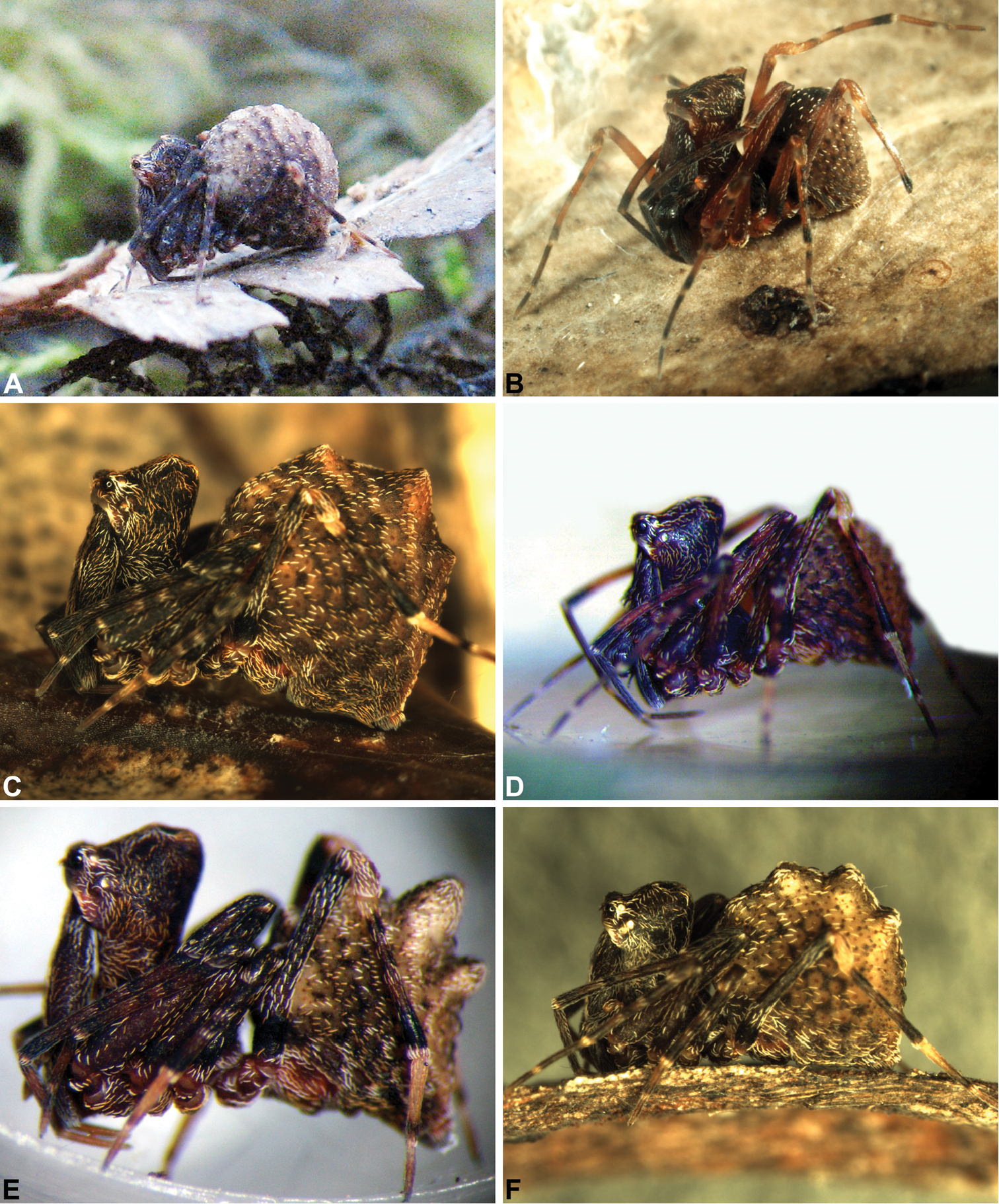

Scientific classification
- Kingdom: Animalia
- Phylum: Arthropoda
- Subphylum: Chelicerata
- Class: Arachnida
- Order: Araneae
- Infraorder: Araneomorphae
- Family: Archaeidae
- Genus: Zephyrarchaea; Rix & Harvey, 2012

Type species
- Austrarchaea mainae (Platnick, 1991)

Species
- 11; see text

= Zephyrarchaea =

Genus of spiders

Zephyrarchaea is a genus of Australian assassin spiders first described by Michael Gordon Rix & Mark Harvey in 2012 for nine new species and two that were formerly placed in the genus Austrarchaea. The name is based on the Latin zephyrus, meaning "west wind", referring to the western distribution in Australia and a preference for windy, coastal habitats by some species. It has been encountered in Western Australia, Victoria and South Australia.

== Differentiation from Austrarchaea ==
They are distinguished from Austrarchaea by a notably shorter carapace, the distribution of long hairs (setae) on the male chelicerae, and by the shape of the conductor of the male palpal bulb. The Australian Alps may be a barrier dividing the two genera.

== Species ==
As of April 2019 the genus contains eleven species:

- Zephyrarchaea austini Rix & Harvey, 2012 – Kangaroo Island, South Australia
- Zephyrarchaea barrettae Rix & Harvey, 2012 – Western Australia
- Zephyrarchaea grayi Rix & Harvey, 2012 – Victoria
- Zephyrarchaea janineae Rix & Harvey, 2012 – Western Australia
- Zephyrarchaea mainae (Platnick, 1991) – Western Australia; type
- Zephyrarchaea marae Rix & Harvey, 2012 – Victoria
- Zephyrarchaea marki Rix & Harvey, 2012 – Western Australia
- Zephyrarchaea melindae Rix & Harvey, 2012 – Western Australia
- Zephyrarchaea porchi Rix & Harvey, 2012 – Victoria
- Zephyrarchaea robinsi (Harvey, 2002) – Western Australia
- Zephyrarchaea vichickmani Rix & Harvey, 2012 – Victoria
