= Austrarchaea smithae =

Scientific classification
- Domain: Eukaryota
- Kingdom: Animalia
- Phylum: Arthropoda
- Subphylum: Chelicerata
- Class: Arachnida
- Order: Araneae
- Infraorder: Araneomorphae
- Family: Archaeidae
- Genus: Austrarchaea
- Species: A. smithae

Binomial name
- Austrarchaea smithae Rix & Harvey, 2011

Species of spider

Austrarchaea smithae is a species of spider in the family Archaeidae. It is commonly known as the Blue Mountains Assassin Spider as the holotype male was found at Mount Wilson in the Blue Mountains National Park. It was named to honour Dr Helen Smith. It is endemic to Australia.
