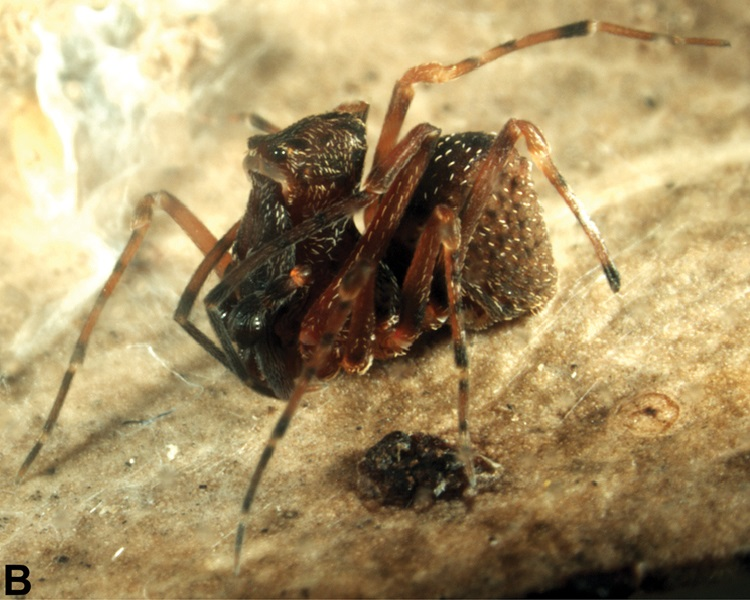

Conservation status
- Vulnerable (IUCN 3.1)

Scientific classification
- Kingdom: Animalia
- Phylum: Arthropoda
- Subphylum: Chelicerata
- Class: Arachnida
- Order: Araneae
- Infraorder: Araneomorphae
- Family: Archaeidae
- Genus: Zephyrarchaea
- Species: Z. barrettae

Binomial name
- Zephyrarchaea barrettae Rix & Harvey, 2012

= Zephyrarchaea barrettae =

Species of spider

Zephyrarchaea barrettae is a species of spider of the family Archaeidae. The Latin species name was chosen to honor Sarah Barrett, who first discovered assassin spiders in the Stirling Range National Park.

== Distribution and habitat ==
Zephyrarchaea barrettae is endemic to the South West Region in Western Australia. It has only been found on Talyuberlup Peak.
