= Austrarchaea clyneae =

Scientific classification
- Domain: Eukaryota
- Kingdom: Animalia
- Phylum: Arthropoda
- Subphylum: Chelicerata
- Class: Arachnida
- Order: Araneae
- Infraorder: Araneomorphae
- Family: Archaeidae
- Genus: Austrarchaea
- Species: A. clyneae

Binomial name
- Austrarchaea clyneae Rix & Harvey, 2011

Species of spider

Austrarchaea clyneae is a species of spider in the family Archaeidae. It is endemic to Australia. The etymology behind the species name comes from Australian naturalist and photographer Densey Clyne, who served as a great inspiration in the early life of Mark Stephen Harvey, who was responsible for finding and naming the species.

Its known habitat consists of the Australian rainforests of North-Eastern New South Wales in National Parks such as Mount Clunie National Park and Tooloom National Park.
