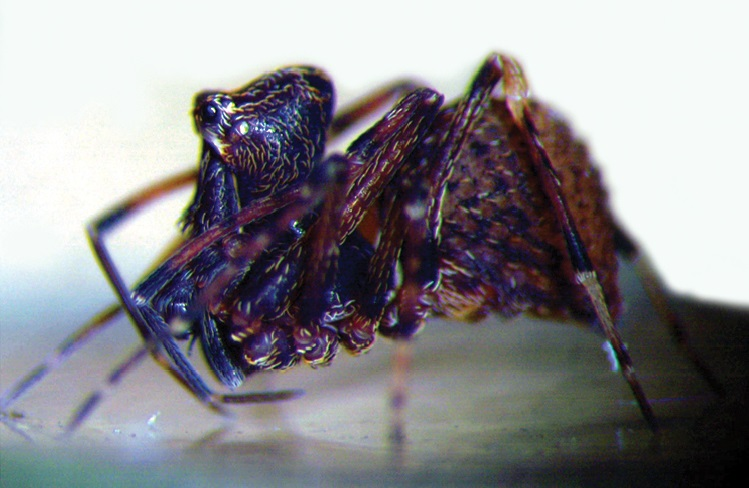

Scientific classification
- Domain: Eukaryota
- Kingdom: Animalia
- Phylum: Arthropoda
- Subphylum: Chelicerata
- Class: Arachnida
- Order: Araneae
- Infraorder: Araneomorphae
- Family: Archaeidae
- Genus: Zephyrarchaea
- Species: Z. marki

Binomial name
- Zephyrarchaea marki Rix & Harvey, 2012

= Zephyrarchaea marki =

Species of spider

Zephyrarchaea marki, the Cape Le Grand assassin spider, is a species of spider in the family Archaeidae, commonly known as the assassin spiders. Known only from Cape Le Grand National Park in Western Australia, the species was first described by Michael G. Rix and Mark Harvey in 2012. It is named after Mark Wojcieszek, who helped collect the initial specimens of this species. Z. marki is a small species of spider, with a total length of 2.77–2.79 mm (0.109–0.110 in) in adult males. In adult males, the cephalothorax is dark reddish-brown and the abdomen is mottled grey-brown and beige. The legs are tan brown with darker ring-like markings. The appearance of the female is unknown. The species is known to inhabit elevated leaf litter in a dense coastal thickets of Banksia speciosa. It has not yet been evaluated and assigned a conservation status by the International Union for Conservation of Nature. However, the species is endemic to a very small range and its only known population may be threatened by fire, dieback disease affecting Banksia, and climate change.

== Taxonomy ==
Zephyrarchaea marki was described by the arachnologists Michael G. Rix and Mark Harvey in 2012 on the basis of a male specimen collected from Cape Le Grand National Park, Western Australia, in 2009. The name of the genus is derived from the Latin 'zephyrus', meaning 'west wind', and refers to the windy coastal habitats that species of the genus inhabit. The specific epithet is in honour of Mark Wojcieszek, who helped collect the initial specimens of this species.

== Description ==
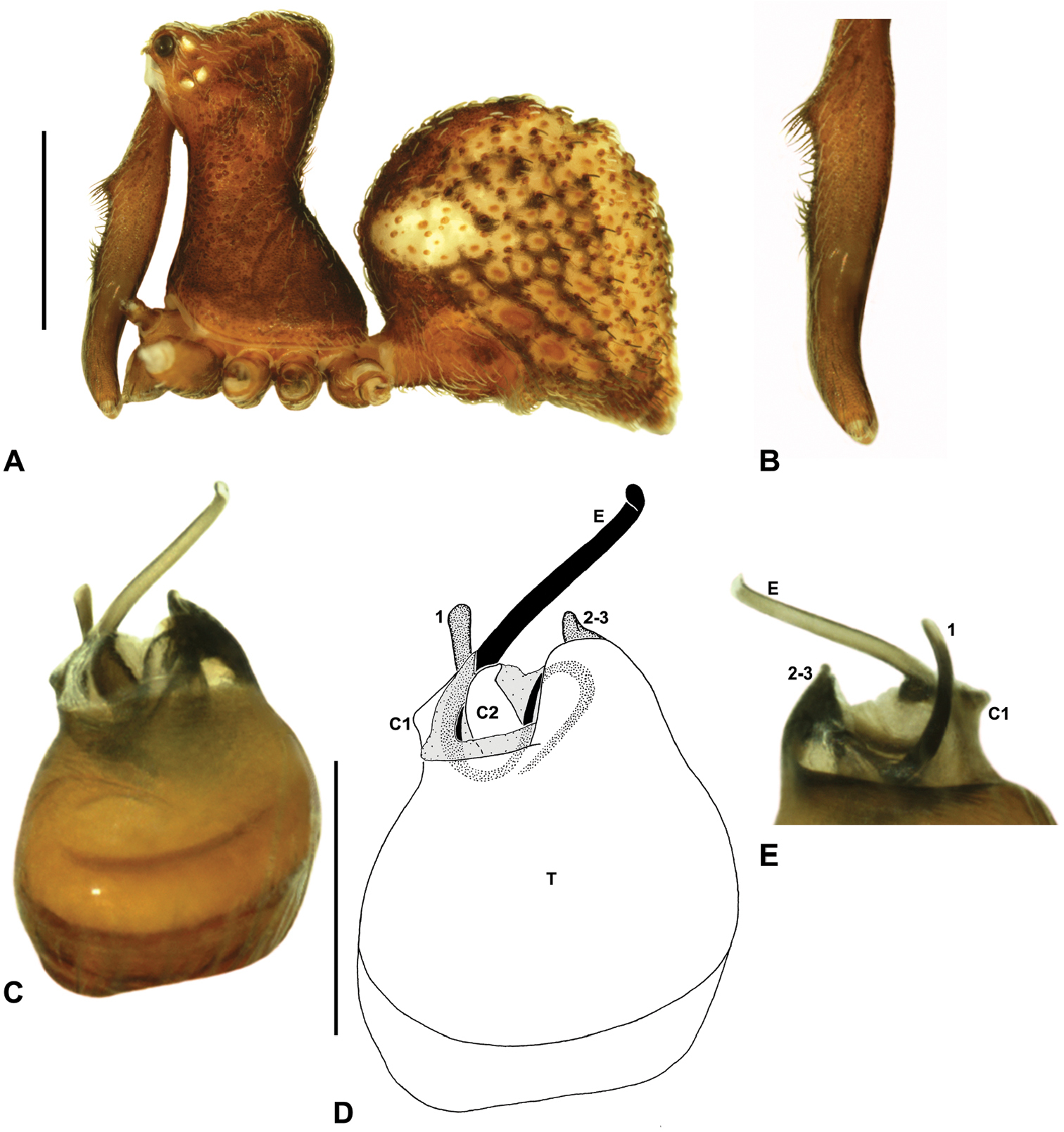
Anatomical characteristics of Z. marki

Like other species in its genus, Zephyrarchaea marki is a small species of spider, with a total length of 2.77–2.79 mm (0.109–0.110 in) in adult males. The cephalothorax is dark reddish-brown, while the abdomen is mottled grey-brown and beige, with reddish-brown dorsal scute and sclerites. The legs are tan brown with darker ring-like markings.

The "neck" is 0.56 mm (0.022 in) wide, with the highest point of the pars cephalica (portion of the cephalothorax between the front radial furrows) approaching the posterior third of the head. The carapace is short, measuring 1.03 mm (0.041 in) long, 1.69 mm (0.067 in) tall, and 1.00 mm (0.039 in) wide. It has a pronounced concave depression anterior to the highest point of the pars cephalica. The "head" is not strongly elevated dorsally; the post-ocular ratio, the length of the "head" posterior to the anterior median eyes (AME) relative to the dorsal elevation of the pars cephalica above the level of the AME, is 0.21. The chelicerae have proximal tufts and an additional comb of accessory setae on front face of the paturon. The abdomen is 1.64 mm (0.065 in) long and 1.13 mm (0.044 in) wide, and almost spherical when viewed from the side. It lacks hump-like tubercles along its back but has highly flattened mound-like vestiges. The dorsal scutes are fused anteriorly to the epigastric sclerites, extending posteriorly to cover nearly anterior two-thirds of dorsal abdomen. Pedipalps are pyriform (pear-shaped) when unexpanded, with a broad, distally curved embolus supported by conductor sclerites 1 and 2. Tegular sclerite 1 extends horizontally and is strongly curved in when viewed prolaterally, with a flattened, broadly rounded, paddle-shaped apex. Tegular sclerites 2 and 3 project beyond the retro-distal rim of the tegulum. The femur of leg 1 is 2.00 mm (0.08 in) long; the ratio of this femur and the carapace is 1.95. The appearance of the female has not been described.

Zephyrarchaea spiders have relatively uniform and cryptic coloration, generally only showing subtle intraspecific variation in abdominal patterning. Z. marki can be distinguished from Z. janineae and Z. mainae by the absence of dorsal hump-like tubercles on the abdomen, and from Z. marae and Z. vichickmani by the presence of a proximal tuft of accessory setae on the male chelicerae. Z. barrettae and Z. melindae differ in the shape of tegular sclerites 2 and 3; these project well beyond the retro-distal rim of the tegulum in Z. marki. Z. porchi has a smaller, less protuberant proximal bulge on the male chelicerae.

== Distribution and conservation ==
The species is known only from its type locality of Thistle Cove at Cape Le Grand National Park. Collected specimens were found in elevated leaf litter in a dense coastal thickets of Banksia speciosa, behind a beach.

Zephyrarchaea marki has not yet been evaluated and assigned a conservation status by the International Union for Conservation of Nature. However, the species is endemic to a very small range and its only known population may be threatened by fire, dieback disease affecting Banksia, and climate change.
