= Eriauchenus lukemacaulayi =

Conservation status
- Vulnerable (IUCN 3.1)

Scientific classification
- Domain: Eukaryota
- Kingdom: Animalia
- Phylum: Arthropoda
- Subphylum: Chelicerata
- Class: Arachnida
- Order: Araneae
- Infraorder: Araneomorphae
- Family: Archaeidae
- Genus: Eriauchenus
- Species: E. lukemacaulayi

Binomial name
- Eriauchenus lukemacaulayi Wood and Schraff, 2018

Species of spider

Eriauchenus lukemacaulayi is a species of spider in the family Archaeidae. It is endemic to Madagascar.

== Taxonomy ==
The holotype was collected by Hannah Wood in the Parc National Andrigitra. The specific name is to honor Dr. Luke Macaulay. The genus name has also been incorrectly spelt "Eriauchenius".

== Habitat and distribution ==
The spider is found primarily in rainforests.
