= Madagascarchaea gracilicollis =

Scientific classification
- Domain: Eukaryota
- Kingdom: Animalia
- Phylum: Arthropoda
- Subphylum: Chelicerata
- Class: Arachnida
- Order: Araneae
- Infraorder: Araneomorphae
- Family: Archaeidae
- Genus: Madagascarchaea
- Species: M. gracilicollis

Binomial name
- Madagascarchaea gracilicollis (Millot, 1948)
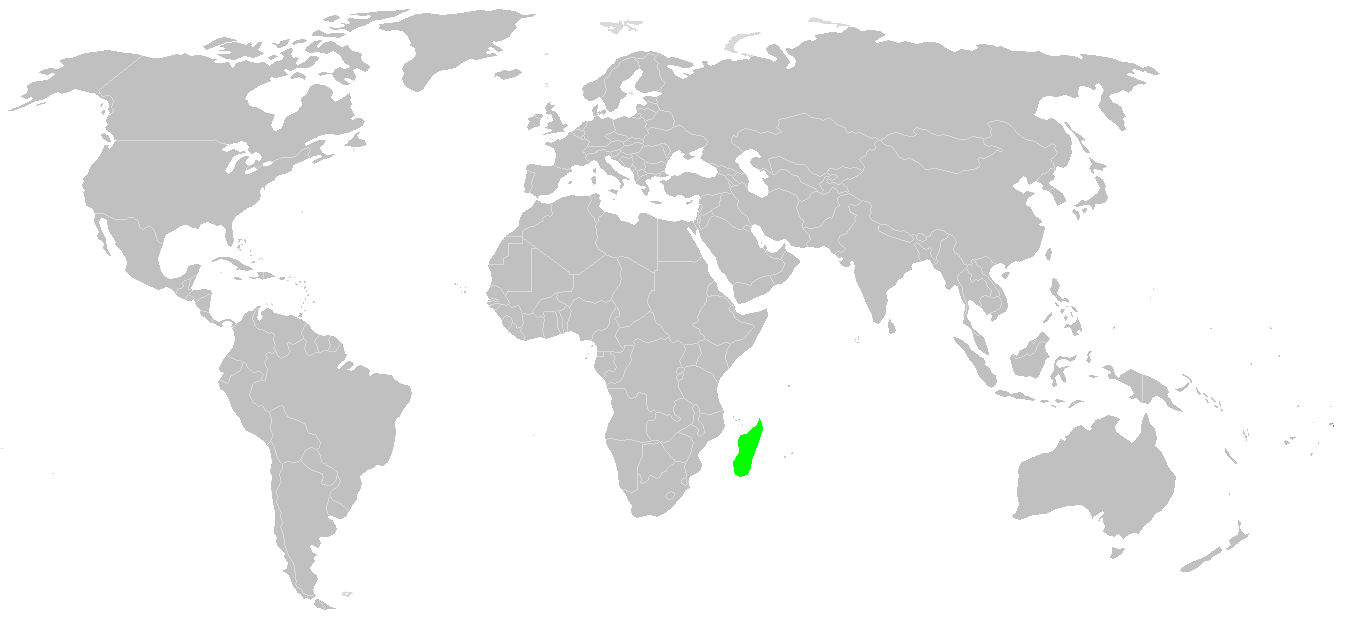

Synonyms
- Archaea gracilicollis Millot, 1948; Eriauchenius gracilicollis (Millot, 1948)

Species of spider

Madagascarchaea gracilicollis is a member of the family Archaeidae, assassin spiders. It is merely 2 mm long and catches other spiders with venomous fangs at the end of its hugely elongated jaws (chelicerae).

These animals normally run upside down.

== Etymology ==
From Latin gracilis "slender" and collum "neck".

== Distribution ==
This species is endemic to Madagascar.
