= Austrarchaea binfordae =

Scientific classification
- Domain: Eukaryota
- Kingdom: Animalia
- Phylum: Arthropoda
- Subphylum: Chelicerata
- Class: Arachnida
- Order: Araneae
- Infraorder: Araneomorphae
- Family: Archaeidae
- Genus: Austrarchaea
- Species: A. binfordae

Binomial name
- Austrarchaea binfordae Rix & Harvey, 2011

Species of spider

Austrarchaea binfordae is a species of spider in the genus Austrarchaea. It was described by Rix & Harvey in 2011 after being identified near Wauchope in New South Wales, Australia. It is named for the US arachnologist, Greta Binford.
