= Eriauchenus goodmani =

Conservation status
- Data Deficient (IUCN 3.1)

Scientific classification
- Domain: Eukaryota
- Kingdom: Animalia
- Phylum: Arthropoda
- Subphylum: Chelicerata
- Class: Arachnida
- Order: Araneae
- Infraorder: Araneomorphae
- Family: Archaeidae
- Genus: Eriauchenus
- Species: E. goodmani

Binomial name
- Eriauchenus goodmani Wood and Schraff, 2018

Species of spider

Eriauchenius goodmani is a species of spider in the family Archaeidae. It is endemic to Madagascar.

== Taxonomy ==
The holotype was collected by Steven Goodman in the Réserve Naturelle Intégrale d’Andohahela. It is named after Dr. Steven Goodman, who collected the specimens. The genus name has also been incorrectly spelt "Eriauchenius".

== Habitat and distribution ==
The spider is found in rainforest.
