= Eriauchenus andriamanelo =

Conservation status
- Least Concern (IUCN 3.1)

Scientific classification
- Domain: Eukaryota
- Kingdom: Animalia
- Phylum: Arthropoda
- Subphylum: Chelicerata
- Class: Arachnida
- Order: Araneae
- Infraorder: Araneomorphae
- Family: Archaeidae
- Genus: Eriauchenus
- Species: E. andriamanelo

Binomial name
- Eriauchenus andriamanelo Wood and Schraff, 2018

Species of spider

Eriauchenus andriamanelo is a species of spider in the family Archaeidae. It is endemic to Madagascar.

== Taxonomy ==
The holotype was collected by Hannah Wood and Nikolaj Schraff in the Montagne d'Ambre National Park. The specific name commemorates King Andriamanelo, the founder of the Merina Kingdom. The genus name has also been incorrectly spelt "Eriauchenius".

== Habitat and distribution ==
The spider is found from northern to central western Madagascar.
