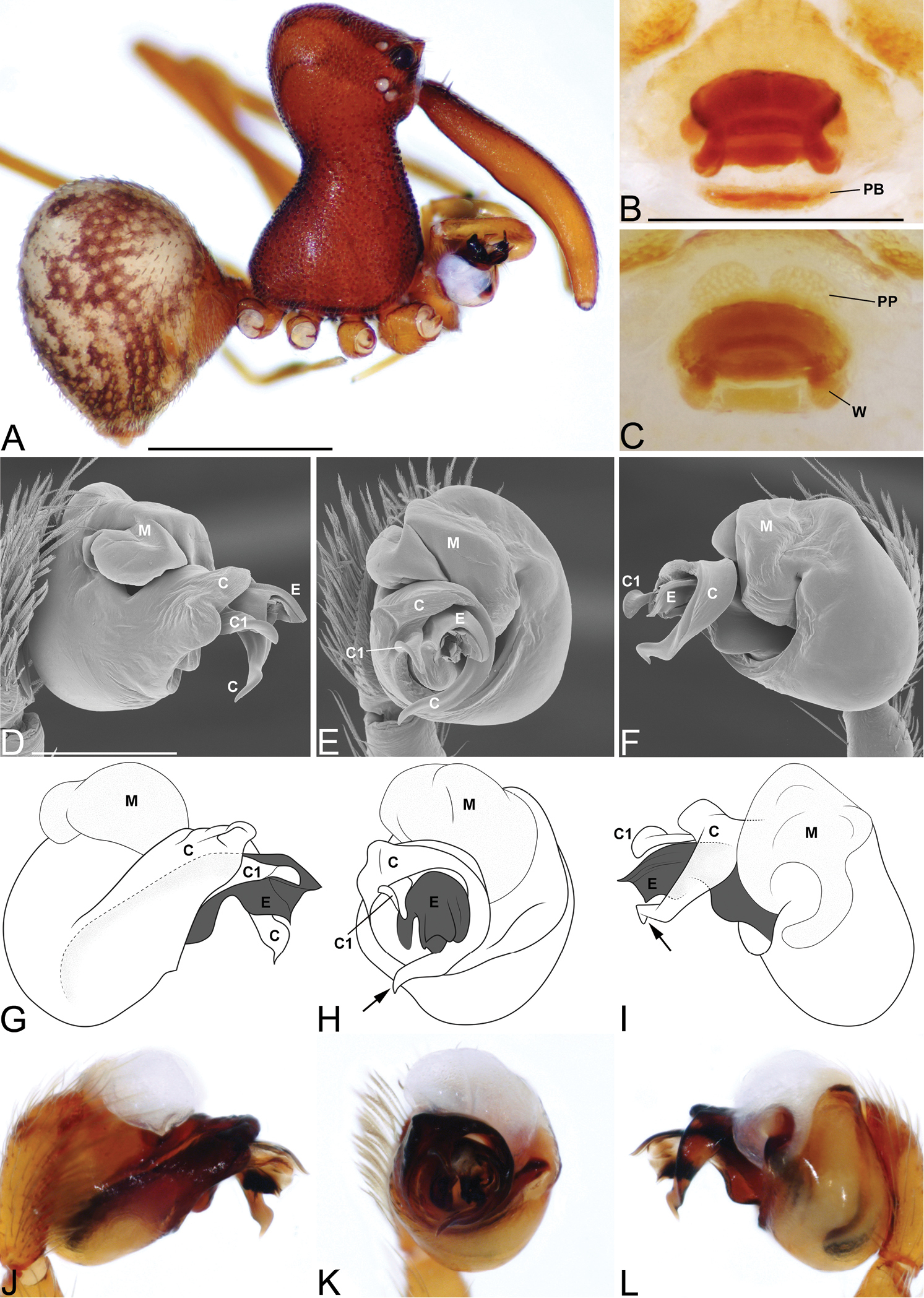

Conservation status
- Data Deficient (IUCN 3.1)

Scientific classification
- Kingdom: Animalia
- Phylum: Arthropoda
- Subphylum: Chelicerata
- Class: Arachnida
- Order: Araneae
- Infraorder: Araneomorphae
- Family: Archaeidae
- Genus: Eriauchenus
- Species: E. sama

Binomial name
- Eriauchenus sama Wood and Schraff, 2018

= Eriauchenus sama =

Species of spider

Eriauchenus sama is a species of spider in the family Archaeidae. It is endemic to Madagascar. The genus name has also been incorrectly spelt "Eriauchenius".
