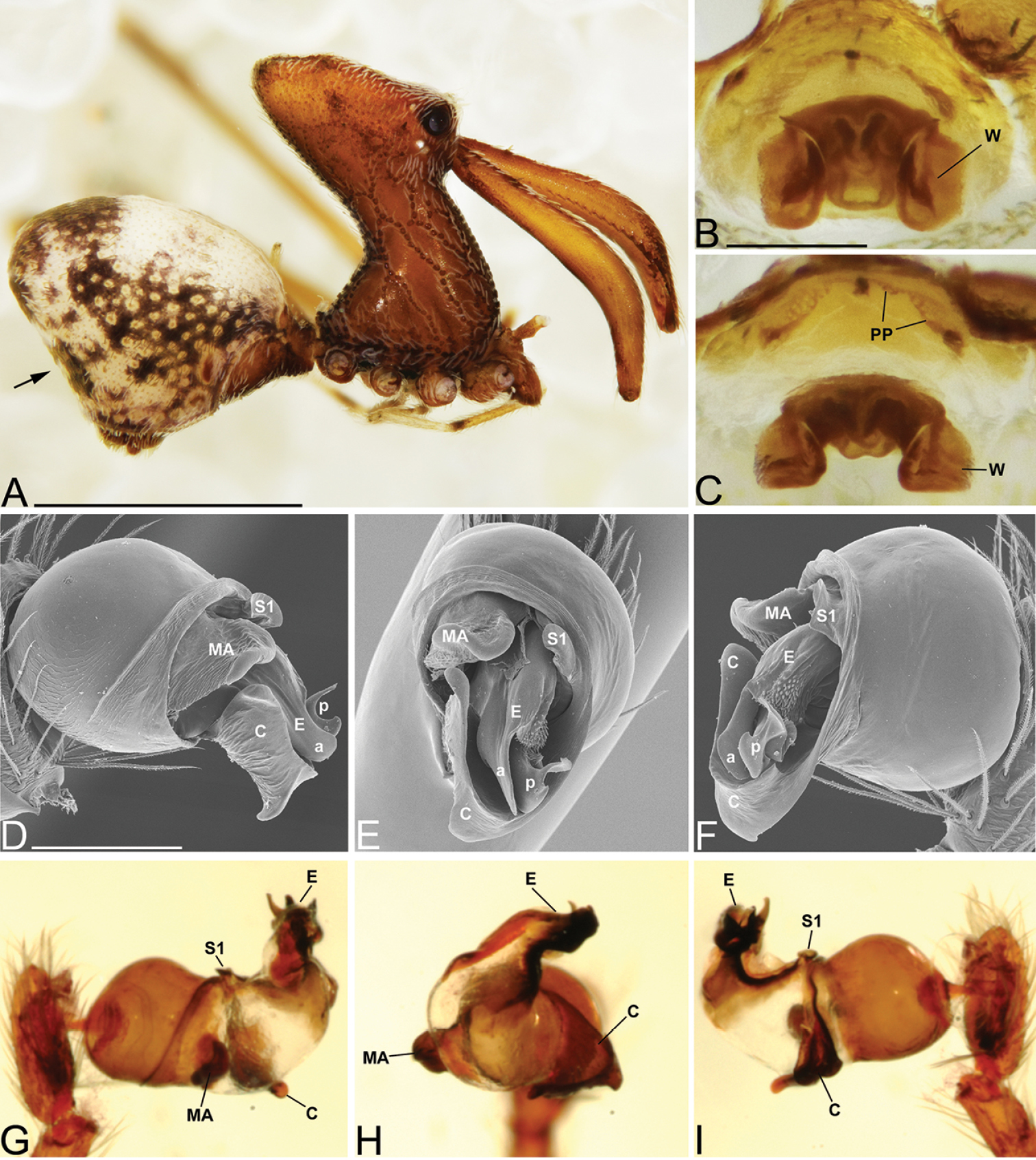
- Madagascarchaea moramora

Scientific classification
- Domain: Eukaryota
- Kingdom: Animalia
- Phylum: Arthropoda
- Subphylum: Chelicerata
- Class: Arachnida
- Order: Araneae
- Infraorder: Araneomorphae
- Family: Archaeidae
- Genus: Madagascarchaea; Wood & Scharff, 2018

Type species
- M. gracilicollis (Millot, 1948)

Species
- 18, see text

= Madagascarchaea =

Genus of spiders

Madagascarchaea is a genus of assassin spiders first described by H. M. Wood & N. Scharff in 2018.

== Species ==
As of April 2019 it contains eighteen species:

- Madagascarchaea ambre (Wood, 2008) — Madagascar
- Madagascarchaea anabohazo (Wood, 2008) — Madagascar
- Madagascarchaea borimontsina (Wood, 2008) — Madagascar
- Madagascarchaea fohy Wood & Scharff, 2018 — Madagascar
- Madagascarchaea gracilicollis (Millot, 1948) — Madagascar
- Madagascarchaea griswoldi (Wood, 2008) — Madagascar
- Madagascarchaea halambohitra (Wood, 2008) — Madagascar
- Madagascarchaea jeanneli (Millot, 1948) — Madagascar
- Madagascarchaea lavatenda (Wood, 2008) — Madagascar
- Madagascarchaea legendrei (Platnick, 1991) — Madagascar
- Madagascarchaea lotzi Wood & Scharff, 2018 — Madagascar
- Madagascarchaea moramora Wood & Scharff, 2018 — Madagascar
- Madagascarchaea namoroka (Wood, 2008) — Madagascar
- Madagascarchaea rabesahala Wood & Scharff, 2018 — Madagascar
- Madagascarchaea spiceri (Wood, 2008) — Madagascar
- Madagascarchaea tsingyensis (Lotz, 2003) — Madagascar
- Madagascarchaea vadoni (Millot, 1948) — Madagascar
- Madagascarchaea voronakely (Wood, 2008) — Madagascar
