= Toxins (journal) =

Scientific journal

- Discipline: Toxins, toxicology
- Language: English

Publication details
- History: 2009–present
- Publisher: MDPI
- Frequency: Monthly
- Open access: Yes
- Impact factor: 4.0 (2025)

Standard abbreviations
- ISO 4: Toxins (Basel)

Indexing
- ISSN: 2072-6651

Links
- Journal homepage

Toxins is a monthly open-access scientific journal covering toxins and toxicology published by MDPI.

The French Society on Toxinology, International Society for Mycotoxicology, Japanese Society of Mycotoxicology, and the European Uremic Toxins Work Group are affiliated with 'the journal.'

The journal covers toxinology and all kinds of toxins (biotoxins) from animals, microbes, and plants.

== Abstracting and indexing ==
The journal is abstracted and indexed in Index Medicus/MEDLINE/PubMed, Science Citation Index Expanded, and Scopus. According to the Journal Citation Reports, the journal has a 2025 impact factor of 4.0.
