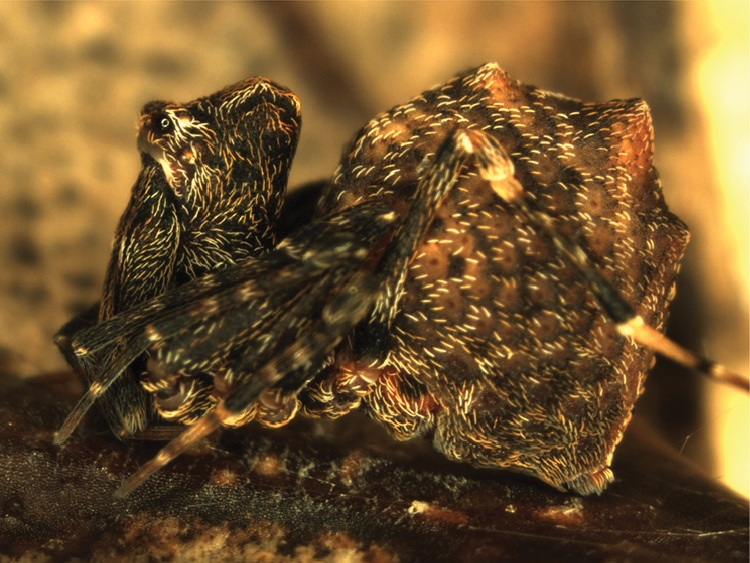

Scientific classification
- Kingdom: Animalia
- Phylum: Arthropoda
- Subphylum: Chelicerata
- Class: Arachnida
- Order: Araneae
- Infraorder: Araneomorphae
- Family: Archaeidae
- Genus: Zephyrarchaea
- Species: Z. janineae

Binomial name
- Zephyrarchaea janineae Rix & Harvey, 2012

= Zephyrarchaea janineae =

Species of spider

Zephyrarchaea janineae is a species of spider of the family Archaeidae. The Latin species name was chosen to honor Janine Wojcieszek who helped in discovering the first live specimens of the species in 2006. Zephyrarchaea janineae is endemic to the South West Region in Western Australia.
