= Burmesarchaea =

Burmesarchaea Temporal range: Cenomanian

Scientific classification
- Kingdom: Animalia
- Phylum: Arthropoda
- Subphylum: Chelicerata
- Class: Arachnida
- Order: Araneae
- Infraorder: Araneomorphae
- Family: Archaeidae
- Genus: †Burmesarchaea; Wunderlich, 2017

Species
- See text

Extinct genus of spiders

Burmesarchaea is a diverse extinct genus of spiders, placed in the family Archaeidae. The type species Burmesarchaea grimaldii was first described in 2003 and least 13 more species have been assigned to the genus. The genus has been exclusively found in Cretaceous Burmese amber, which is dated to 99 million years ago.

== Description ==
Burmesarchaea grimaldii is only known from a single male specimen preserved in amber. It is a small spider, with a body length of just under 2 mm (0.079 in). Characteristic of the family Archaeidae, the head region is raised up from the thorax, although without the distinctive "neck" found in other genera in the family. It is presumed to have eight eyes (the posterior median eye is not visible); the anterior median eye is the largest. The chelicerae are long relative to the body at about 0.8 mm (0.031 in), and project forward at about 45 degrees. The longest leg, the first, is 3.3 mm (0.13 in) long; the shortest, the third, is 1.7 mm (0.067 in) long. All the legs are without spines. The pedipalp has a large, rounded bulb with a spoon-shaped embolus and bent tegular apophysis.

== Taxonomy ==
A fossil spider, the type species holotype from Burmese amber, was first described by David Penny in 2003 as Afrarchaea grimaldii. The species name grimaldii honours David Grimaldi of the American Museum of Natural History for his contributions to the study of amber and for assistance with the specimen. In 2008, J. Wunderlich transferred A. grimaldii and Lacunauchenius speciosus to his newly erected genus, Burmesarchaea.

== Species ==
- B. alissa Wunderlich, 2017
- B. bilongapophyses Wunderlich, 2020
- B. caudata Wunderlich, 2017
- B. gibber Wunderlich, 2017
- B. gibberoides Wunderlich, 2017
- B. gibbosa Wunderlich, 2017
- B. grimaldii (Penney, 2003)
- B. pseudogibber Wunderlich, 2017
- B. pustulata Wunderlich, 2017
- B. speciosa (Wunderlich, 2008)
- B. spinicaput Wunderlich, 2025

In 2025 the taxonomic placements of many spider species, including fossil species in the family Archaeidae, were reconsidered. Five species within Burmesarchaea were moved to other genera.

- B. crassicaput Wunderlich, 2017 moved to Lacunauchenius
- B. crassichelae Wunderlich, 2017 moved to Lacunauchenius
- B. longicollum Wunderlich, 2017 moved to Planarchaea
- B. propinqua Wunderlich, 2017 moved to Lacunauchenius
- B. quadrata Wunderlich, 2017 moved to Lacunauchenius
