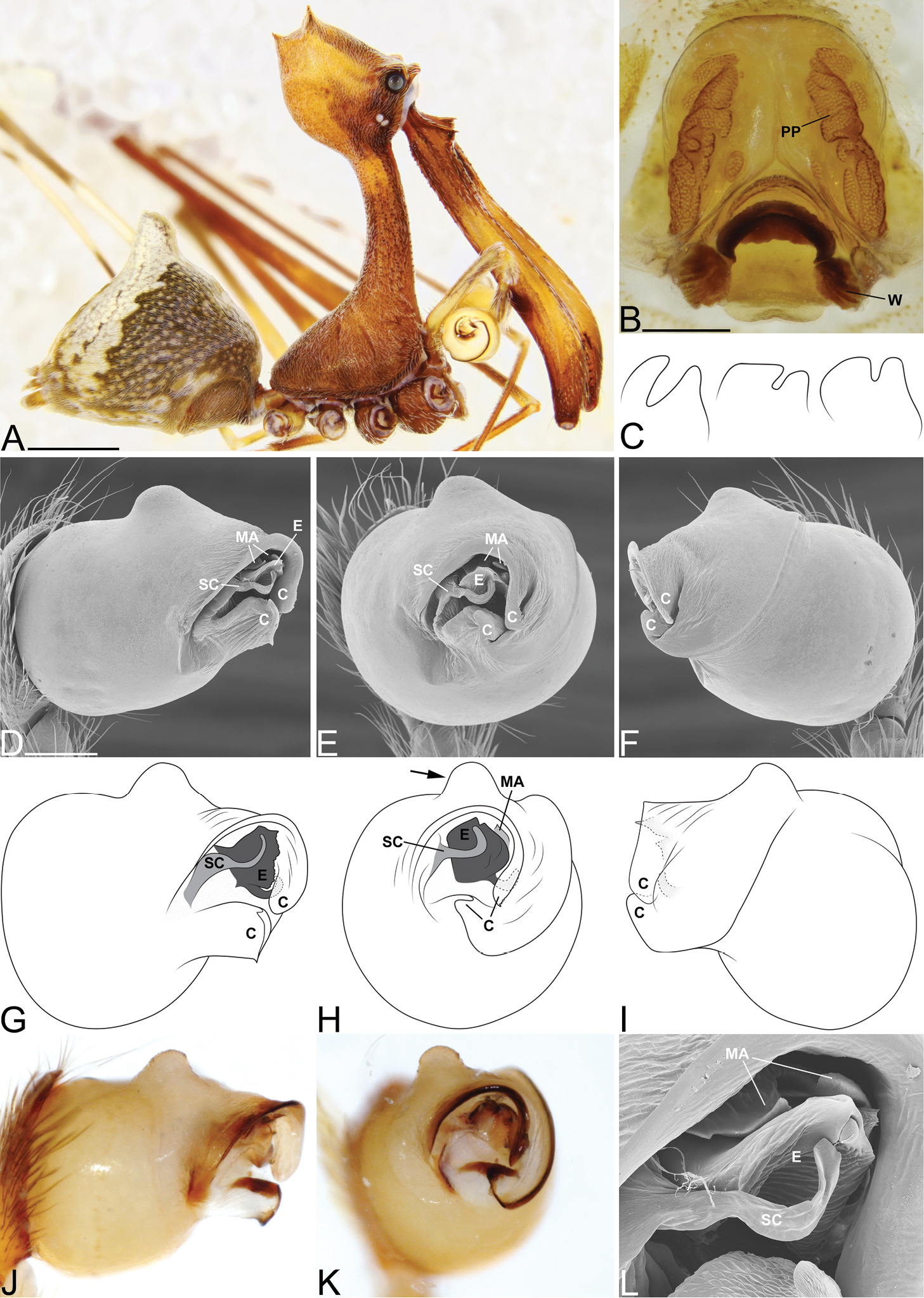
- Images of Eriachenius Workmani

Conservation status
- Least Concern (IUCN 3.1)

Scientific classification
- Kingdom: Animalia
- Phylum: Arthropoda
- Subphylum: Chelicerata
- Class: Arachnida
- Order: Araneae
- Infraorder: Araneomorphae
- Family: Archaeidae
- Genus: Eriauchenus
- Species: E. workmani

Binomial name
- Eriauchenus workmani Pickard-Cambridge, 1881

= Eriauchenus workmani =

Species of spider

Eriauchenus workmani is a species in the family Archaeidae. It is the type species of the genus Eriauchenus. It was first described by Octavius Pickard-Cambridge. It is endemic to Madagascar. The genus name has also been incorrectly spelt "Eriauchenius".
