= Eriauchenus =

Scientific classification
- Kingdom: Animalia
- Phylum: Arthropoda
- Subphylum: Chelicerata
- Class: Arachnida
- Order: Araneae
- Infraorder: Araneomorphae
- Family: Archaeidae
- Genus: Eriauchenus; O. Pickard-Cambridge, 1881

Type species
- E. workmani O. Pickard-Cambridge, 1881

Species
- 20, see text

Genus of spiders

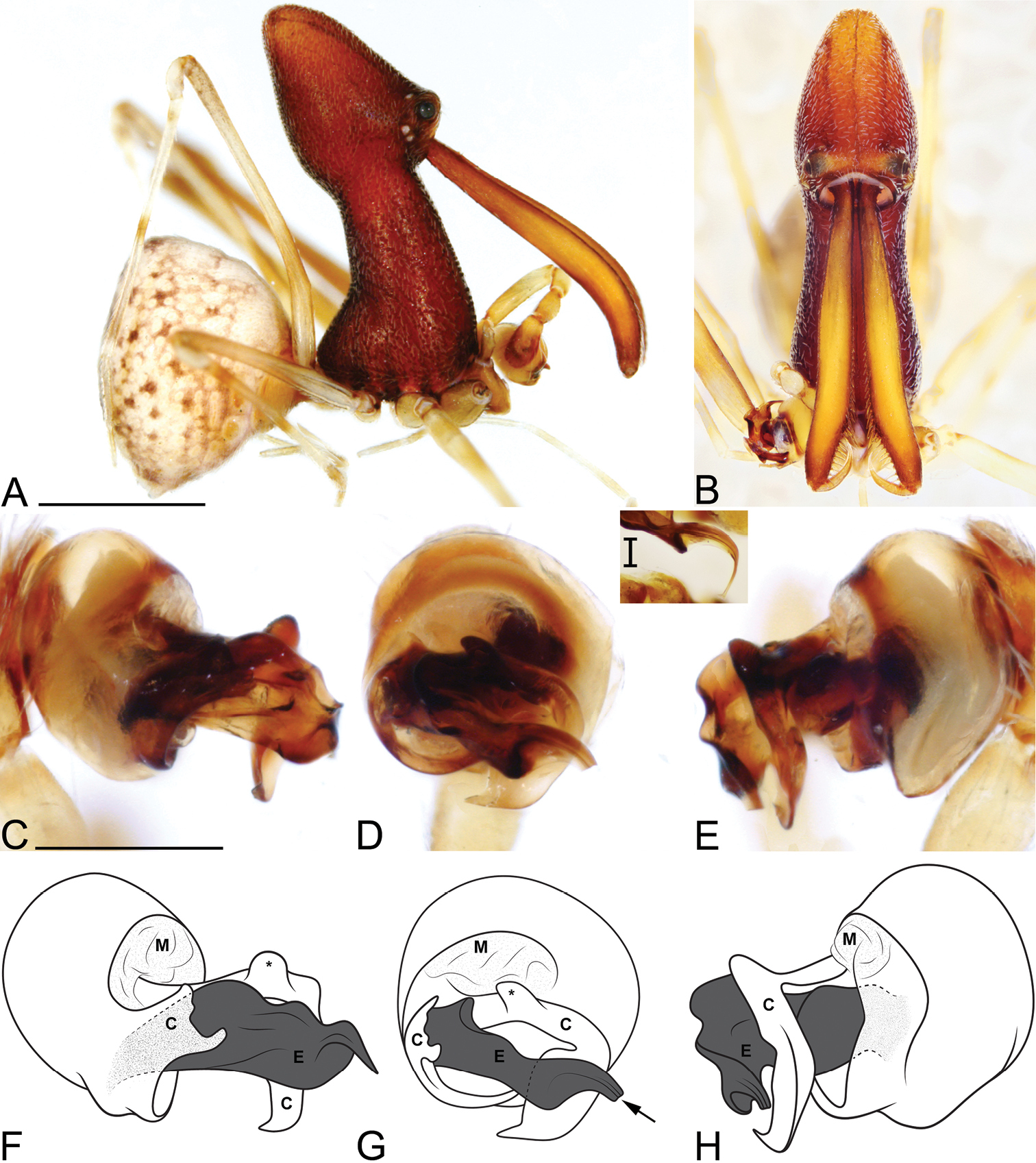
Eriauchenius pauliani

Eriauchenus is a genus of East African assassin spiders first described by O. Pickard-Cambridge in 1881. The genus name has been incorrectly spelt "Eriauchenius".

== Species ==
As of November 2021, it contained twenty species, all found on Madagascar:

- Eriauchenus andriamanelo Wood & Scharff, 2018 – Madagascar
- Eriauchenus andrianampoinimerina Wood & Scharff, 2018 – Madagascar
- Eriauchenus bourgini (Millot, 1948) – Madagascar
- Eriauchenus fisheri (Lotz, 2003) – Madagascar
- Eriauchenus goodmani Wood & Scharff, 2018 – Madagascar
- Eriauchenus harveyi Wood & Scharff, 2018 – Madagascar
- Eriauchenus lukemacaulayi Wood & Scharff, 2018 – Madagascar
- Eriauchenus mahariraensis (Lotz, 2003) – Madagascar
- Eriauchenus milajaneae Wood & Scharff, 2018 – Madagascar
- Eriauchenus milloti Wood & Scharff, 2018 – Madagascar
- Eriauchenus pauliani (Legendre, 1970) – Madagascar
- Eriauchenus rafohy Wood & Scharff, 2018 – Madagascar
- Eriauchenus ranavalona Wood & Scharff, 2018 – Madagascar
- Eriauchenus rangita Wood & Scharff, 2018 – Madagascar
- Eriauchenus ratsirarsoni (Lotz, 2003) – Madagascar
- Eriauchenus rixi Wood & Scharff, 2018 – Madagascar
- Eriauchenus sama Wood & Scharff, 2018 – Madagascar
- Eriauchenus workmani O. Pickard-Cambridge, 1881 (type) – Madagascar
- Eriauchenus wunderlichi Wood & Scharff, 2018 – Madagascar
- Eriauchenus zirafy Wood & Scharff, 2018 – Madagascar
