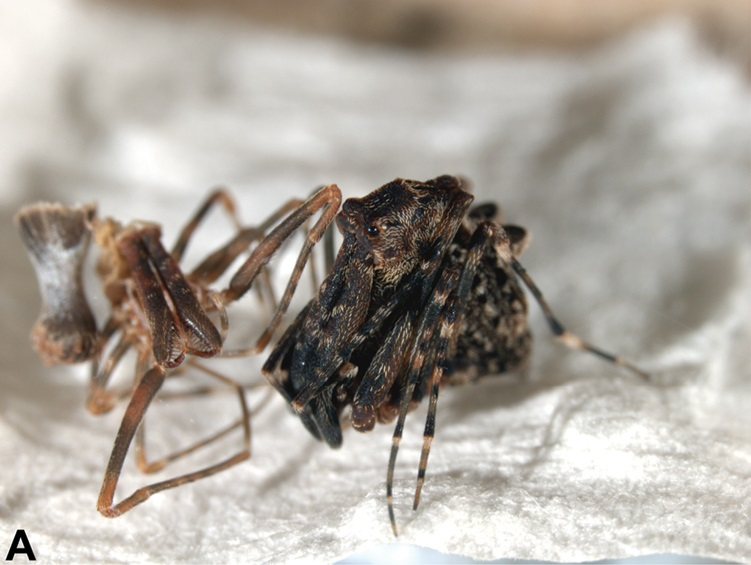
- A. griswoldi

Scientific classification
- Kingdom: Animalia
- Phylum: Arthropoda
- Subphylum: Chelicerata
- Class: Arachnida
- Order: Araneae
- Infraorder: Araneomorphae
- Family: Archaeidae
- Genus: Austrarchaea; Forster & Platnick, 1984

Type species
- A. nodosa (Forster, 1956)

Species
- 30, see text

= Austrarchaea =

Genus of spiders

Austrarchaea is a genus of Australian assassin spiders first described by Raymond Robert Forster & Norman I. Platnick in 1984. 25 species were described by Michael Gordon Rix and Mark Stephen Harvey in 2011, 2012, and 2024.

== Species ==
As of May 2024 it contains thirty species:

- Austrarchaea alani Rix & Harvey, 2011 – Australia (Queensland)
- Austrarchaea aleenae Rix & Harvey, 2011 – Australia (Queensland)
- Austrarchaea andersoni Rix, 2024 – Australia (Queensland)
- Austrarchaea binfordae Rix & Harvey, 2011 – Australia (New South Wales)
- Austrarchaea christopheri Rix & Harvey, 2011 – Australia (New South Wales)
- Austrarchaea clyneae Rix & Harvey, 2011 – Australia (Queensland, New South Wales)
- Austrarchaea cunninghami Rix & Harvey, 2011 – Australia (Queensland)
- Austrarchaea davidi Rix, 2022 – Australia (Queensland)
- Austrarchaea daviesae Forster & Platnick, 1984 – Australia (Queensland)
- Austrarchaea dianneae Rix & Harvey, 2011 – Australia (Queensland)
- Austrarchaea griswoldi Rix & Harvey, 2012 – Australia (Queensland)
- Austrarchaea harmsi Rix & Harvey, 2011 – Australia (Queensland)
- Austrarchaea helenae Rix & Harvey, 2011 – Australia (New South Wales)
- Austrarchaea hoskini Rix & Harvey, 2012 – Australia (Queensland)
- Austrarchaea judyae Rix & Harvey, 2011 – Australia (Queensland)
- Austrarchaea karenae Rix & Harvey, 2012 – Australia (Queensland)
- Austrarchaea laidlawae Rix, 2022 – Australia (Queensland)
- Austrarchaea mascordi Rix & Harvey, 2011 – Australia (New South Wales)
- Austrarchaea mcguiganae Rix & Harvey, 2011 – Australia (New South Wales)
- Austrarchaea milledgei Rix & Harvey, 2011 – Australia (New South Wales)
- Austrarchaea monteithi Rix & Harvey, 2011 – Australia (New South Wales)
- Austrarchaea nodosa (Forster, 1956) (type) – Australia (Queensland, New South Wales)
- Austrarchaea platnickorum Rix & Harvey, 2011 – Australia (New South Wales)
- Austrarchaea raveni Rix & Harvey, 2011 – Australia (Queensland)
- Austrarchaea smithae Rix & Harvey, 2011 – Australia (New South Wales)
- Austrarchaea tealei Rix & Harvey, 2012 – Australia (Queensland)
- Austrarchaea thompsoni Rix & Harvey, 2012 – Australia (Queensland)
- Austrarchaea wallacei Rix & Harvey, 2012 – Australia (Queensland)
- Austrarchaea westi Rix & Harvey, 2012 – Australia (Queensland)
- Austrarchaea woodae Rix & Harvey, 2012 – Australia (Queensland)
