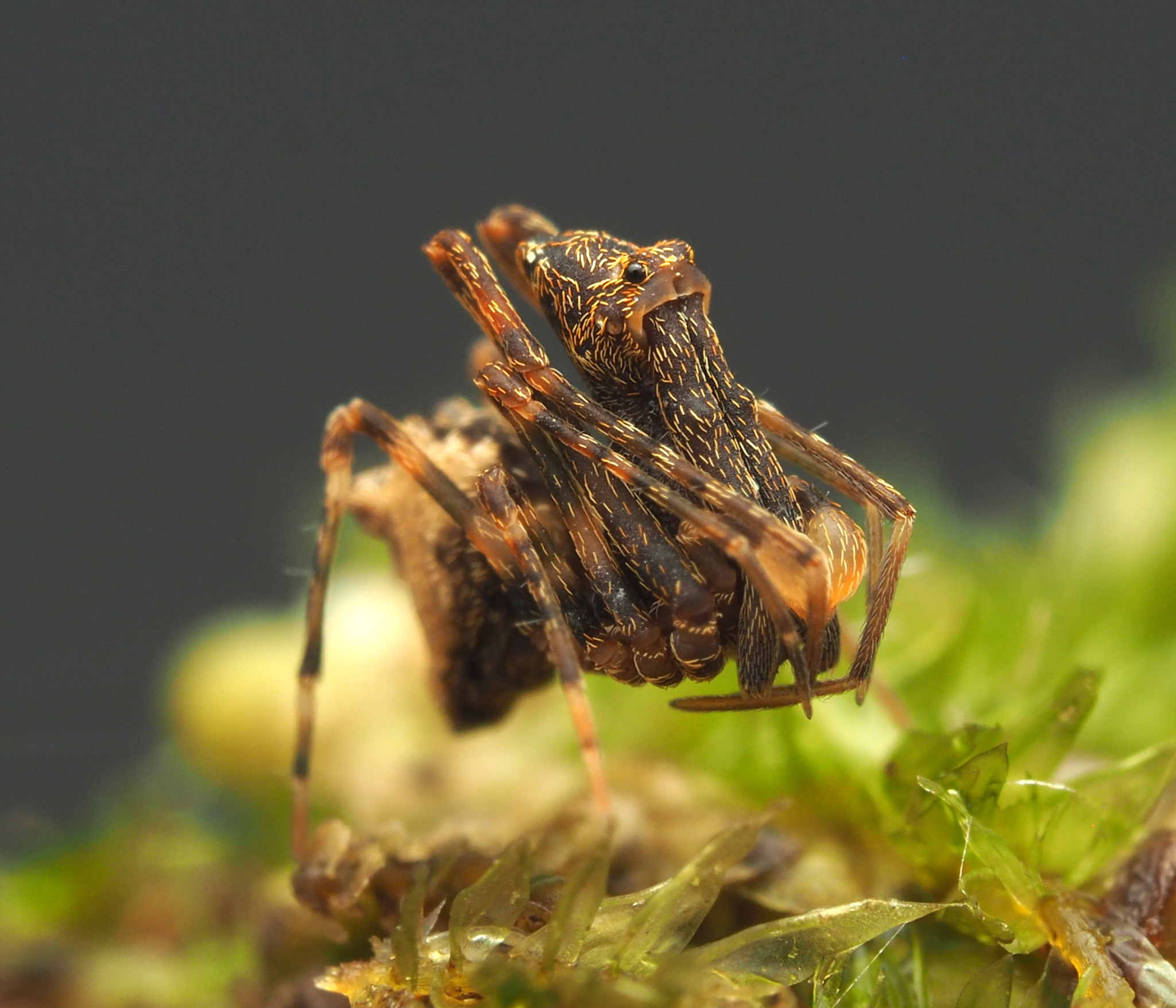
- Austrarchaea raveni
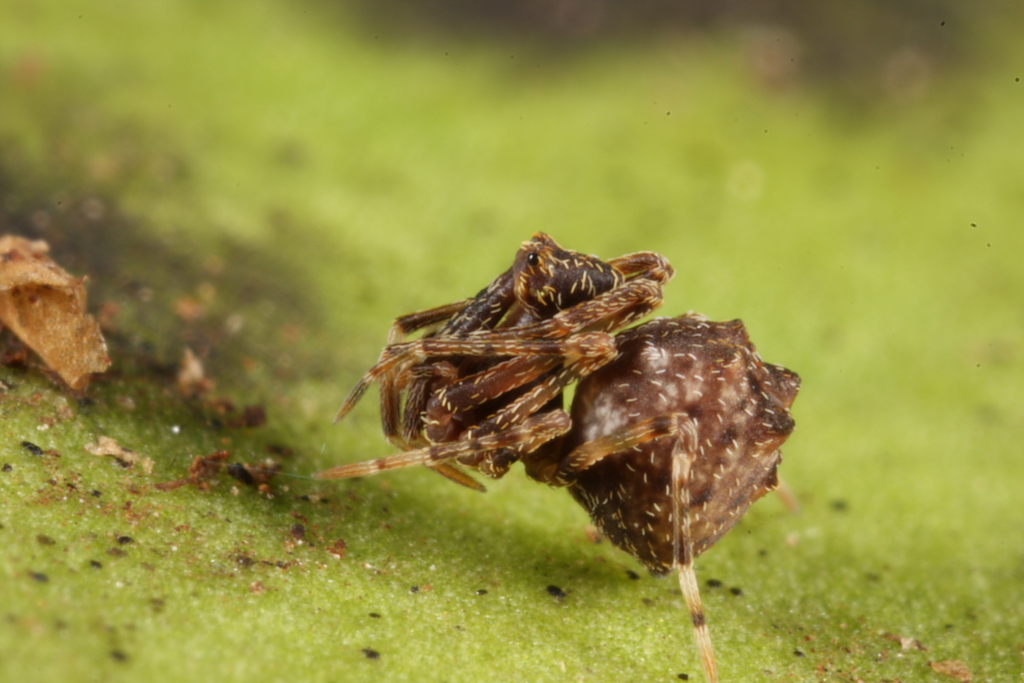
- Austrarchaea sp.

Scientific classification
- Kingdom: Animalia
- Phylum: Arthropoda
- Subphylum: Chelicerata
- Class: Arachnida
- Order: Araneae
- Infraorder: Araneomorphae
- Superfamily: Palpimanoidea
- Family: Archaeidae; C. L. Koch & Berendt, 1854

Diversity
- 5 genera, 90 species
- blue: reported countries (WSC)

= Archaeidae =

Assassin spiders Temporal range: Middle Jurassic–Recent

Family of spiders

Archaeidae, also known as assassin spiders and pelican spiders, is a spider family with about ninety described species in five genera. It contains small spiders, ranging from 2 to 8 millimetres (0.079 to 0.315 in) long, that prey exclusively on other spiders. They are unusual in that they have "necks", ranging from long and slender to short and thick. The name "pelican spider" refers to their elongated jaws and necks used to catch their prey. Living species of Archaeidae occur in South Africa, Madagascar, and Australia, with the sister family Mecysmaucheniidae occurring in southern South America and New Zealand.

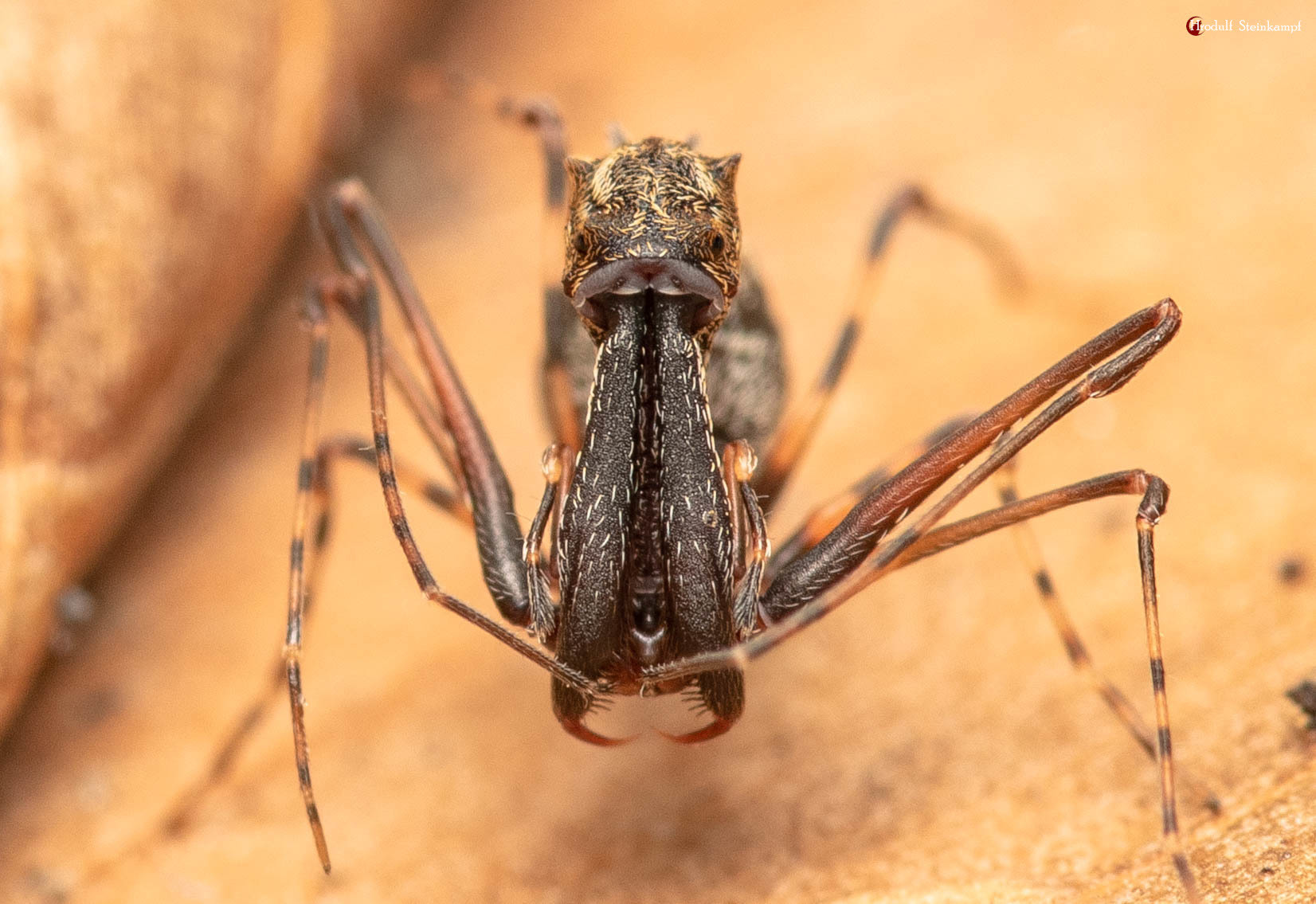
female Afrarchaea cornuta

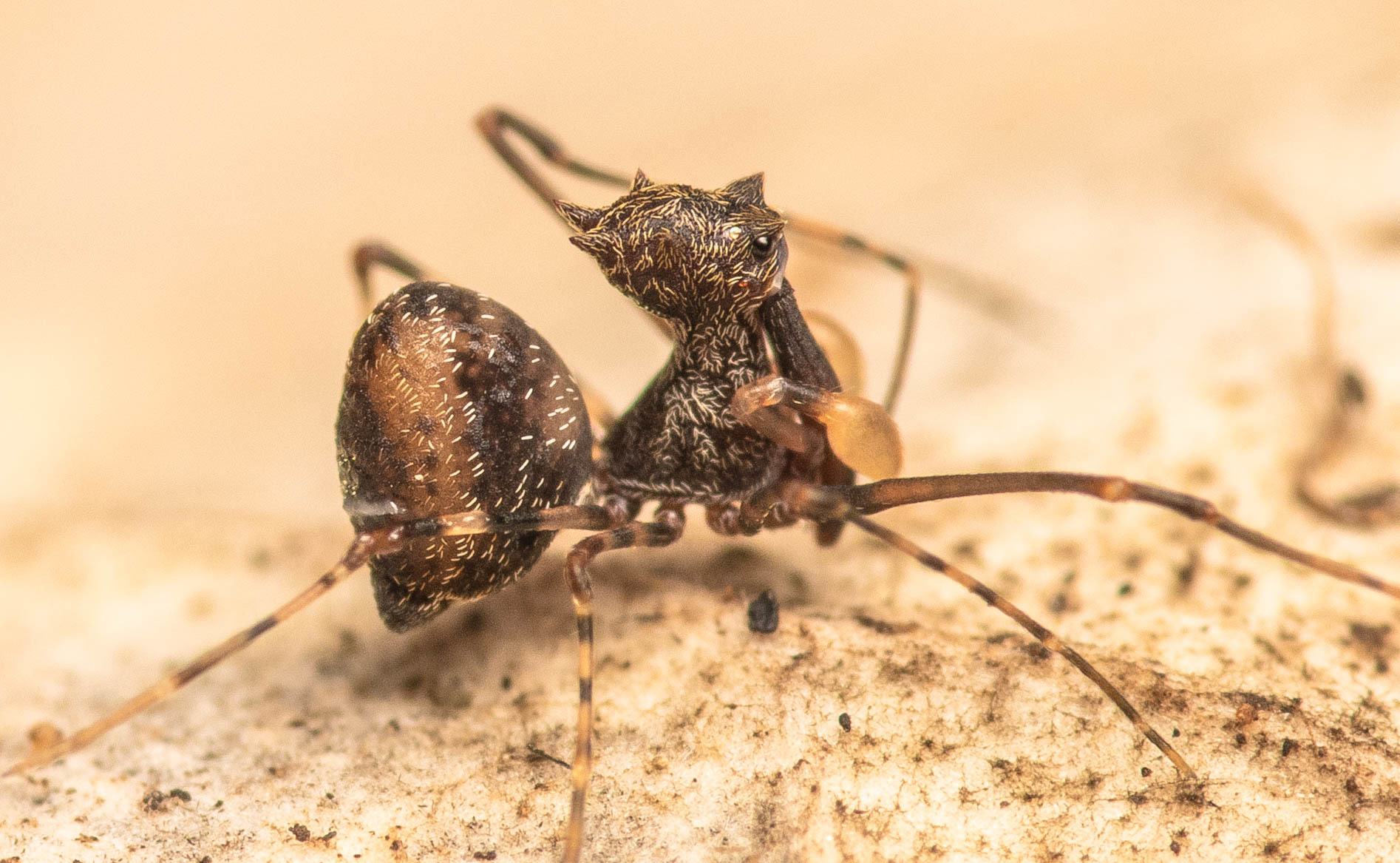
juvenile male Afrarchaea cornuta

Assassin spiders were first known from 40 million-year-old amber fossils which were found in Europe in the 1840s and were not known to have living varieties until 1881, when the first living assassin spider was found in Madagascar.

The fossil record of this family was first identified from Baltic amber dating to the Eocene, although many taxa from these deposits have been reassigned to Mecysmaucheniidae, Malkaridae, and Anapidae. Currently valid Baltic species include Archaea levigata and Archaea paradoxa. In 2003, Afrarchaea grimaldii was described from Cretaceous Burmese amber aged between 88 and 95 million years, extending the record of this group considerably, the oldest fossil known of the group is Patarchaea muralis from the Middle Jurassic (Oxfordian/Callovian) of Inner Mongolia, China.

== Taxonomy ==
The family Archaeidae was erected in 1854 by C. L. Koch and G. K. Berendt for one genus, Archaea, initially with three extinct species, all found in amber from the Baltic Sea or Bitterfeld in Saxony-Anhalt, Germany. No living species are placed in this genus.

== Genera ==
As of October 2025, this family includes six genera:

=== Extant genera ===
- Afrarchaea Forster & Platnick, 1984 – South Africa
- Austrarchaea Forster & Platnick, 1984 – Australia
- Eriauchenus O. Pickard-Cambridge, 1881 – Madagascar
- Madagascarchaea Wood & Scharff, 2018 – Madagascar
- Zephyrarchaea Rix & Harvey, 2012 – Australia

=== Fossils ===
Fossils found in amber, particularly from the Baltic and Myanmar (Burma), have been assigned to a number of extant and extinct genera placed in the family Archaeidae. The extinct species Burmesarchaea grimaldii (syn. Afrarchaea grimaldii) was found in Burmese amber dated to 88–95 Mya. Jurarchaea zherikhini Eskov, 1987 was previously considered a member of this family. Still, it is more likely a holarchaeid or a pararchaeid.

- †Archaea Koch and Berendt 1854 Baltic, Bitterfeld amber, Eocene
- †Archaemecys Saupe and Selden 2009 Charentese amber, France, Cenomanian
- †Baltarchaea Eskov 1992 Baltic amber, Eocene
- †Burmesarchaea Wunderlich 2008 Burmese amber, Myanmar, Cenomanian
- †Eomysmauchenius Wunderlich 2008 Burmese amber, Myanmar, Cenomanian
- †Myrmecarchaea Wunderlich 2004 Baltic amber, Eocene
- †Patarchaea Selden et al. 2008 Daohugou, China, Callovian
- †Saxonarchaea Wunderlich 2004 Baltic, Bitterfeld amber, Eocene

Fossils formerly assigned to Archaeidae

- †Eoarchaea Forster and Platnick 1984 now in family †Eoarchaeidae Wunderlich 2025
- †Lacunauchenius Wunderlich 2008 now in family †Lacunaucheniidae Wunderlich 2008
- †Planarchaea Wunderlich 2015 now in family †Planarchaeidae Wunderlich 2017

=== Phylogeny ===
A 2012 Bayesian phylogenetic analysis of 15 Archaeidae species, using combined molecular and morphological data, produced the cladogram shown below. Species representing modern genera found in Africa and Madagascar (Afrarchaea and Eriauchenius) were not resolved into monophyletic groups; Zephyrarchaea had not been split off from Austrarchaea. The species found in European amber formed a clade, whereas Burmesarchaea grimaldii, from Burmese amber, appeared to be basal to modern genera.

- Archaeidae
  - - †Burmesarchaea grimaldii
    - - Austrarchaea (including Zephyrarchaea)
      - Afrarchaea + Eriauchenius
  - - †Archaea paradoxa
    - - †Baltarchaea conica
      - - †Myrmecarchaea sp.
        - †Patarchaea muralis
