= Afrarchaea bergae =

Sabie Assassin Spider

Conservation status
- Least Concern (SANBI Red List)

Scientific classification
- Kingdom: Animalia
- Phylum: Arthropoda
- Subphylum: Chelicerata
- Class: Arachnida
- Order: Araneae
- Infraorder: Araneomorphae
- Family: Archaeidae
- Genus: Afrarchaea
- Species: A. bergae

Binomial name
- Afrarchaea bergae Lotz, 1996

Species of spider

Afrarchaea bergae is a species of spider of the genus Afrarchaea. It is endemic to South Africa.

== Distribution ==
Afrarchaea bergae has been recorded from Mpumalanga and Limpopo provinces in South Africa. The species is found ranging from 583 to 1,303 metres above sea level.

Known localities include Limpopo (Entabeni Forest Reserve) and Mpumalanga (Bergvliet Forest Station near Sabie, Crocodile River Bridge near Nelspruit, Kruger National Park, Mariepskop, Nelspruit, and Ohrigstad).

== Habitat ==
The species inhabits drier to riverine forests found in the Lowveld of eastern Mpumalanga and Limpopo provinces, within both Forest and Savanna biomes. Afrarchaea bergae has been sampled from humus and leaf litter, and notably has also been recorded from pine plantations, demonstrating some adaptability to modified habitats.

== Description ==
Afrarchaea bergae exhibits the characteristic features of the genus, including a greatly elevated cephalic region and elongated chelicerae. Both males and females are known for this species.

== Conservation status ==
Afrarchaea bergae is classified as Least Concern despite being known from fewer than 10 locations and having a relatively small distribution range. This classification is justified because the species can survive in pine plantations, which represent the main land use within its range, indicating some ecological flexibility.

The species is protected within several conservation areas including Entabeni State Forest, Kruger National Park, and Bergvliet State Forest Station. No specific conservation actions are recommended due to its stable status.
