= Afrarchaea kranskopensis =

Kranskop Assassin Spider

Scientific classification
- Kingdom: Animalia
- Phylum: Arthropoda
- Subphylum: Chelicerata
- Class: Arachnida
- Order: Araneae
- Infraorder: Araneomorphae
- Family: Archaeidae
- Genus: Afrarchaea
- Species: A. kranskopensis

Binomial name
- Afrarchaea kranskopensis Lotz, 1996

Species of spider

Afrarchaea kranskopensis is a species of spider of the genus Afrarchaea. It is endemic to South Africa.

== Etymology ==
The species name kranskopensis refers to its type locality in the Kranskop area of KwaZulu-Natal.

== Distribution ==
Afrarchaea kranskopensis is known only from the Kranskop area in KwaZulu-Natal province, South Africa. The species has an extremely restricted range of only 4 km², at an elevation of 1,209 metres above sea level.

== Habitat ==
The species was sampled from a forest area at Kranskop in 1940. The original forest habitat in the Kranskop area has since been significantly impacted by human activities.

== Description ==
Afrarchaea kranskopensis exhibits the characteristic features of the genus, including a greatly elevated cephalic region and elongated chelicerae. Currently, only females are known; the male remains undescribed.

== Conservation status ==
Afrarchaea kranskopensis is classified as Data Deficient for Taxonomic reasons (DDT) by the South African National Biodiversity Institute. The species' status remains unclear, and additional sampling is needed to collect males and determine the species' current range and population status.

A significant concern is that habitat in the Kranskop area has been extensively lost to afforestation, crop cultivation, and urban development since the species was first collected in 1940. This habitat transformation represents a major threat to the species' survival.
