= Afrarchaea ansieae =

Ansie’s Assassin Spider

Scientific classification
- Kingdom: Animalia
- Phylum: Arthropoda
- Subphylum: Chelicerata
- Class: Arachnida
- Order: Araneae
- Infraorder: Araneomorphae
- Family: Archaeidae
- Genus: Afrarchaea
- Species: A. ansieae

Binomial name
- Afrarchaea ansieae Lotz, 2015

Species of spider

Afrarchaea ansieae is a species of spider of the genus Afrarchaea. It is endemic to South Africa.

== Etymology ==
The species is named after South African arachnologist Ansie Dippenaar-Schoeman.

== Distribution ==
Afrarchaea ansieae is known only from its type locality in KwaZulu-Natal Province, South Africa. The species has been recorded from Hlabisa in the iSimangaliso Wetland Park, specifically from the Eastern Shores Nature Reserve.

== Habitat ==
The species inhabits grassland environments within the Indian Ocean Coastal Belt Biome. It has been collected from litter at the base of grass tussocks.

== Description ==
Afrarchaea ansieae displays the typical characteristics of the genus Afrarchaea, with a greatly elevated cephalic region and elongated chelicerae. Both males and females are known for this species.

== Conservation status ==
Afrarchaea ansieae is classified as Data Deficient by the South African National Biodiversity Institute. The species has an extremely restricted range, at an elevation of 5 metres above sea level.

The species may occur in additional sites within the iSimangaliso Wetland Park, but further sampling is required to determine its true range and population status. The species is currently protected within the iSimangaliso Wetlands Park, Eastern Shores Nature Reserve.
