= Afrarchaea woodae =

Wood's Assassin Spider

Conservation status
- Endangered (SANBI Red List)

Scientific classification
- Kingdom: Animalia
- Phylum: Arthropoda
- Subphylum: Chelicerata
- Class: Arachnida
- Order: Araneae
- Infraorder: Araneomorphae
- Family: Archaeidae
- Genus: Afrarchaea
- Species: A. woodae

Binomial name
- Afrarchaea woodae Lotz, 2006

Species of spider

Afrarchaea woodae is a species of spider of the genus Afrarchaea. It is endemic to South Africa.

== Distribution ==
Afrarchaea woodae is restricted to the Eastern Cape province of South Africa, where it is known from only two coastal locations. The species was found from elevations ranging from 35 to 52 metres above sea level.

Known localities include Eastern Cape (Komga, Kei River Mouth; Cwebe Nature Reserve).

== Habitat ==
The species inhabits coastal dune forest environments, where it has been collected from under dry Strelitzia nicolai leaves on the forest floor and from grassy areas behind coastal dunes. This specialized coastal habitat is experiencing ongoing degradation and loss.

== Description ==
Afrarchaea woodae exhibits the characteristic features of the genus, including a greatly elevated cephalic region and elongated chelicerae. Both males and females are known for this species.

== Conservation status ==
Afrarchaea woodae is classified as Endangered by the South African National Biodiversity Institute. This classification reflects the species' extremely restricted distribution to coastal dune forest habitats that are experiencing ongoing habitat loss.

The primary threats to the species include coastal housing development, subsistence crop cultivation and general coastal development pressures.

The species is currently protected within Cwebe Nature Reserve, but development around the Kei River area represents an ongoing threat. Additional sampling is needed to better understand the species' distribution and population status.

== Behaviour ==
Female Afrarchaea woodae exhibit maternal care by attaching their egg sacs to their fourth leg, a behaviour that has been documented photographically and represents a characteristic feature of the genus.

== Taxonomy ==
The species was described by L.N. Lotz in 2006 based on both male and female specimens from coastal dune forest habitats. The species has been the subject of additional morphological studies, including micro-computed tomography research that revealed details of the male reproductive anatomy.
