= Afrarchaea neethlingi =

Scientific classification
- Kingdom: Animalia
- Phylum: Arthropoda
- Subphylum: Chelicerata
- Class: Arachnida
- Order: Araneae
- Infraorder: Araneomorphae
- Family: Archaeidae
- Genus: Afrarchaea
- Species: A. neethlingi

Binomial name
- Afrarchaea neethlingi Lotz, 2017

Species of spider

Afrarchaea neethlingi is a species of spider of the genus Afrarchaea. It is endemic to South Africa.

== Distribution ==
Afrarchaea neethlingi is known only from the Platberg Nature Reserve near Harrismith in the Free State province, South Africa. The species has an extremely restricted range of only 4 km², at an elevation of 2,329 metres above sea level.

== Habitat ==
The species inhabits grassland environments where it has been collected from leaf litter under trees. This high-altitude grassland habitat represents a unique ecosystem within the Free State province.

== Description ==
Afrarchaea neethlingi exhibits the characteristic features of the genus, including a greatly elevated cephalic region and elongated chelicerae. Both males and females are known for this species.

== Conservation status ==
Afrarchaea neethlingi is classified as Rare by the South African National Biodiversity Institute. The species has a restricted distribution and is known only from eight specimens collected from the type locality. However, because it occurs within a protected area where it is not currently threatened, it is listed as Rare rather than in a higher threat category.

The species is protected within Platberg Nature Reserve, but additional sampling is needed to better understand its distribution and population dynamics within the reserve and potentially in surrounding areas.
