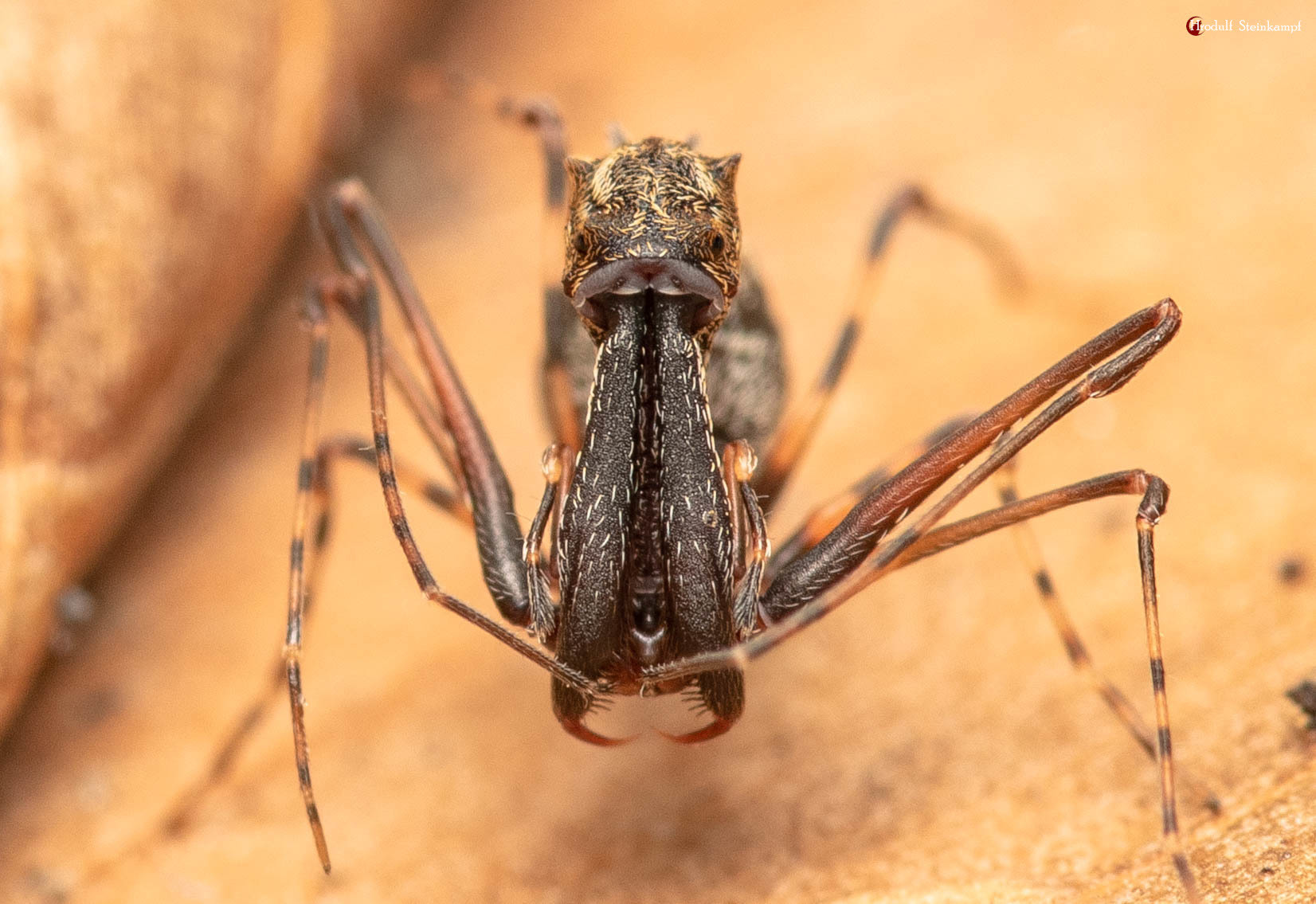
- female A. cornuta
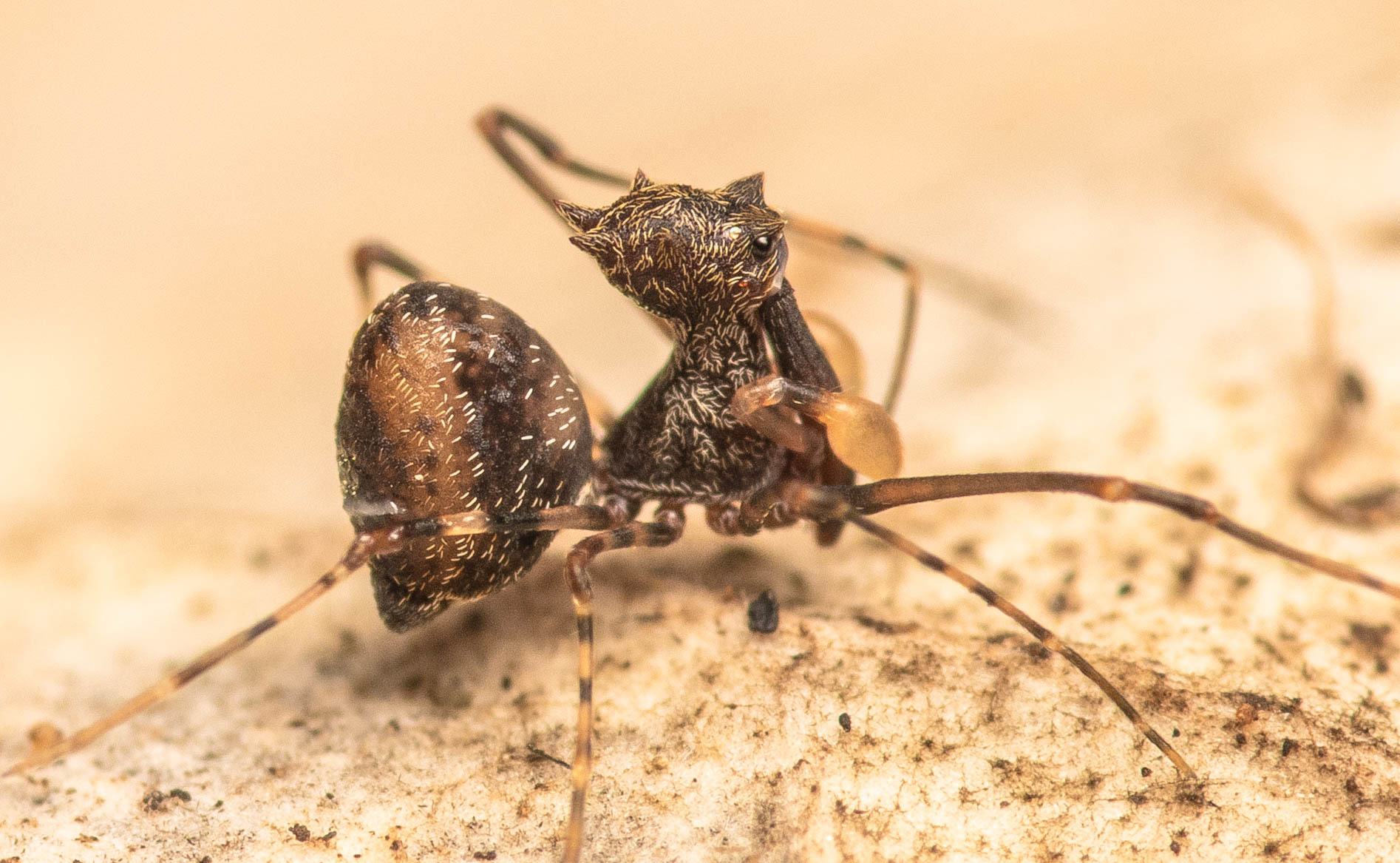
- juvenile male A. cornuta

Scientific classification
- Kingdom: Animalia
- Phylum: Arthropoda
- Subphylum: Chelicerata
- Class: Arachnida
- Order: Araneae
- Infraorder: Araneomorphae
- Family: Archaeidae
- Genus: Afrarchaea; Forster & Platnick, 1984

Type species
- Afrarchaea godfreyi (Hewitt, 1919)

Diversity
- 14 species

= Afrarchaea =

African assassin spiders

Genus of spiders

Afrarchaea is a genus of spiders in the family Archaeidae, commonly known as African assassin spiders or pelican spiders. The genus is endemic to South Africa, where all 14 known species are found.

== Etymology ==
The genus name Afrarchaea combines "Afr-" referring to Africa with Archaea, the type genus of the family Archaeidae.

== Description ==
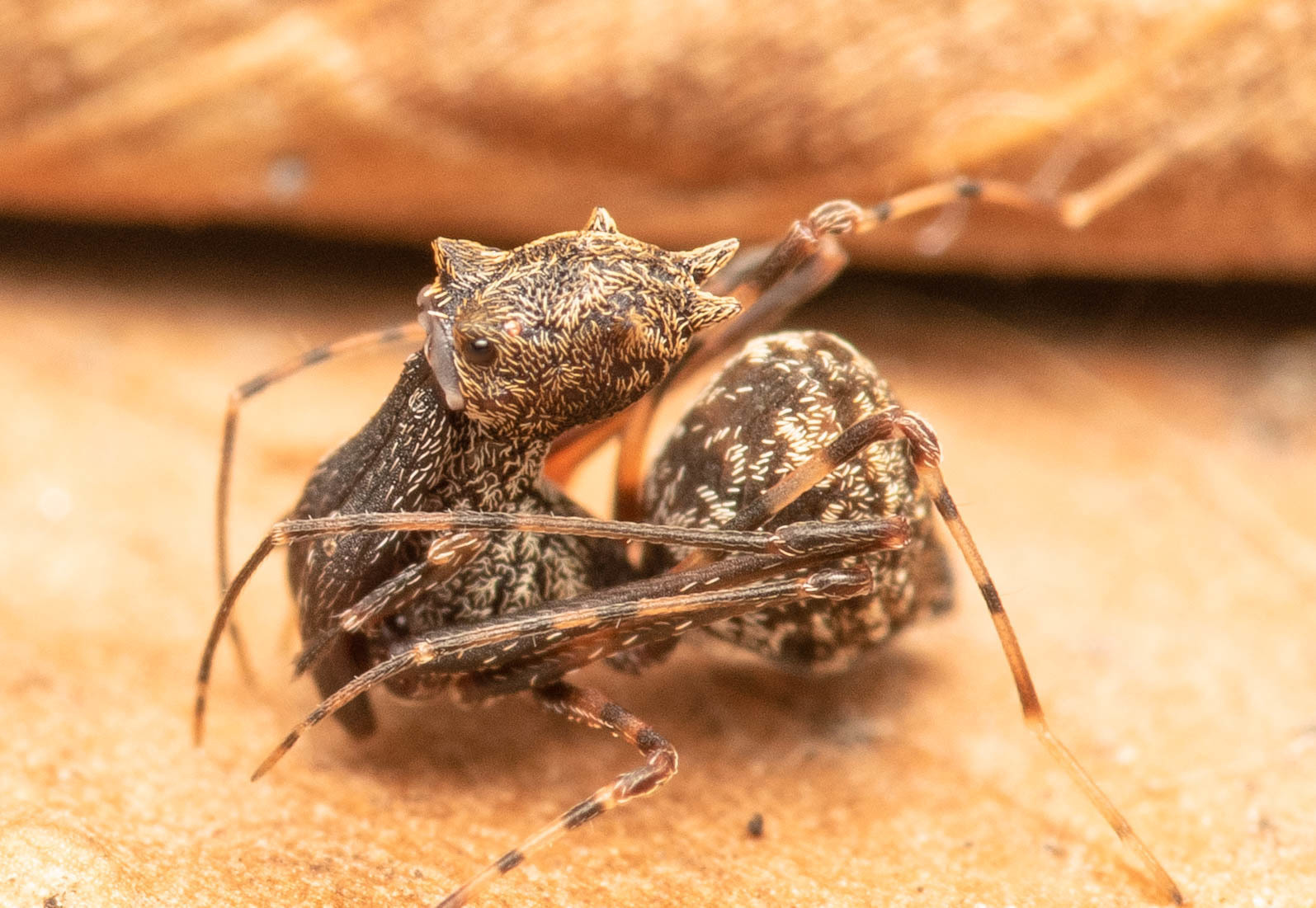
female A. cornuta

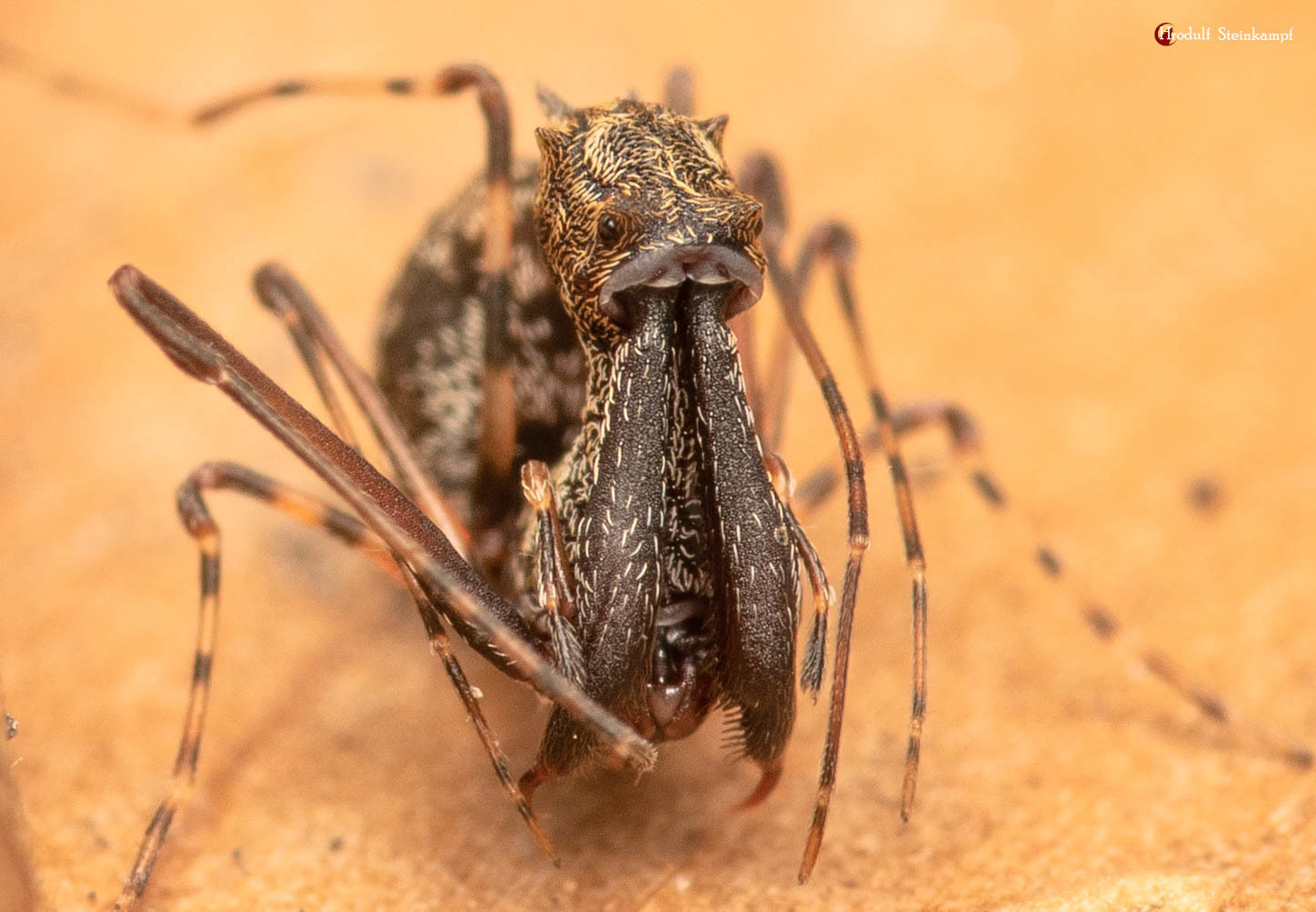
female A. cornuta

Afrarchaea spiders are small to medium-sized, measuring 3-7 mm in body length. They vary in colour from reddish brown to yellowish brown. The cephalothorax has a characteristic greatly elevated cephalic region that rises well above the thoracic region, giving these spiders their distinctive "pelican-like" appearance. This elevated region is rounded and ornamented with small, flattened, granular tubercles, each bearing a short, thick seta.

The chelicerae are enlarged, long and slender with relatively short, strongly curved fangs. The cheliceral movement is both sideways and up-and-down. The cheliceral furrow is weak with distinctive peg teeth, while the retromargin has conical true teeth. The outer surface of the chelicerae bears faint stridulating ridges used for sound production.

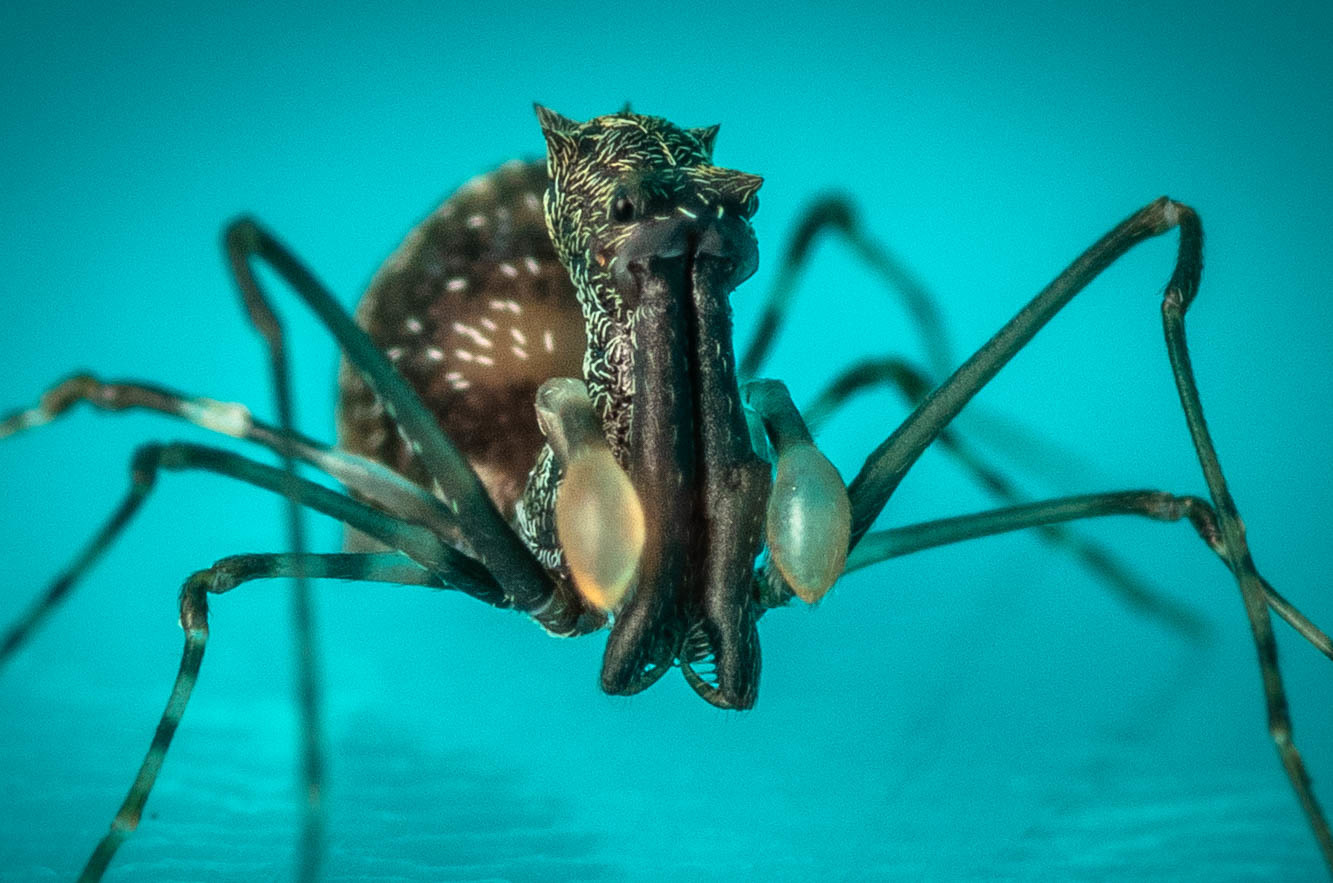
juvenile male A. cornuta

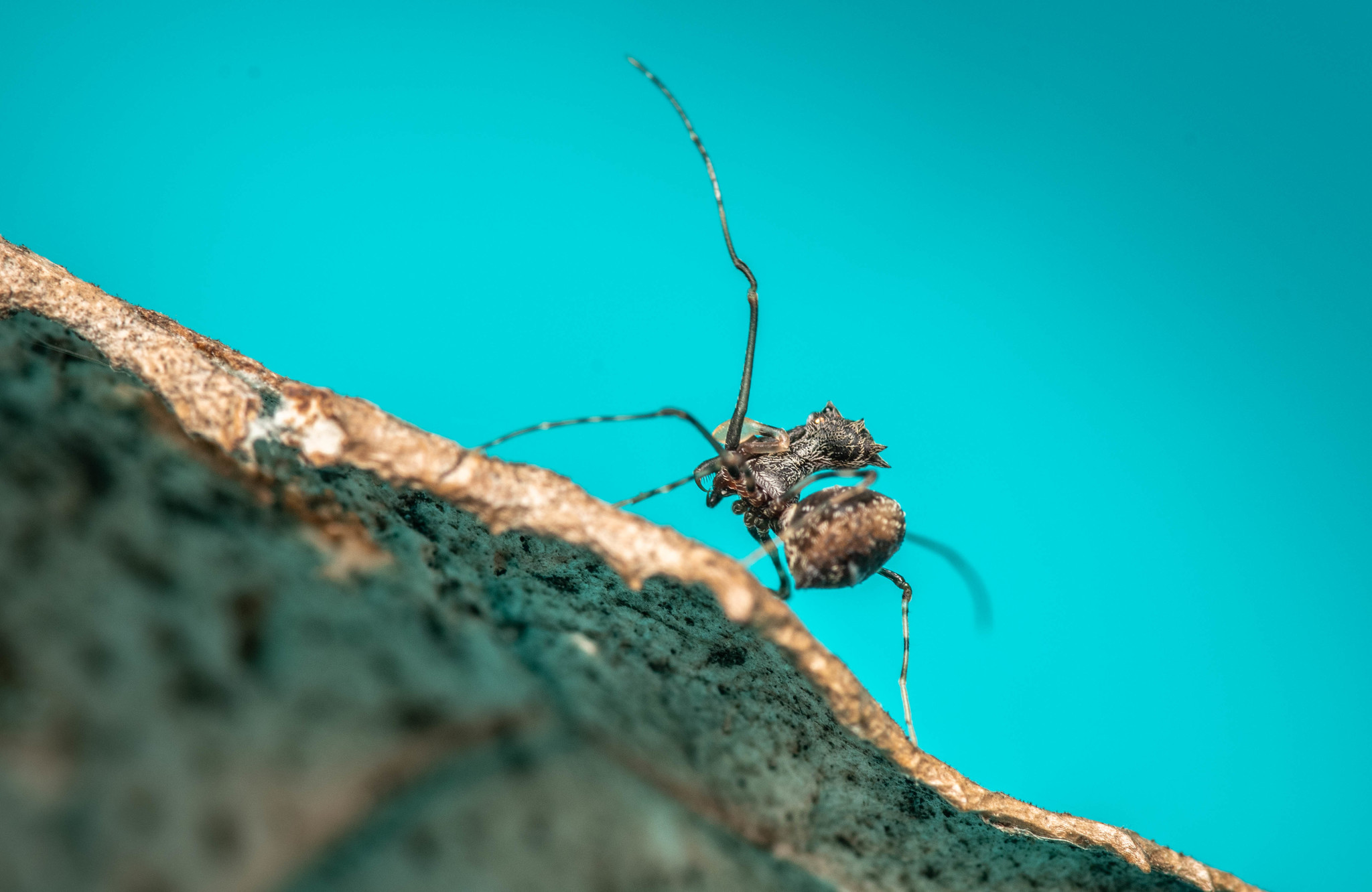
juvenile male A. cornuta

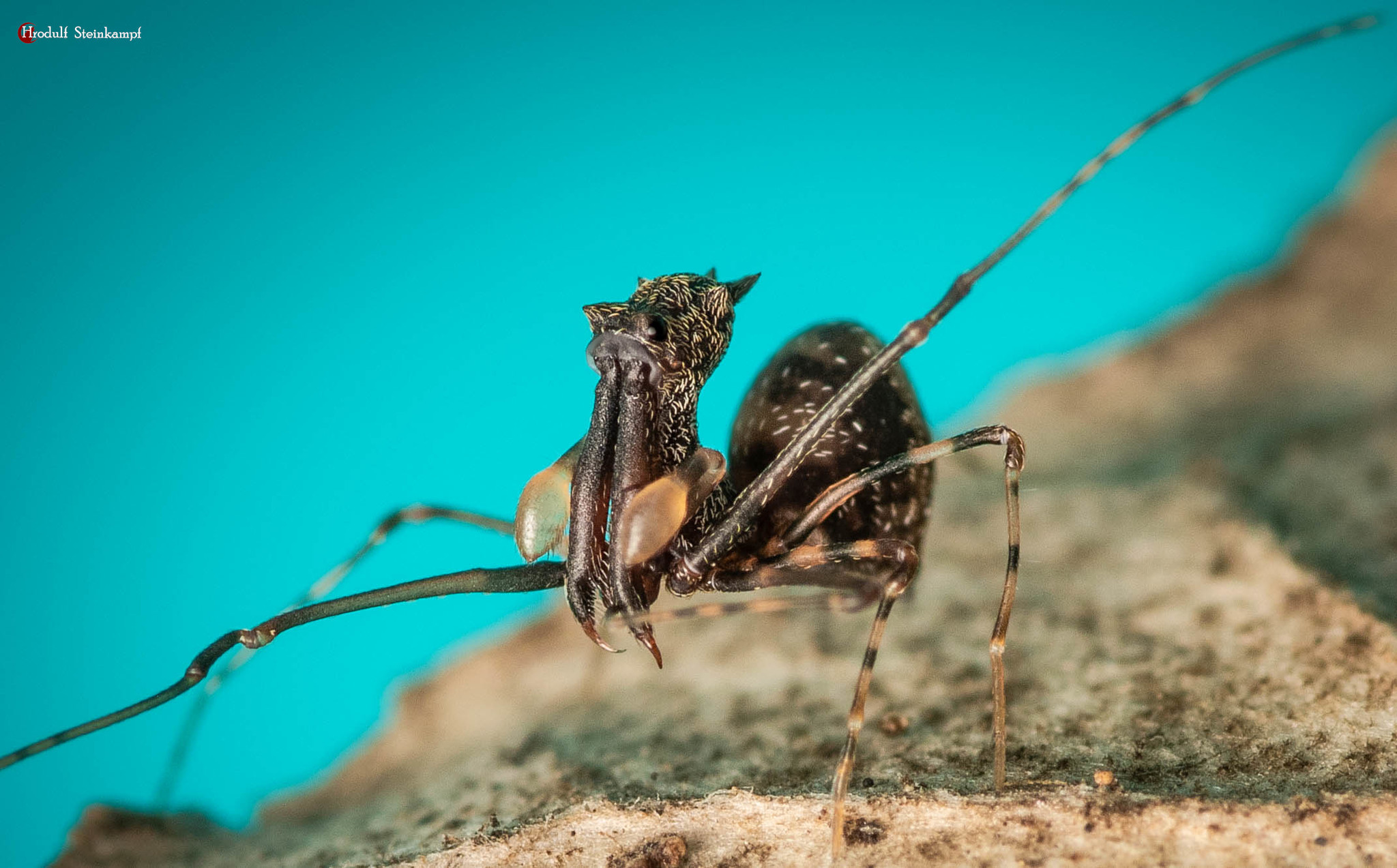
juvenile male A. cornuta

The eyes are arranged in two rows of four, with the eyes being almost equal in size. The lateral eyes are contiguous, while the anterior median eyes are large and dark, with the remaining eyes smaller and paler.

The opisthosoma is sub-globular and soft with sclerotised patches. The legs are long and slender, with leg I being the longest and leg III the shortest. The three claws are mounted on short, distinct, sclerotised structures and lack spines, being either smooth or bearing plumose flat setae.

== Ecology and behaviour ==
Afrarchaea spiders are free-living, cryptozoic hunters that typically occur in shady, humid, dense bush environments with vegetation litter. They are predatory spiders that hunt other spiders, using their elongated chelicerae to capture prey while maintaining a safe distance from potentially dangerous quarry.

Females attach their egg sacs to their fourth leg (leg IV), a behaviour documented in several species including Afrarchaea woodae.

== Distribution and habitat ==
All Afrarchaea species are endemic to South Africa, where they are mostly found in forested areas across several provinces including the Eastern Cape, KwaZulu-Natal, Mpumalanga, Limpopo, and the Free State. Most species have very restricted distributions and are considered rare, with many known only from their type localities.

The spiders inhabit various forest types including coastal dune forests, montane forests, riverine forests, and grassland ecotones. Several species have been recorded from protected areas such as the Kruger National Park and various nature reserves.

== Conservation status ==
Many Afrarchaea species face conservation challenges due to their restricted distributions and habitat threats. The conservation status of the species ranges from Least Concern to Critically Endangered:

- Critically Endangered: A. entabeniensis and A. fernkloofensis
- Endangered: A. woodae
- Vulnerable: A. cornuta and A. ngomensis
- Rare: A. neethlingi
- Least Concern: A. bergae and A. godfreyi

Major threats include habitat transformation for agriculture and forestry, urban development, and invasion by alien plant species.

== Taxonomy ==
The genus was established by Forster and Platnick in 1984 with Afrarchaea godfreyi as the type species. The genus has been comprehensively revised through a series of five papers by L.N. Lotz between 1996 and 2017.

Two species originally described in Afrarchaea have been transferred to other genera: A. fisheri and A. mahariraensis are now placed in Eriauchenius.

== Species ==
As of September 2025, the genus contains 14 species:

- Afrarchaea ansieae Lotz, 2015
- Afrarchaea bergae Lotz, 1996
- Afrarchaea cornuta (Lotz, 2003)
- Afrarchaea entabeniensis Lotz, 2003
- Afrarchaea fernkloofensis Lotz, 1996
- Afrarchaea godfreyi (Hewitt, 1919) (type species)
- Afrarchaea haddadi Lotz, 2006
- Afrarchaea harveyi Lotz, 2003
- Afrarchaea kranskopensis Lotz, 1996
- Afrarchaea lawrencei Lotz, 1996
- Afrarchaea neethlingi Lotz, 2017
- Afrarchaea ngomensis Lotz, 1996
- Afrarchaea royalensis Lotz, 2006
- Afrarchaea woodae Lotz, 2006
