= Afrarchaea haddadi =

Scientific classification
- Kingdom: Animalia
- Phylum: Arthropoda
- Subphylum: Chelicerata
- Class: Arachnida
- Order: Araneae
- Infraorder: Araneomorphae
- Family: Archaeidae
- Genus: Afrarchaea
- Species: A. haddadi

Binomial name
- Afrarchaea haddadi Lotz, 2006

Species of spider

Afrarchaea haddadi is a species of spider of the genus Afrarchaea. It is endemic to South Africa.

== Etymology ==
The species is named after South African arachnologist Charles R. Haddad.

== Distribution ==
Afrarchaea haddadi is known only from Komga, 40 km from Kei River Mouth in the Eastern Cape province, South Africa. The species has an extremely restricted range of only 4 km², at an elevation of 78 metres above sea level.

== Habitat ==
The species inhabits coastal forest within the Indian Ocean Coastal Belt biome. It has been collected under dead palm leaves on the ground and under stones in this specialized coastal forest environment.

== Description ==
Afrarchaea haddadi exhibits the characteristic features of the genus, including a greatly elevated cephalic region and elongated chelicerae. Currently, only females are known; the male remains undescribed.

== Conservation status ==
Afrarchaea haddadi is classified as Data Deficient for Taxonomic reasons (DDT) by the South African National Biodiversity Institute. The species is suspected to occur in surrounding areas of coastal forest, but its status remains unclear. Additional sampling is needed to collect males and determine the species' true range and population status.

== Behaviour ==
Females have been observed carrying egg sacs, demonstrating the typical maternal care behaviour seen in the genus Afrarchaea.
