= Afrarchaea ngomensis =

Ngome Assassin Spider

Conservation status
- Vulnerable (SANBI Red List)

Scientific classification
- Kingdom: Animalia
- Phylum: Arthropoda
- Subphylum: Chelicerata
- Class: Arachnida
- Order: Araneae
- Infraorder: Araneomorphae
- Family: Archaeidae
- Genus: Afrarchaea
- Species: A. ngomensis

Binomial name
- Afrarchaea ngomensis Lotz, 1996

Species of spider

Afrarchaea ngomensis is a species of spider of the genus Afrarchaea. It is endemic to South Africa.

== Etymology ==
The species name ngomensis refers to its type locality, Ngome State Forest in KwaZulu-Natal.

== Distribution ==
Afrarchaea ngomensis has been recorded from two provinces in South Africa: KwaZulu-Natal (Ngome State Forest) and Mpumalanga (Graskop, Fairy Forest). The species is likely undersampled and may occur in additional patches of indigenous forest between these locations.

== Habitat ==
The species inhabits high mountainous forest and dense indigenous forest environments within the Forest and Savanna biomes. It has been sampled using pitfall traps from indigenous forest as well as in ecotones between natural forest and pine plantations.

== Description ==
Afrarchaea ngomensis exhibits the characteristic features of the genus, including a greatly elevated cephalic region and elongated chelicerae. Both males and females are known for this species.

== Conservation status ==
Afrarchaea ngomensis is classified as Vulnerable under criterion D2 by the South African National Biodiversity Institute. Although the species is recorded from two provinces, it is currently known from only two locations and has lost habitat in the past to pine plantations. Further habitat loss to plantation forestry represents a potential ongoing threat.

The species is protected within both Graskop Fairy Forest and Ngome State Forest, but the limited number of known populations makes it vulnerable to localized threats. Additional sampling is needed to identify other potential populations.
