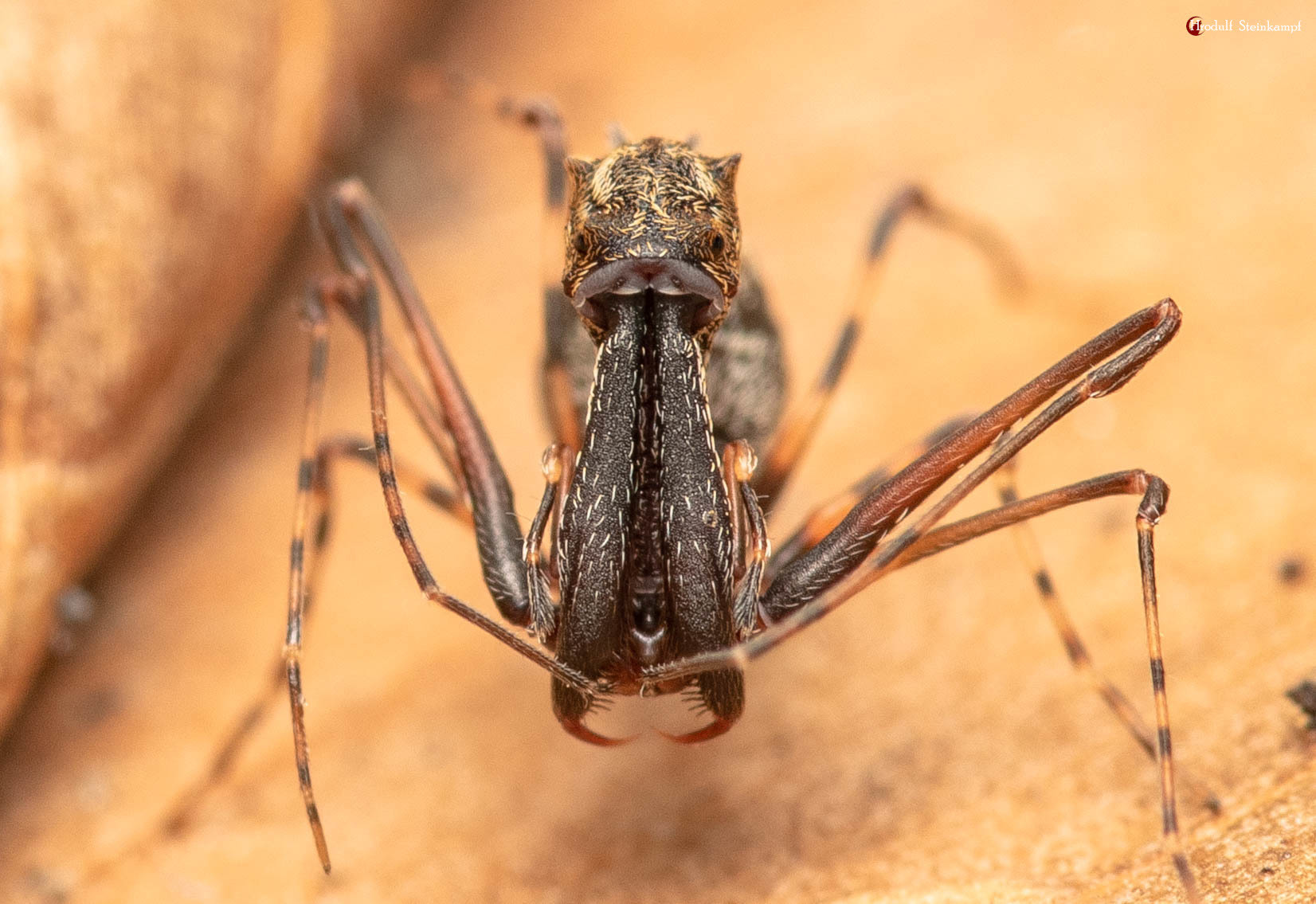
- female
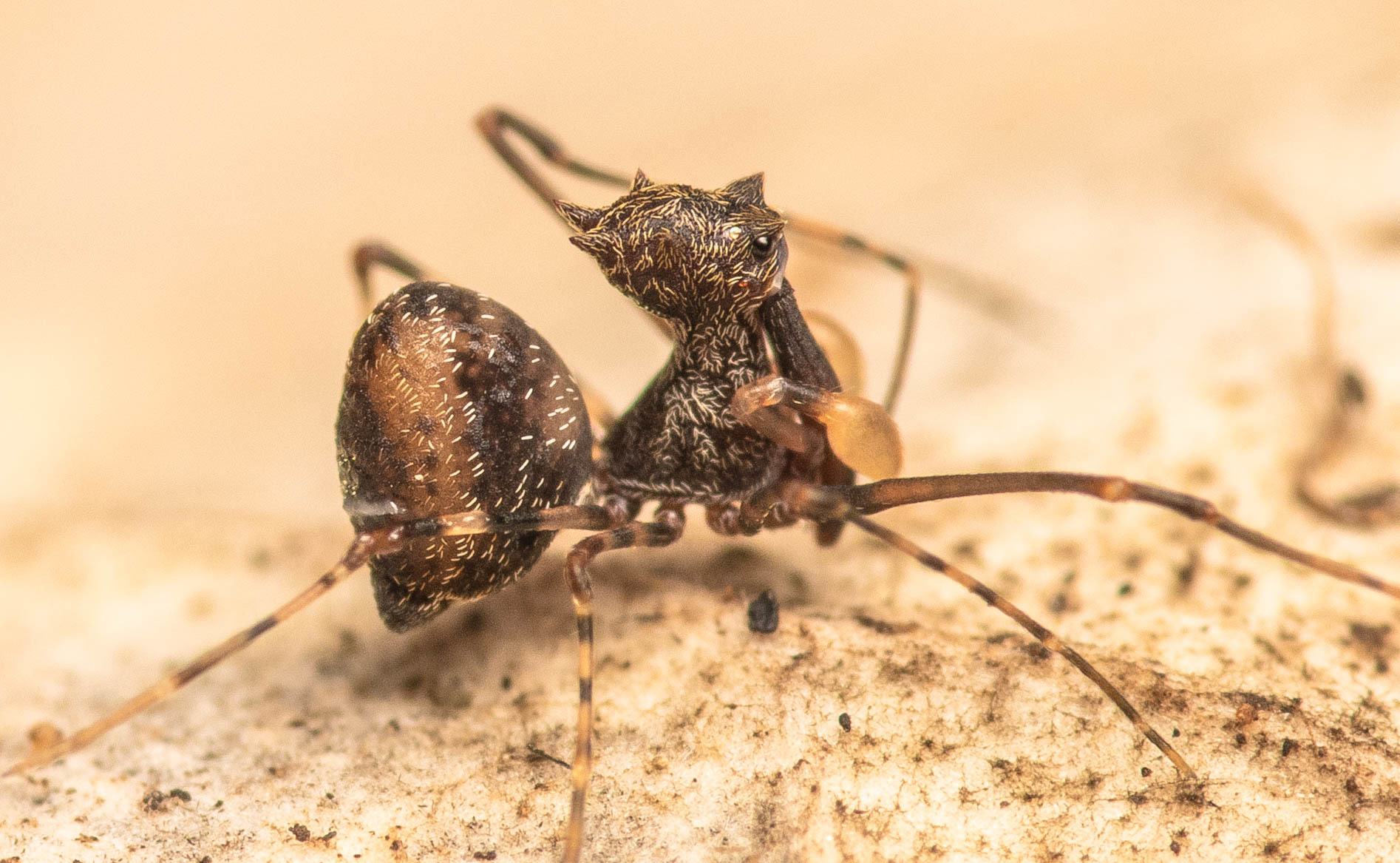
- juvenile male

Scientific classification
- Kingdom: Animalia
- Phylum: Arthropoda
- Subphylum: Chelicerata
- Class: Arachnida
- Order: Araneae
- Infraorder: Araneomorphae
- Family: Archaeidae
- Genus: Afrarchaea
- Species: A. cornuta

Binomial name
- Afrarchaea cornuta (Lotz, 2003)

Synonyms
- Archaea cornutus Lotz, 2003; Eriauchenius cornutus (Lotz, 2003)

= Afrarchaea cornuta =

Long-necked assassin spider

Species of spider

Afrarchaea cornuta is a species of spider of the genus Afrarchaea. It is endemic to South Africa.

== Etymology ==
The species name cornuta means "horned" in Latin.

== Distribution ==
Afrarchaea cornuta is known only from Vernon Crookes Nature Reserve in KwaZulu-Natal province, South Africa. The species has an extremely restricted range at an elevation of 444 metres above sea level.

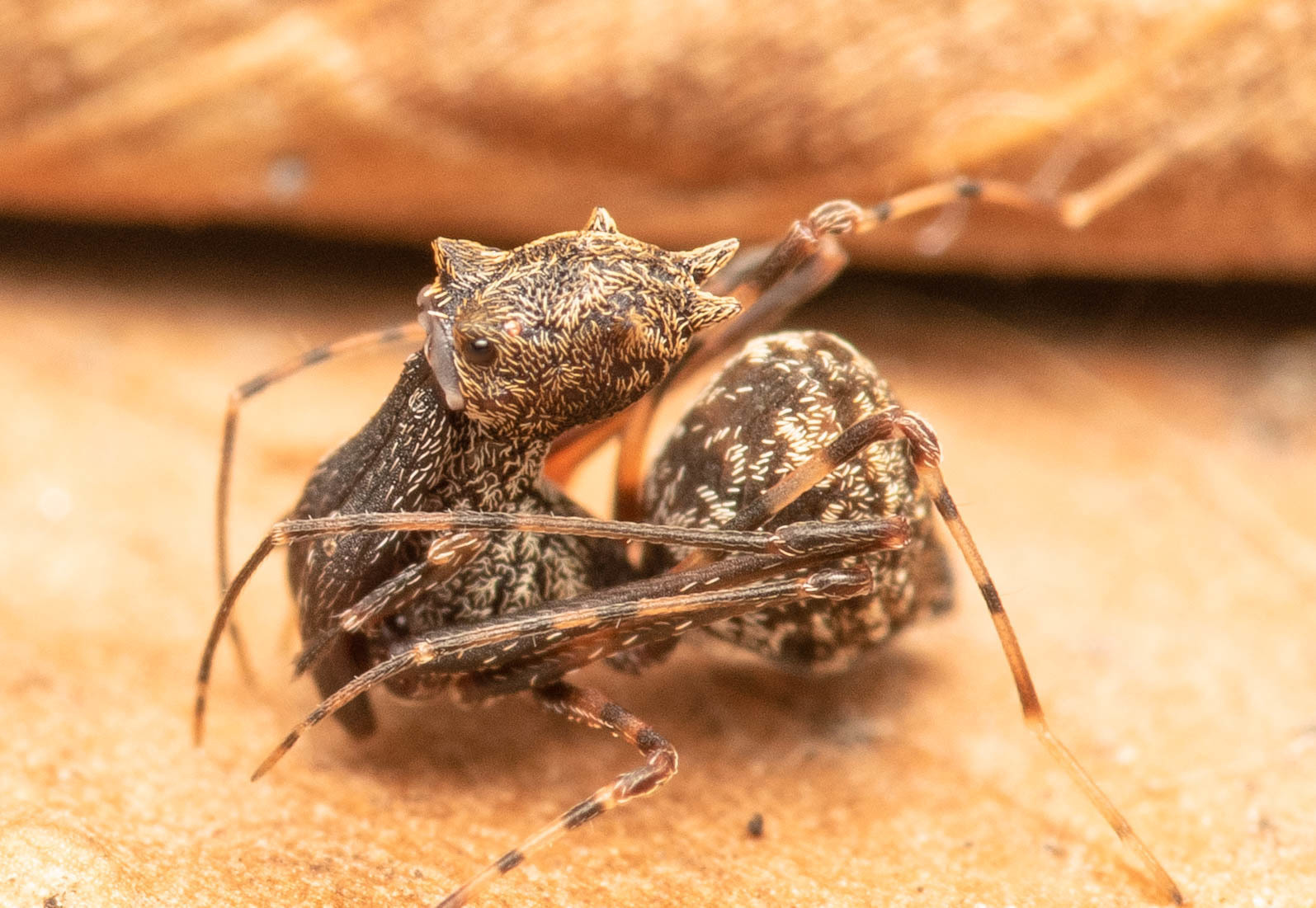
female

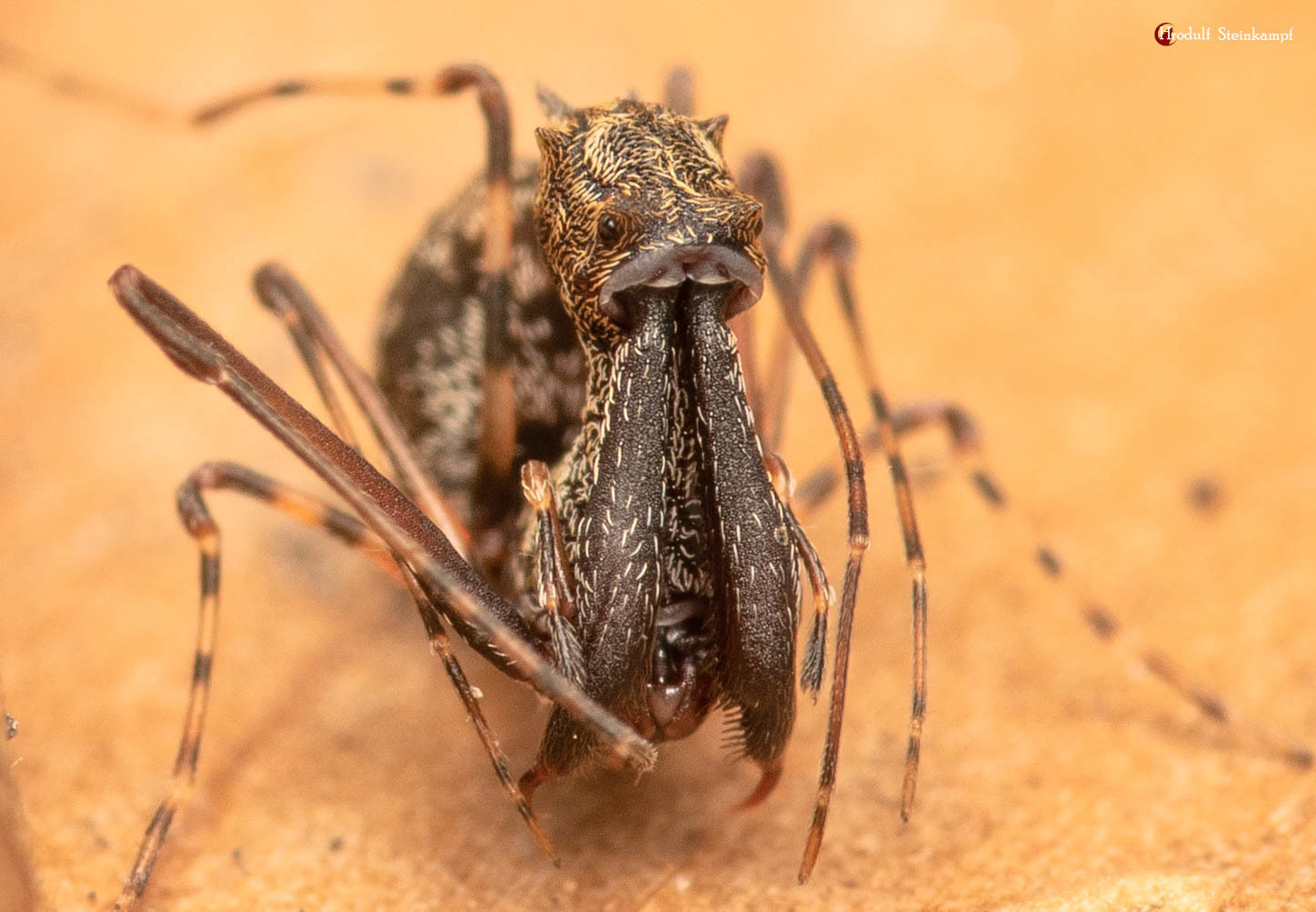
female

== Habitat ==
The species inhabits the ecotone between coastal forest and grassland within the Grassland and Savanna biomes. This specialized transitional habitat represents a unique ecological niche.

== Description ==
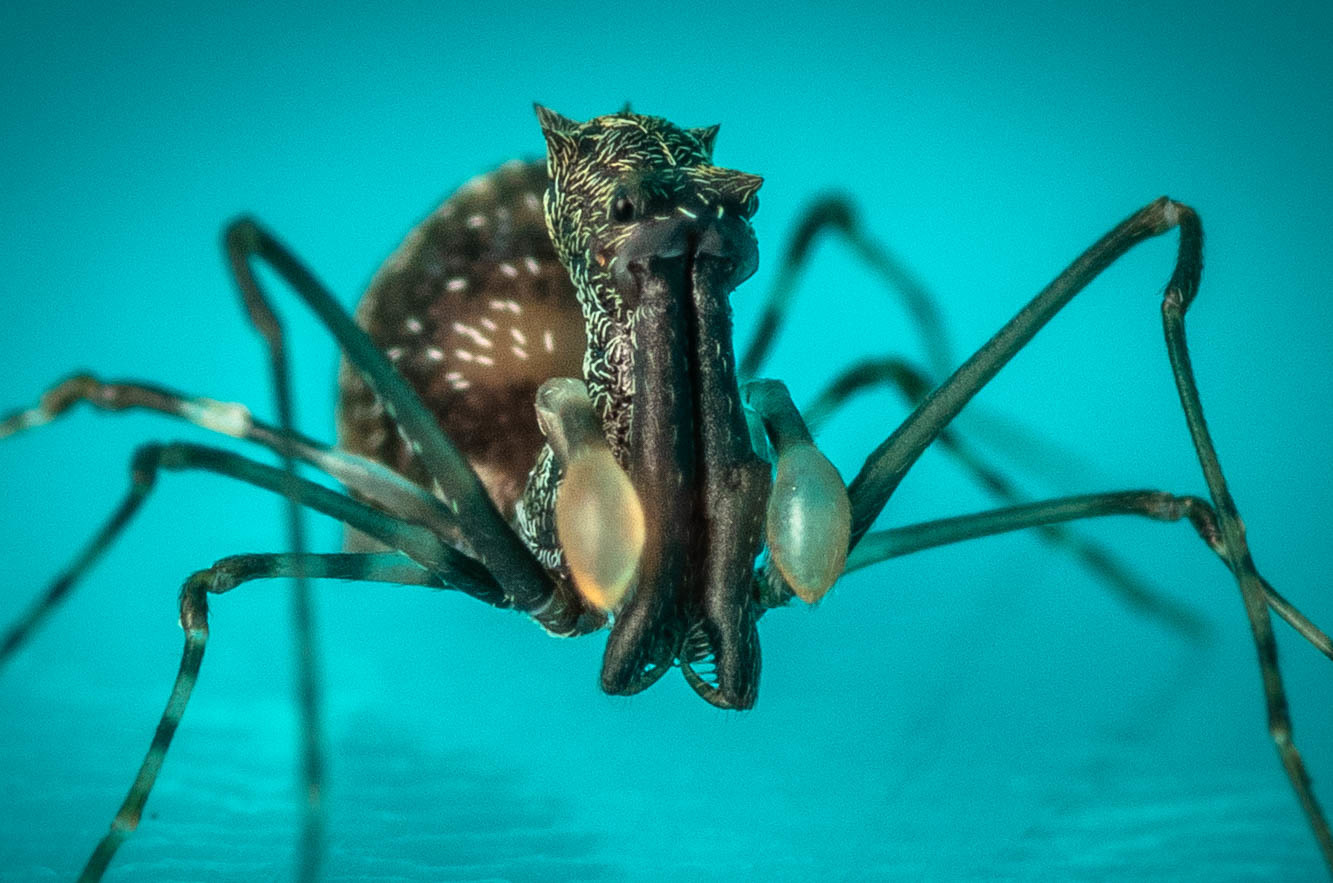
juvenile male

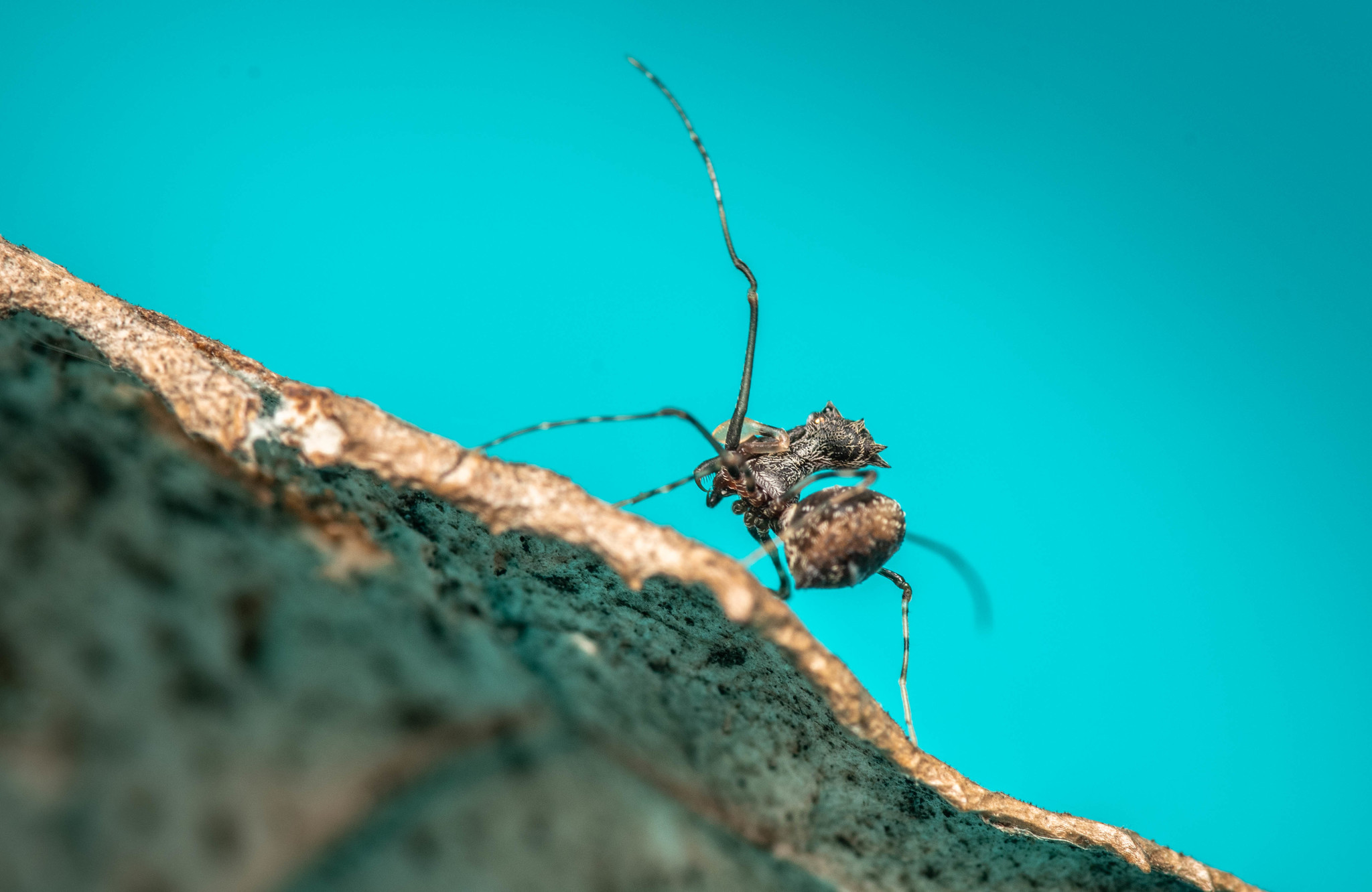
juvenile male

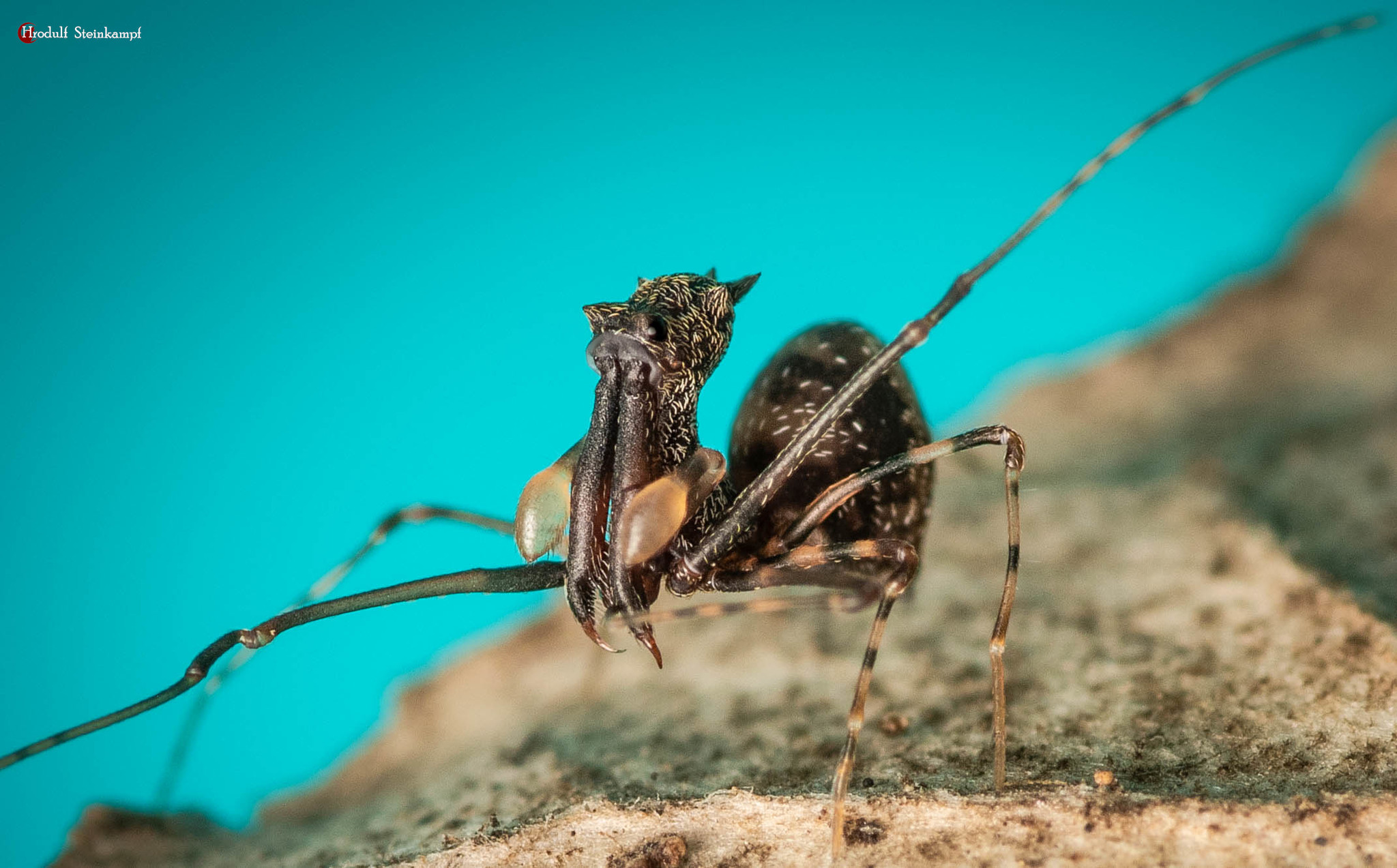
juvenile male

Afrarchaea cornuta exhibits the characteristic features of the genus, including a greatly elevated cephalic region and elongated chelicerae. Both males and females are known for this species.

== Conservation status ==
Afrarchaea cornuta is classified as Vulnerable under criterion D2 by the South African National Biodiversity Institute. The species has likely lost extensive habitat in the past as areas surrounding Vernon Crookes Nature Reserve have been severely transformed for crop cultivation. While the species receives some protection within the reserve, this area is very small and remains vulnerable to disturbance and invasion by alien plant species.

== Taxonomy ==
The species was originally described by Lotz in 2003 as Archaea cornutus. The female was described in 2006 as Eriauchenius cornutus, before Wood & Scharff transferred the species to Afrarchaea in 2018.
