= Afrarchaea royalensis =

Scientific classification
- Kingdom: Animalia
- Phylum: Arthropoda
- Subphylum: Chelicerata
- Class: Arachnida
- Order: Araneae
- Infraorder: Araneomorphae
- Family: Archaeidae
- Genus: Afrarchaea
- Species: A. royalensis

Binomial name
- Afrarchaea royalensis Lotz, 2006

Species of spider

Afrarchaea royalensis is a species of spider of the genus Afrarchaea. It is endemic to South Africa.

== Etymology ==
The species name royalensis refers to its type locality in the Royal National Park near Bergville.

== Distribution ==
Afrarchaea royalensis is known only from Bergville in the Royal National Park, KwaZulu-Natal province, South Africa. The species has an extremely restricted range of only 4 km², at an elevation of 1,703 metres above sea level.

== Habitat ==
The species inhabits montane forest environments, where it has been found in litter sampled from sloping mountain slopes. This high-altitude forest habitat represents a specialized montane ecosystem within the Royal National Park.

== Description ==
Afrarchaea royalensis exhibits the characteristic features of the genus, including a greatly elevated cephalic region and elongated chelicerae. Currently, only females are known; the male remains undescribed.

== Conservation status ==
Afrarchaea royalensis is classified as Data Deficient for Taxonomic reasons (DDT) by the South African National Biodiversity Institute. The species' status remains unclear, and additional sampling is needed to collect males and determine the species' true range and population status.

The species is protected within the Royal National Park near Bergville, which provides some conservation security, but more comprehensive sampling is needed to understand its distribution within the park and potential occurrence in surrounding areas.
