= Afrarchaea lawrencei =

Lawrence's Assassin Spider

Scientific classification
- Kingdom: Animalia
- Phylum: Arthropoda
- Subphylum: Chelicerata
- Class: Arachnida
- Order: Araneae
- Infraorder: Araneomorphae
- Family: Archaeidae
- Genus: Afrarchaea
- Species: A. lawrencei

Binomial name
- Afrarchaea lawrencei Lotz, 1996

Species of spider

Afrarchaea lawrencei is a species of spider of the genus Afrarchaea. It is endemic to South Africa.

== Distribution ==
Afrarchaea lawrencei is known only from the Trafalgar area in KwaZulu-Natal province, South Africa. The species has an extremely restricted range with both Extent of Occurrence (EOO) and Area of Occupancy (AOO) of only 4 km² each, at an elevation of 6 metres above sea level.

== Habitat ==
The species was sampled from coastal dune forest in the Trafalgar area in 1963. This coastal habitat represents a specialized low-elevation forest ecosystem near the Indian Ocean.

== Description ==
Afrarchaea lawrencei exhibits the characteristic features of the genus, including a greatly elevated cephalic region and elongated chelicerae. Both males and females are known for this species.

== Conservation status ==
Afrarchaea lawrencei is classified as Data Deficient for Taxonomic reasons (DDT) by the South African National Biodiversity Institute. The species' status remains unclear, and additional sampling is needed to determine the species' current range and population status.

A concern is that the species is not currently protected within any formal reserve system, and coastal areas like Trafalgar face ongoing development pressures. The species was last collected in 1963, highlighting the need for updated surveys.
