= Afrarchaea entabeniensis =

Entebeni Assassin Spider

Conservation status
- Critically endangered (SANBI Red List)

Scientific classification
- Kingdom: Animalia
- Phylum: Arthropoda
- Subphylum: Chelicerata
- Class: Arachnida
- Order: Araneae
- Infraorder: Araneomorphae
- Family: Archaeidae
- Genus: Afrarchaea
- Species: A. entabeniensis

Binomial name
- Afrarchaea entabeniensis Lotz, 2003

Species of spider

Afrarchaea entabeniensis is a species of spider of the genus Afrarchaea. It is endemic to South Africa.

== Etymology ==
The species name entabeniensis refers to its type locality, Entabeni State Forest Reserve in Limpopo province.

== Distribution ==
Afrarchaea entabeniensis is known only from the Entabeni State Forest Reserve in Limpopo province, South Africa. The species has an extremely restricted range with both Extent of Occurrence (EOO) and Area of Occupancy (AOO) of only 4 km² each, at an elevation of 831 metres above sea level.

== Habitat ==
The species inhabits montane forest environments, where it has been collected from sieved litter on the forest floor. The spider's habitat represents a specialized montane forest ecosystem within the broader regional landscape.

== Description ==
Afrarchaea entabeniensis exhibits the characteristic features of the genus, including a greatly elevated cephalic region and elongated chelicerae. Currently, only the female is known; the male remains undescribed.

== Conservation status ==
Afrarchaea entabeniensis is classified as Critically Endangered by the South African National Biodiversity Institute. This classification is based on its extremely small and restricted distribution range combined with ongoing habitat transformation threats.

The primary threat to the species is the continuous transformation of the area surrounding its habitat for pine plantation forestry. This ongoing habitat conversion represents a significant threat to the species' survival due to its limited distribution and specialized habitat requirements.

The species is currently protected within the Entabeni State Forest, but additional sampling is needed to better understand its distribution and population status. The species was re-collected at the same site by Foord et al. in 2008, confirming its continued presence but highlighting its restricted range.

== Taxonomy ==
The species was described by L.N. Lotz in 2003 based on female specimens. The male remains unknown, limiting complete understanding of the species' morphology and reproductive biology.
