= Afrarchaea harveyi =

Harvey's Assassin Spider

Scientific classification
- Kingdom: Animalia
- Phylum: Arthropoda
- Subphylum: Chelicerata
- Class: Arachnida
- Order: Araneae
- Infraorder: Araneomorphae
- Family: Archaeidae
- Genus: Afrarchaea
- Species: A. harveyi

Binomial name
- Afrarchaea harveyi Lotz, 2003

Species of spider

Afrarchaea harveyi is a species of spider of the genus Afrarchaea. It is endemic to South Africa.

== Distribution ==
Afrarchaea harveyi is known only from Champagne Castle in the Drakensberg Mountains of KwaZulu-Natal province, South Africa. The species has an extremely restricted range of only 4 km², at an elevation of 1,725 m above sea level.

== Habitat ==
The species inhabits montane grasslands in the high Drakensberg, where it has been collected from under stones. This high-altitude grassland habitat represents a specialized montane ecosystem.

== Description ==
Afrarchaea harveyi exhibits the characteristic features of the genus, including a greatly elevated cephalic region and elongated chelicerae. Currently, only females are known; the male remains undescribed.

== Conservation status ==
Afrarchaea harveyi is classified as Data Deficient for Taxonomic reasons (DDT) by the South African National Biodiversity Institute. The species is likely to occur in other parts of the Drakensberg Mountains, but its status remains unclear. Additional sampling is needed to collect males and determine the species' true range and population status.

The species is partly protected within the Champagne Castle area, but more comprehensive sampling is required to understand its distribution and conservation needs.
