= Afrarchaea fernkloofensis =

Fernkloof Assassin Spider

Conservation status
- Critically endangered (SANBI Red List)

Scientific classification
- Kingdom: Animalia
- Phylum: Arthropoda
- Subphylum: Chelicerata
- Class: Arachnida
- Order: Araneae
- Infraorder: Araneomorphae
- Family: Archaeidae
- Genus: Afrarchaea
- Species: A. fernkloofensis

Binomial name
- Afrarchaea fernkloofensis Lotz, 1996

Species of spider

Afrarchaea fernkloofensis is a species of spider of the genus Afrarchaea. It is endemic to South Africa.

== Etymology ==
The species name fernkloofensis refers to its type locality, Fernkloof near Grahamstown in the Eastern Cape.

== Distribution ==
Afrarchaea fernkloofensis is known only from its type locality at Fernkloof, Grahamstown in the Eastern Cape province, South Africa. The species has an extremely restricted range of only 4 km^{2}, at an elevation of 552 metres above sea level.

== Habitat ==
The species was collected from under a stone in damp bush above Fernkloof. This habitat represents a specialized microenvironment within the broader Eastern Cape landscape.

== Description ==
Afrarchaea fernkloofensis exhibits the characteristic features of the genus, including a greatly elevated cephalic region and elongated chelicerae. Currently, only the male is known; the female remains undescribed.

== Conservation status ==
Afrarchaea fernkloofensis is classified as Critically Endangered under criterion B by the South African National Biodiversity Institute. The species is known only from the holotype male collected in 1933, and is highly likely to be threatened by urban development and habitat degradation due to livestock overgrazing in the Grahamstown area.

The species' extremely small and restricted distribution range, combined with ongoing habitat threats in the urban environment of Grahamstown, places it at critical risk of extinction.
