= Afrarchaea godfreyi =

Godfrey's Assassin Spider

Conservation status
- Least Concern (SANBI Red List)

Scientific classification
- Kingdom: Animalia
- Phylum: Arthropoda
- Subphylum: Chelicerata
- Class: Arachnida
- Order: Araneae
- Infraorder: Araneomorphae
- Family: Archaeidae
- Genus: Afrarchaea
- Species: A. godfreyi

Binomial name
- Afrarchaea godfreyi (Hewitt, 1919)

Synonyms
- Archaea godfreyi Hewitt, 1919

Species of spider

Godfrey's Assassin Spider (Afrarchaea godfreyi) is a species of spider of the genus Afrarchaea and the type species of the genus. It is endemic to South Africa.

== Distribution ==
Afrarchaea godfreyi has the widest distribution of any species in the genus, being recorded from various forests in the Eastern Cape and KwaZulu-Natal provinces. The species is found from 6 to 2,102 metres above sea level.

Known localities include Eastern Cape (Tsolo, Somerville; Dwesa Forest) and KwaZulu-Natal (Ngome State Forest, Ngotsche Forest (Cascades Farm and west of Eshowe), Gwaliweni Forest near Ingwavuma, Pongola Bush Reserve, Sani Pass, Ramsgate, Trafalgar).

== Habitat ==
The species inhabits a variety of forest habitats and has been sampled from three different biomes, demonstrating considerable ecological adaptability. Afrarchaea godfreyi has been recorded from coastal forests, montane forests, and riverine systems. The species has also been found in pine plantations, indicating some tolerance for modified habitats.

== Description ==
Afrarchaea godfreyi exhibits the characteristic features of the genus, including a greatly elevated cephalic region rising well above the thoracic region and elongated chelicerae with distinctive peg teeth. Both males and females are known for this species.

== Conservation status ==
Afrarchaea godfreyi is classified as Least Concern due to its wide geographical range across two provinces and presence in multiple habitat types. There are no significant threats identified for this species, and its broad distribution and ecological flexibility contribute to its stable conservation status.

The species is protected within several conservation areas including Dwesa Nature Reserve, Ingwavuma Gwaliweni Forest, Ngotsche Forest, and Ngome State Forest. No specific conservation actions are recommended due to its stable status.

== Taxonomy ==
The species was originally described by John Hewitt in 1919 as Archaea godfreyi. It was later transferred to the genus Afrarchaea by Forster and Platnick in 1984, when they established the genus with this species as the type species. The species was comprehensively revised by Lotz in 1996.
