= Jixi North railway station =

Railway station in Xuancheng, Anhui

Jixi North 绩溪北
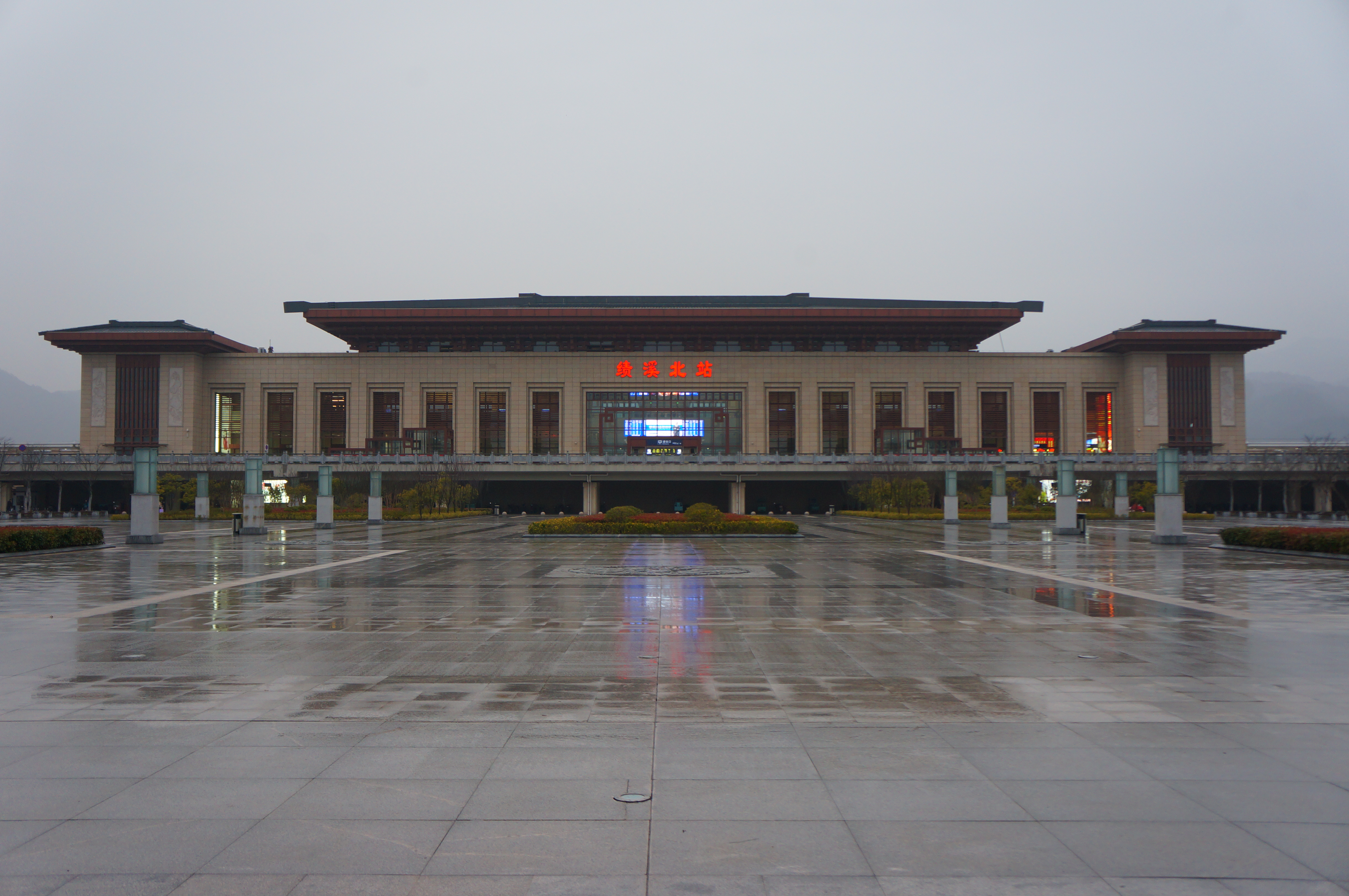

General information
- Location: Jixi County, Xuancheng, Anhui; China
- Coordinates: 30.0738°N 118.5666°E
- Lines: Hefei–Fuzhou high-speed railway; Hangzhou–Huangshan intercity railway; Xuancheng–Jixi high-speed railway

History
- Opened: 28 June 2015
Location

Jixi North railway station (Chinese: 绩溪北站; pinyin: Jìxīběi zhàn) is a railway station in Jixi County, Xuancheng, Anhui, China. It is on the incomplete Beijing–Taipei high-speed rail corridor.

The station is about 2 kilometres (1.2 mi) north-west of Jixi County railway station on the Anhui–Jiangxi railway.

== History ==
The station was opened on 28 June 2015 with the Hefei–Fuzhou high-speed railway.

Preceding station	China Railway High-speed	Following station
Jingde towards Hefei South	Hefei–Fuzhou high-speed railway	Shexian North towards Fuzhou
Sanyang towards Hangzhou East	Hangzhou–Huangshan intercity railway	Shexian North towards Huangshan North
Ningguo South towards Xuancheng	Xuancheng–Jixi high-speed railway	Terminus
