= Xuancheng–Jixi high-speed railway =

Railway line in Anhui, China

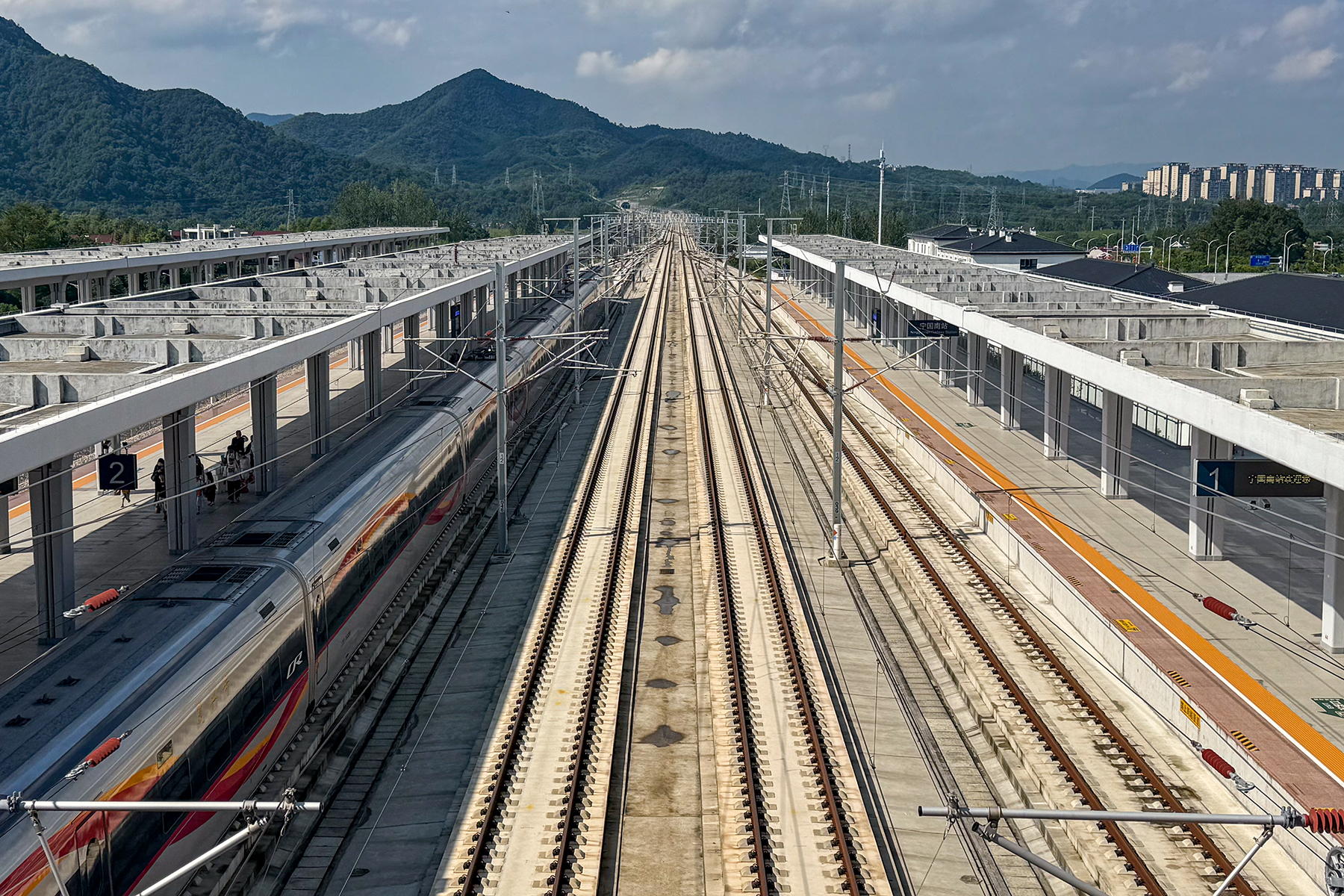
Platforms and Tracks at Ningguonan Railway Station

The Xuancheng–Jixi high-speed railway (Chinese: 宣绩高速铁路; pinyin: Xuānjì gāosù tiělù) is a high-speed railway line in Xuancheng, Anhui, China. The line is 115 kilometres (71 miles) has a maximum speed of 350 kilometres per hour (220 mph). The railway opened on 11 October 2024.

== Stations ==
The northern terminus of the line is Xuancheng railway station in Xuanzhou District, Xuancheng and the southern terminus is Jixi North railway station in Jixi County, Xuancheng. The line will have one intermediate stop, Ningguo South railway station.
