= Huangshan City =

Huangshan 黄山市
- Prefecture-level city
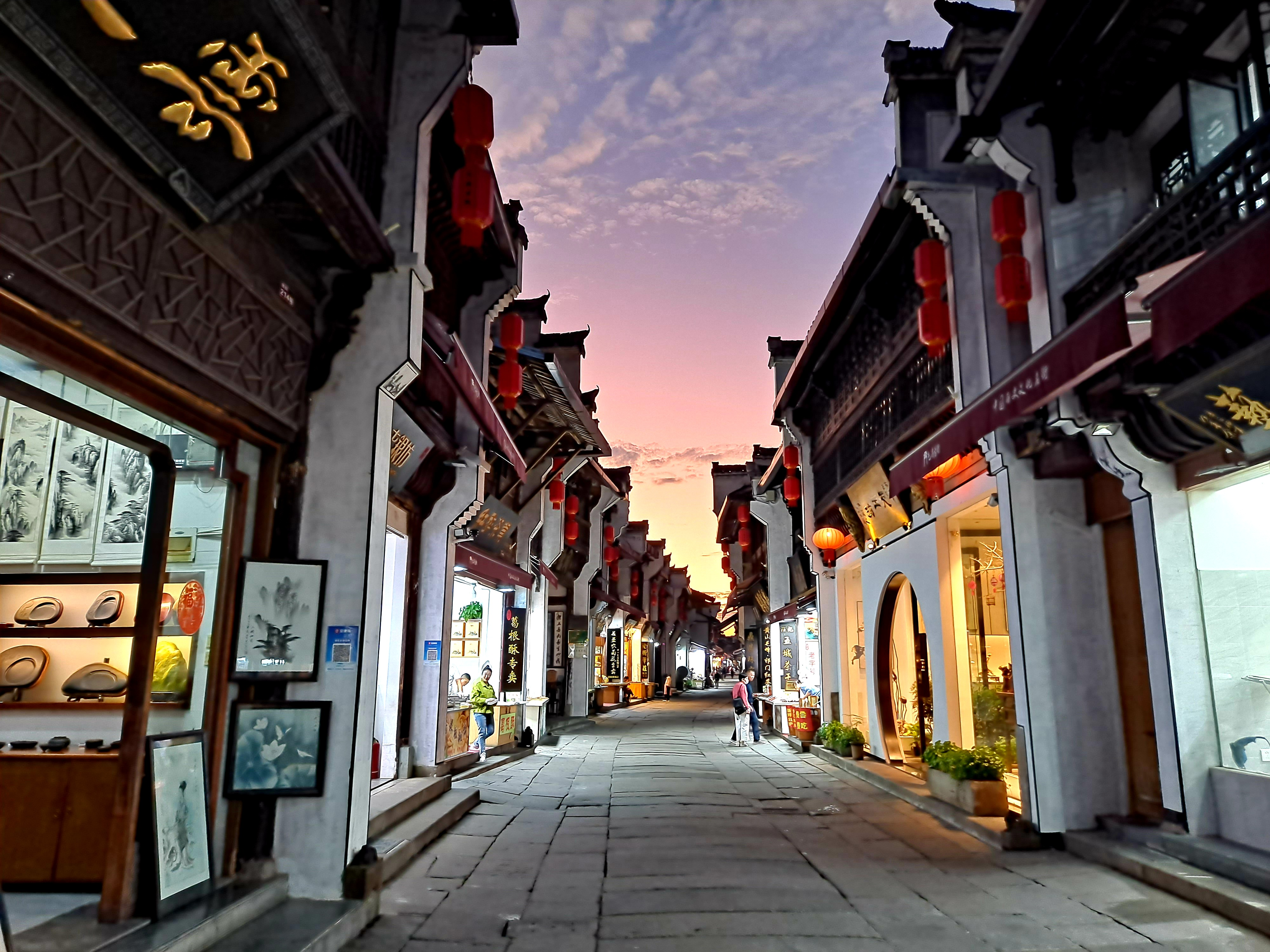
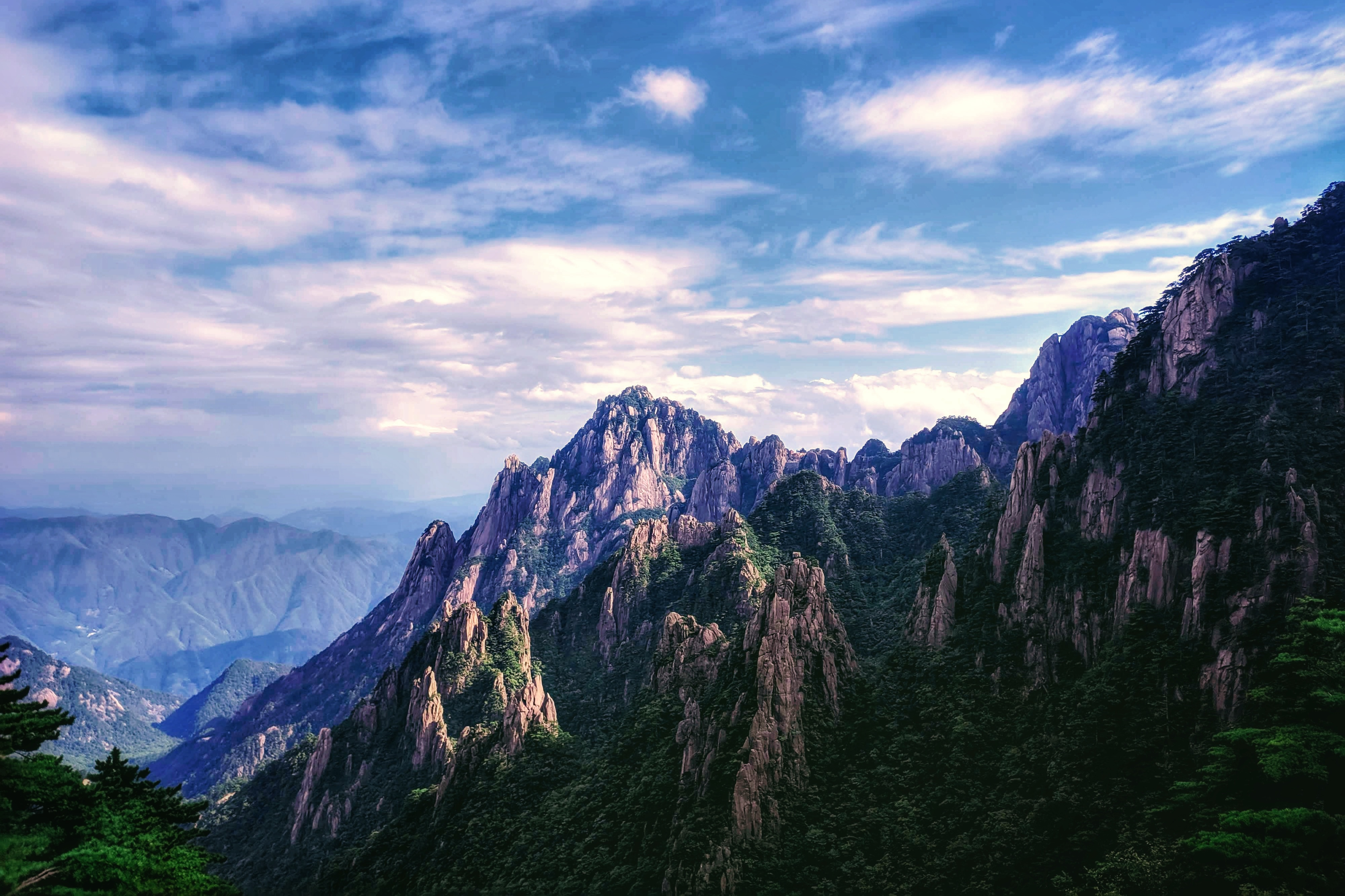
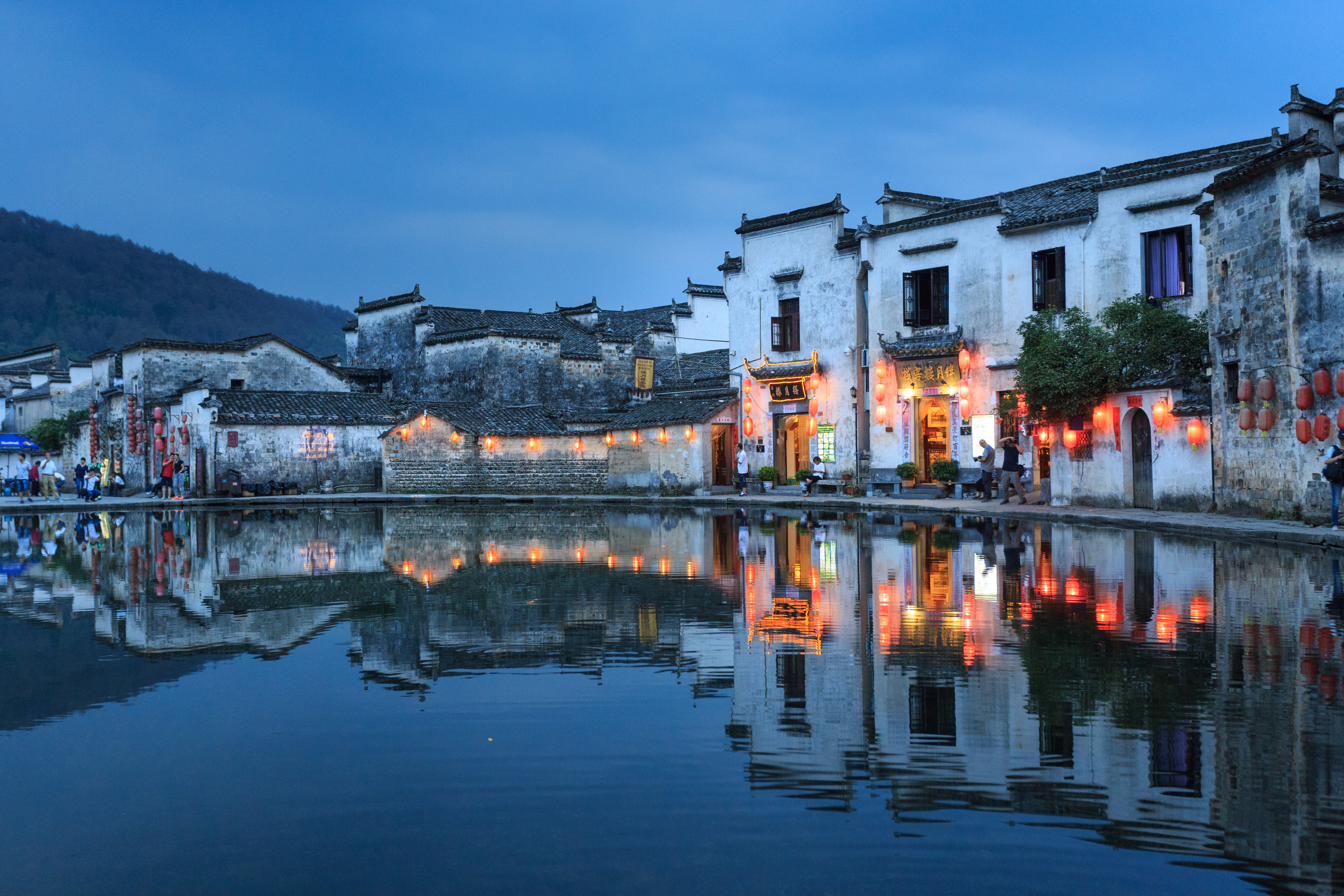
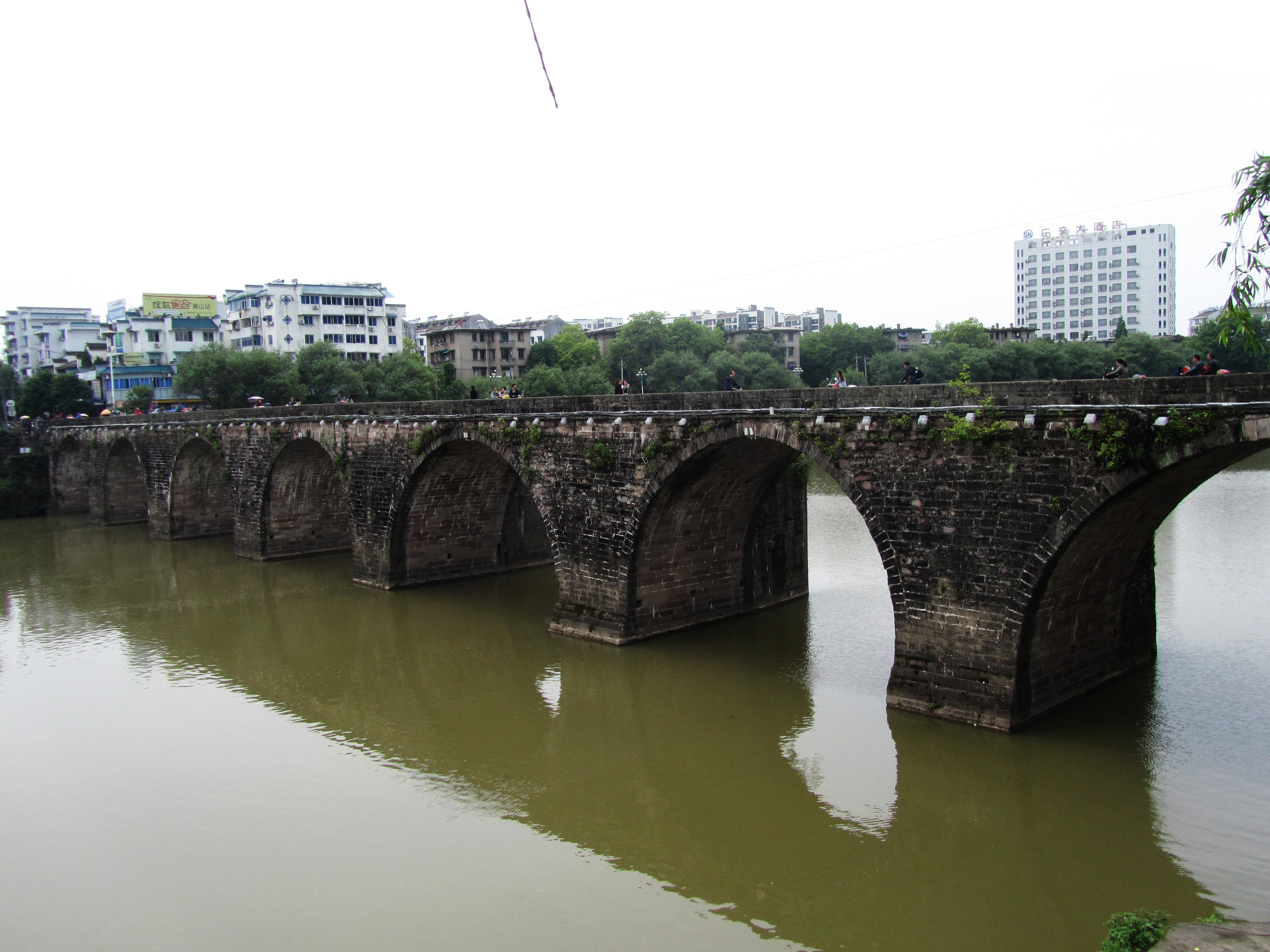
- Clockwise from top: The reconstructed old town on Song Street, Huangshan, the upper stream of Xinan river, the ancient village of Hongcun

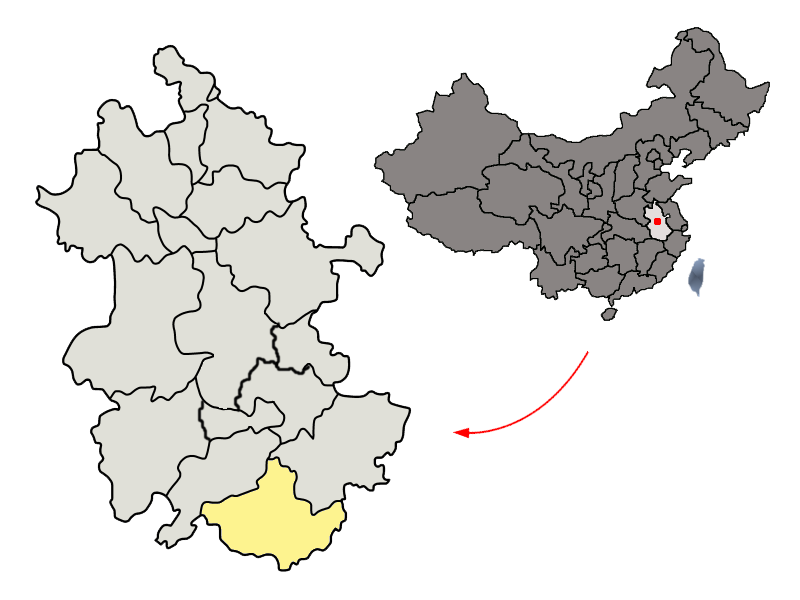
- Coordinates (Huangshan municipal government): 29°42′54″N 118°20′15″E
- Country: People's Republic of China
- Province: Anhui
- County-level divisions: 7
- Township-level divisions: 145
- Municipal seat: Tunxi District

Government
  - CPC Secretary: Wang Qimin (王启敏)
  - Mayor: Li Hongming (李宏鸣)

Area
  - Prefecture-level city: 9,807.4 km^{2} (3,786.7 sq mi)

Population
  - Prefecture-level city: 1,470,000
  - Density: 150/km^{2} (388/sq mi)
  - Urban: 410,973
  - Metro: 410,973

GDP
  - Prefecture-level city: CN¥ 95.7 billion US$ 12.3 billion
  - Per capita: CN¥ 71,875; US$ 11,141
- Time zone: UTC+8 (CST)
- Postal code: 245000
- Area code: 0559
- ISO 3166 code: CN-AH-10
- License Plate Prefix: 皖J
- Website: www.huangshan.gov.cn

Huangshan (simplified Chinese: 黄山; traditional Chinese: 黃山; pinyin: Huángshān) is a prefecture-level city in southern Anhui Province, People's Republic of China. Huangshan means Yellow Mountain in Chinese and the city is named after the famously scenic Yellow Mountains which cover much of the city's vast geographic expanse. The prefectural city of Huangshan includes three urban districts and four counties. The urban center of Huangshan was originally the city of Tunxi and is now called Tunxi District. Locals still call the city Tunxi to distinguish the urban core from other parts of Huangshan. The population of Huangshan city, as of the end of 2021, was 1.332 million, with an urbanization rate of 59.25%, an increase of 0.96 percentage points over the previous year. By the end of 2021, the household population of Huangshan City will be 1,485,700, with an urbanization rate of 37.82%, an increase of 1.66 percentage points.

Huangshan occupies the southernmost part of Anhui. It is bordered by Chizhou to the northwest, Xuancheng to the northeast, Jiangxi Province to the southwest and Zhejiang Province to the southeast. Huangshan's history dates back to the time of the First Emperor. The city's current jurisdiction covers much of the historical and cultural region of Huizhou (徽州), which together with Anqing formed the name of Anhui Province. Huangshan is home to two UNESCO World Heritage Sites, Mount Huangshan and Hongcun and Xidi, the ancient villages of Southern Anhui. It is a major tourist destination in China.

== Administration ==
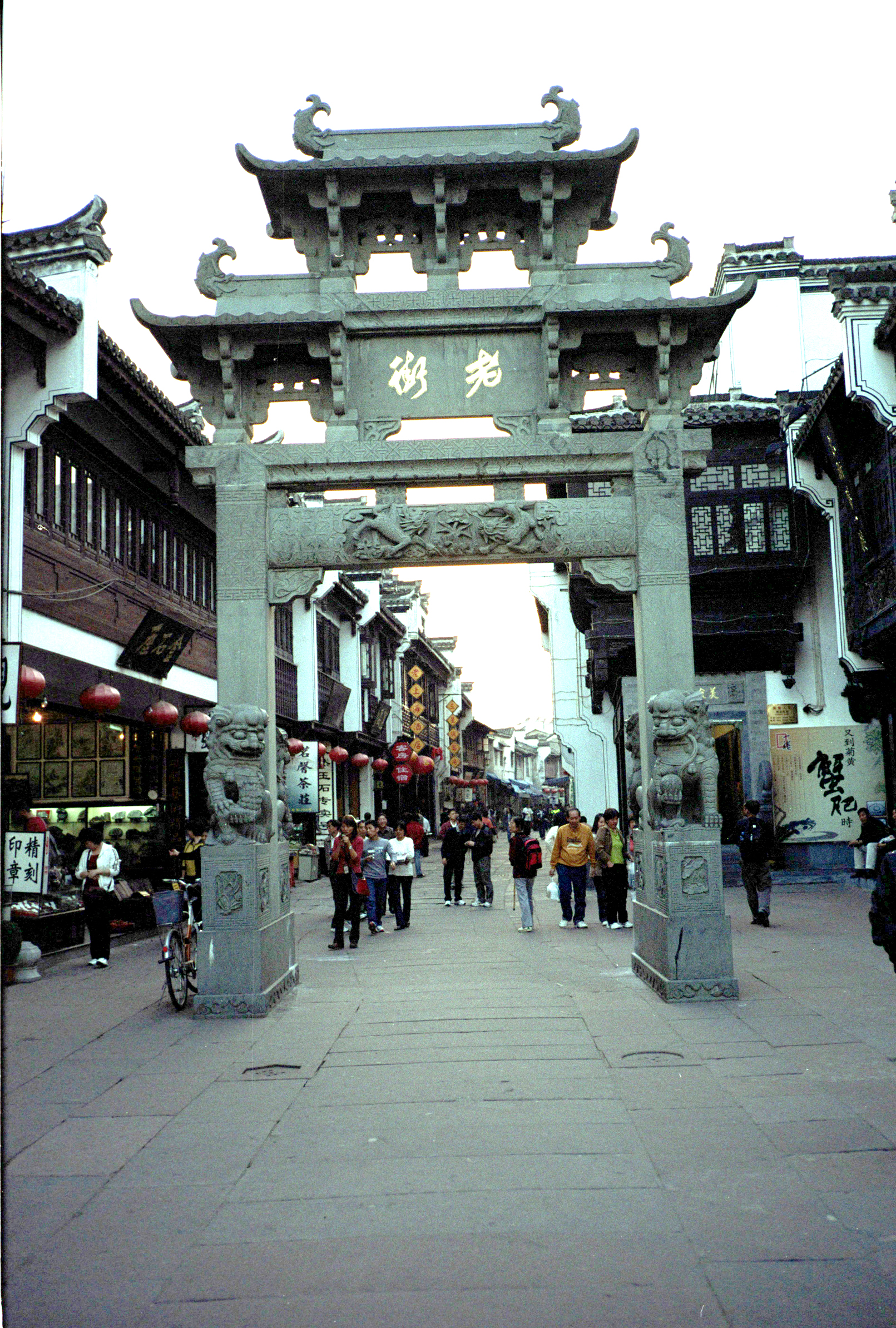
An old gate in the city

The prefecture-level city of Huangshan administers 7 county-level divisions, including 3 districts and 4 counties.

- Tunxi District (屯溪区)
- Huangshan District (黄山区)
- Huizhou District (徽州区)
- She County (歙县)
- Xiuning County (休宁县)
- Yi County (黟县)
- Qimen County (祁门县)

Map
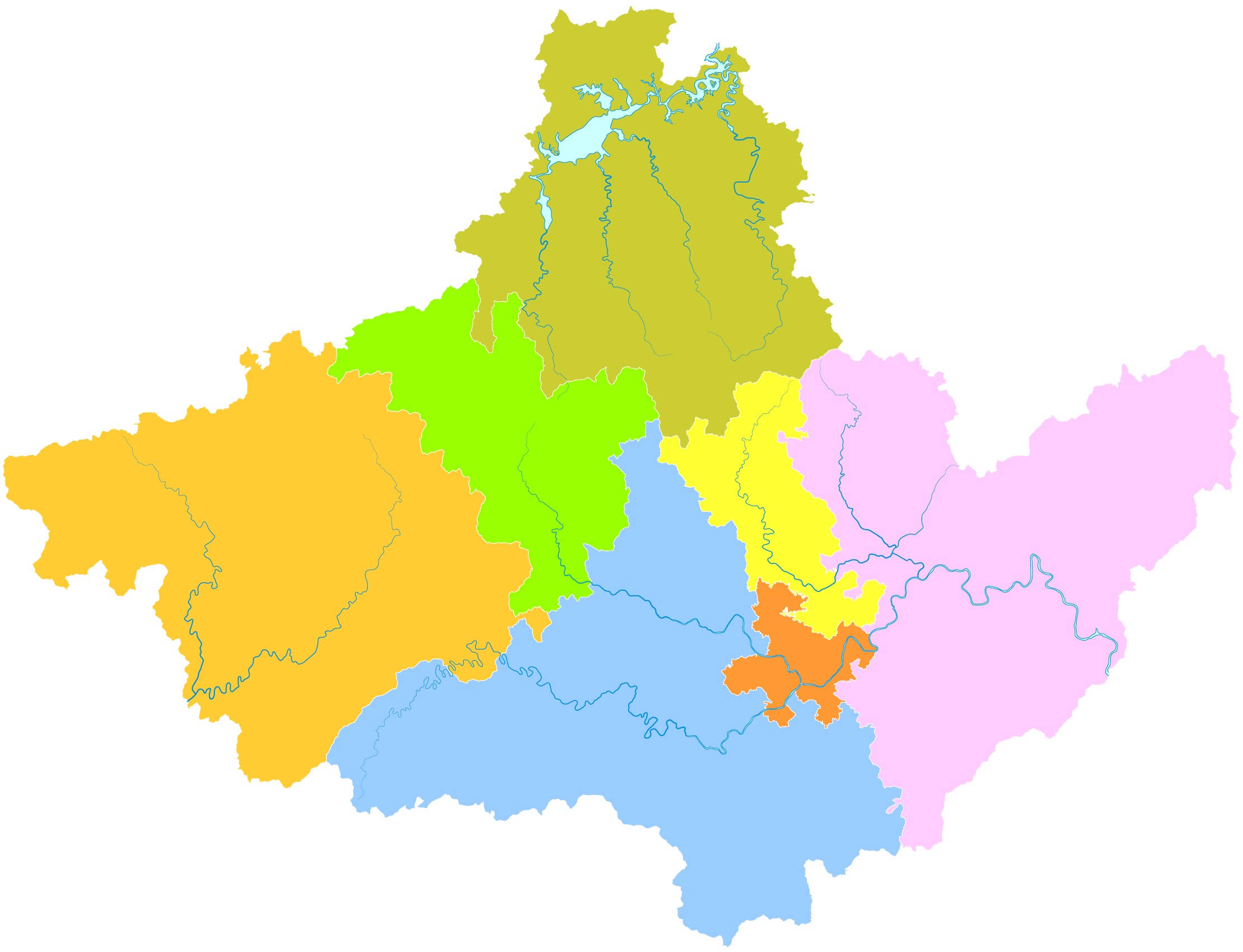

These are further divided into 145 township-level divisions, including 58 towns, 43 townships and 4 subdistricts.

== Geography and climate ==
Lower elevations of Huangshan City have a humid subtropical climate (Köppen Cfa), with short, cool winters and long, very hot and humid summers. At the central Tunxi District, the monthly mean temperature ranges from 4.4 °C (39.9 °F) in January to 28.1 °C (82.6 °F) in July, and the annual mean is 16.66 °C (62.0 °F). Precipitation is concentrated in spring and the earlier part of summer, and, at 1,739 mm (68.5 in) annually, is very high for the province, and more than double than the normal annual precipitation in northern parts of the province.

Climate data for Huangshan City (Tunxi District), elevation 143 m (469 ft), (1991–2020 normals, extremes 1981–2010)
| Month | Jan | Feb | Mar | Apr | May | Jun | Jul | Aug | Sep | Oct | Nov | Dec | Year |
|---|---|---|---|---|---|---|---|---|---|---|---|---|---|
| Record high °C (°F) | 22.7 (72.9) | 28.3 (82.9) | 35.1 (95.2) | 34.6 (94.3) | 36.6 (97.9) | 37.3 (99.1) | 39.5 (103.1) | 40.1 (104.2) | 39.2 (102.6) | 36.6 (97.9) | 30.5 (86.9) | 22.7 (72.9) | 40.1 (104.2) |
| Mean daily maximum °C (°F) | 9.4 (48.9) | 12.4 (54.3) | 16.8 (62.2) | 23.0 (73.4) | 27.7 (81.9) | 29.7 (85.5) | 33.6 (92.5) | 33.5 (92.3) | 29.7 (85.5) | 24.5 (76.1) | 18.3 (64.9) | 11.9 (53.4) | 22.5 (72.6) |
| Daily mean °C (°F) | 4.7 (40.5) | 7.2 (45.0) | 11.3 (52.3) | 17.2 (63.0) | 22.0 (71.6) | 25.0 (77.0) | 28.3 (82.9) | 27.9 (82.2) | 24.1 (75.4) | 18.5 (65.3) | 12.3 (54.1) | 6.4 (43.5) | 17.1 (62.7) |
| Mean daily minimum °C (°F) | 1.6 (34.9) | 3.7 (38.7) | 7.4 (45.3) | 12.9 (55.2) | 17.7 (63.9) | 21.4 (70.5) | 24.4 (75.9) | 24.1 (75.4) | 20.2 (68.4) | 14.2 (57.6) | 8.3 (46.9) | 2.7 (36.9) | 13.2 (55.8) |
| Record low °C (°F) | −7.6 (18.3) | −6.7 (19.9) | −4.2 (24.4) | 0.8 (33.4) | 8.6 (47.5) | 12.6 (54.7) | 18.1 (64.6) | 17.8 (64.0) | 10.0 (50.0) | 1.8 (35.2) | −3.9 (25.0) | −15.5 (4.1) | −15.5 (4.1) |
| Average precipitation mm (inches) | 92.5 (3.64) | 110.9 (4.37) | 174.7 (6.88) | 207.8 (8.18) | 241.9 (9.52) | 380.6 (14.98) | 221.3 (8.71) | 125.6 (4.94) | 79.4 (3.13) | 53.4 (2.10) | 74.9 (2.95) | 60.9 (2.40) | 1,823.9 (71.8) |
| Average precipitation days (≥ 0.1 mm) | 13.4 | 13.0 | 16.4 | 14.9 | 14.6 | 17.0 | 12.5 | 12.3 | 8.9 | 7.3 | 10.0 | 9.7 | 150 |
| Average snowy days | 3.7 | 2.1 | 0.6 | 0 | 0 | 0 | 0 | 0 | 0 | 0 | 0.2 | 1.3 | 7.9 |
| Average relative humidity (%) | 80 | 79 | 78 | 77 | 77 | 82 | 78 | 78 | 77 | 76 | 80 | 79 | 78 |
| Mean monthly sunshine hours | 92.5 | 93.5 | 110.1 | 132.8 | 153.4 | 125.5 | 202.3 | 196.0 | 167.4 | 159.9 | 123.8 | 118.8 | 1,676 |
| Percentage possible sunshine | 29 | 30 | 30 | 34 | 36 | 30 | 47 | 48 | 46 | 45 | 39 | 37 | 38 |
Source: China Meteorological Administration

== Economy ==
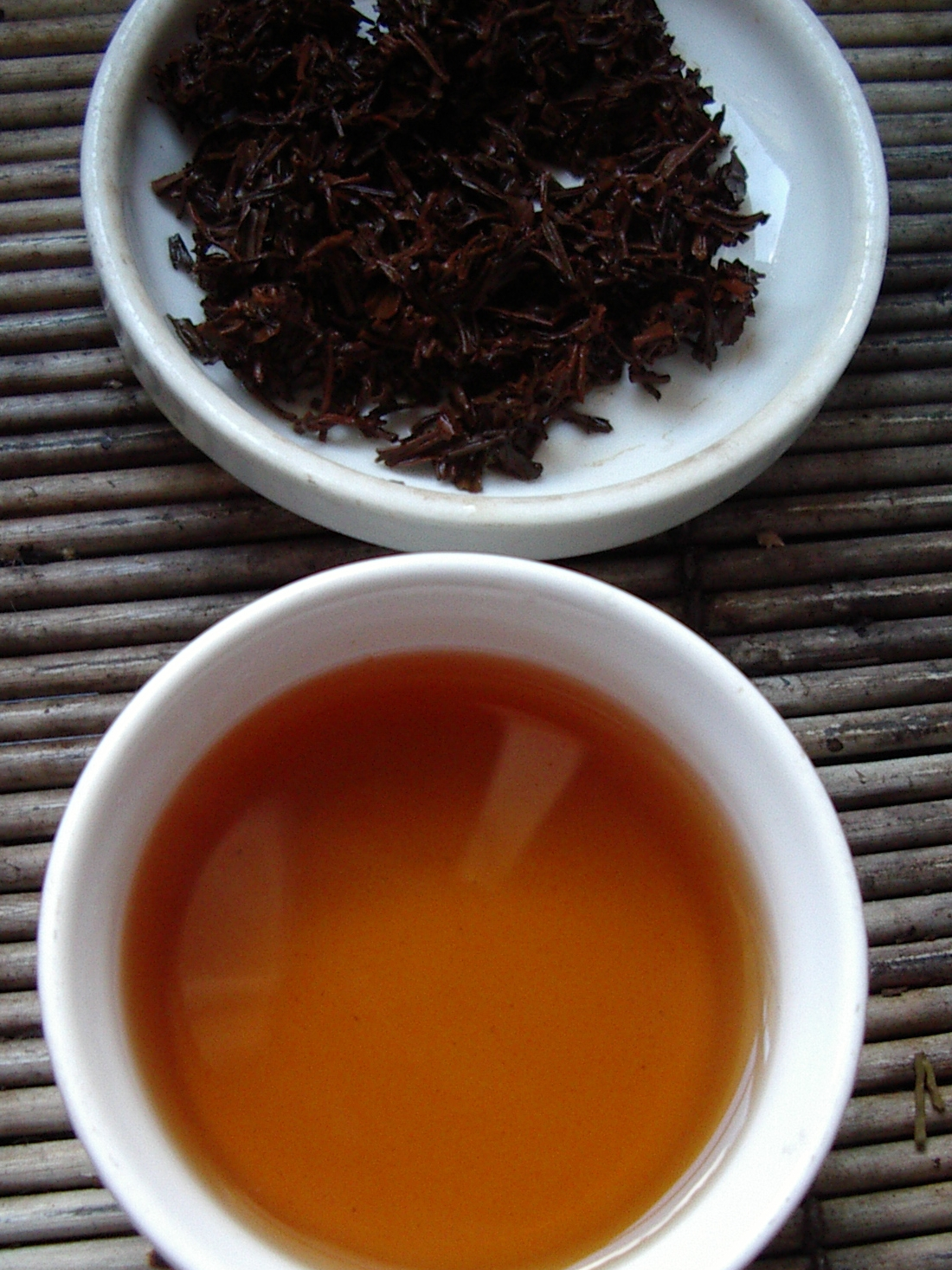
Keemun tea

Huangshan is famous for its tea, including Keemun tea, which is produced in Qimen County, and Maofeng green tea. The city is also home to significant tourism, centered on Mount Huang and including other scenic and historic sites (such as Xidi and Hongcun), which it has promoted to international markets in recent years.

== Transportation ==
Due to rugged terrain, Huangshan was historically a secluded region. The Xinan River provided an outlet to the east. Winding, narrow roads through Huang Mountains made trips to Xuancheng, Wuhu, Guichi and the Yangtze River slow and arduous. In recent decades, improvements to the transportation infrastructure have made the city and its surrounding tourist attractions more accessible.

=== Air ===
The Huangshan Tunxi International Airport, also referred to as the Tunxi Airport, is located in Tunxi District and is known by the IATA abbreviation TXN. The airport was opened in October 1959, and has been expanded five times, including an expansion in 2000. The airport offers regular flights to cities across China, as well as Seoul, Hong Kong, and Taipei. The airport also offers chartered flights to Incheon, Nagasaki, Osaka, Fukuoka, and other regional destinations.

=== Rail ===
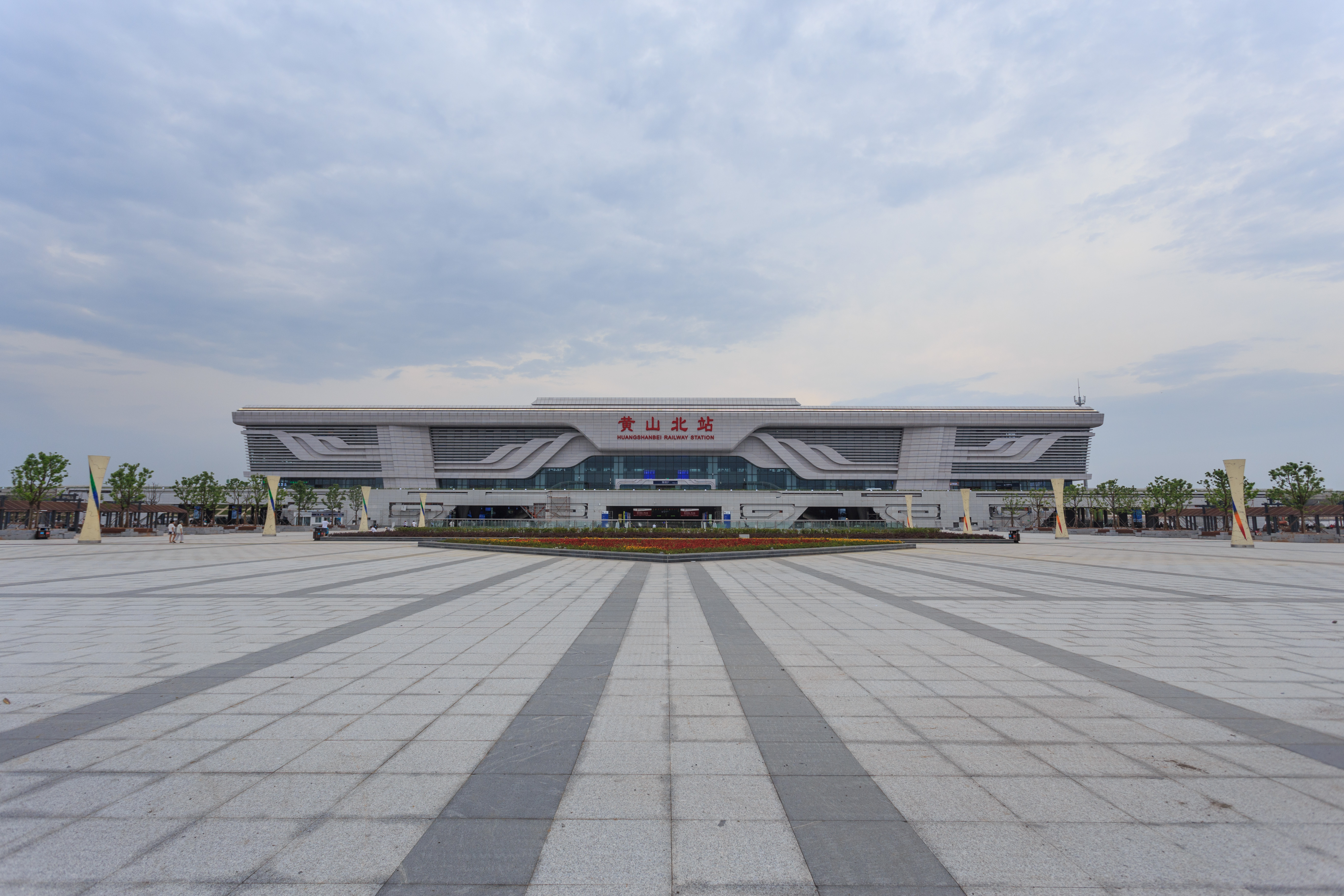
Huangshan North station

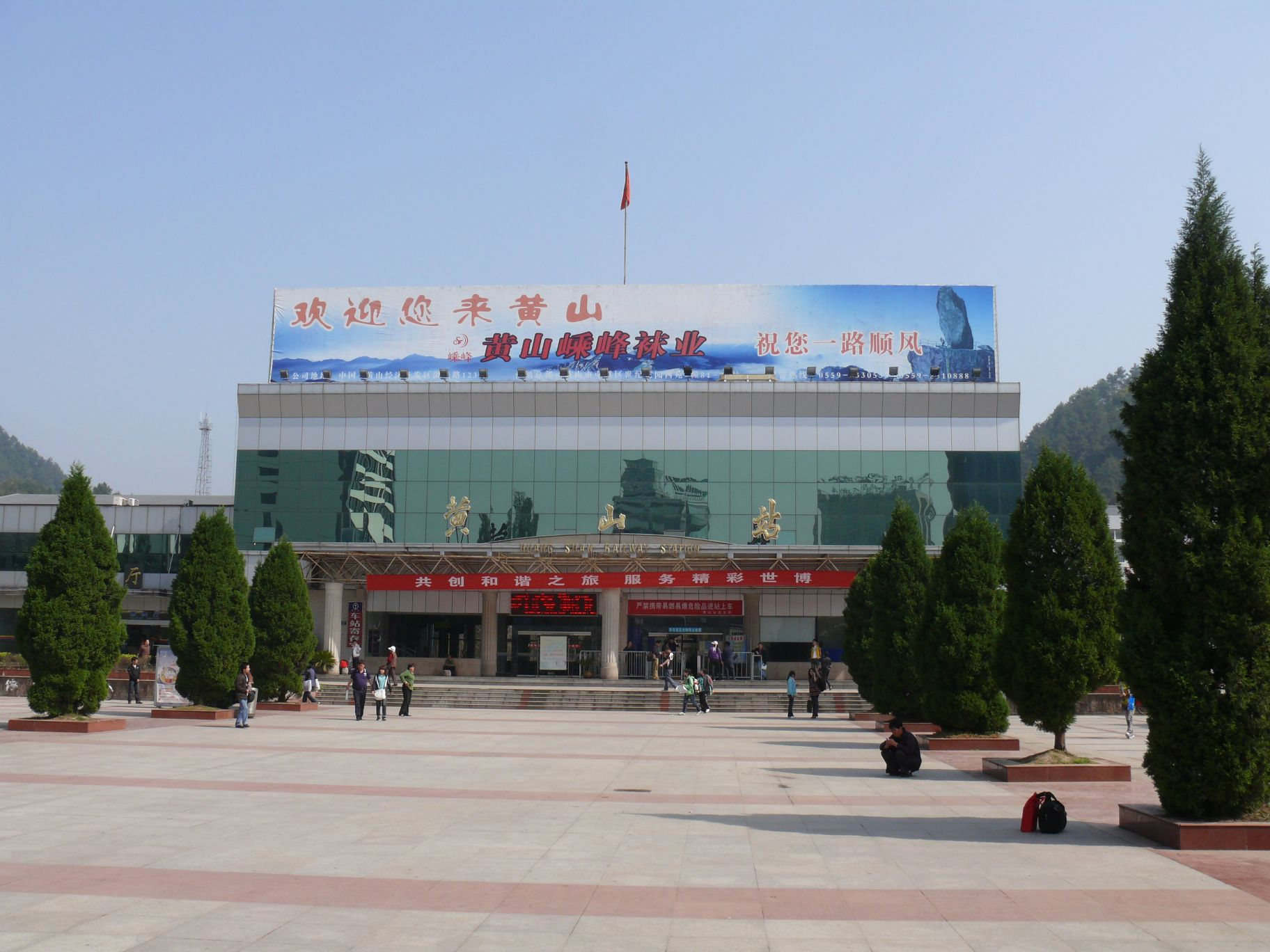
Huangshan Station, now not used by long-distance services

Huangshan's main passenger station is now Huangshan North station, which is accessible via high-speed rail over the Hefei–Fuzhou high-speed railway, the Hangzhou–Nanchang high-speed railway and the Chizhou–Huangshan high-speed railway. Trains run from Huangshan to many cities.

Until 2015, Huangshan City was served by one railway line, the Anhui–Jiangxi Railway. The line, which was completed in 1982 and has stations in Jixi County, She County, Tunxi District, Xiuning County, and Qimen County. Trains formerly ran from Huangshan Station in Tunxi to Nanjing, Shanghai, Bengbu, Huaibei, Qingdao and Beijing among other cities in the north, and stops in the south included Jingdezhen, Yingtan, Fuzhou, Xiamen, Guangzhou, Shenzhen, and Kunming. No long-distance passenger services now run on this route.

=== Road ===
Major expressways which pass through Huangshan City include the G56 Hangzhou–Ruili Expressway, the G3 Beijing–Taipei Expressway, and National Route G205.

The Hefei-Tongling-Huangshan Expressway heads north to Tongling on the Yangtze River and then to Hefei, the provincial capital of Anhui. The Huangshan-Taling-Taolin Expressway and Anhui Provincial Route S326, also pass through the city.

== Cultural history ==
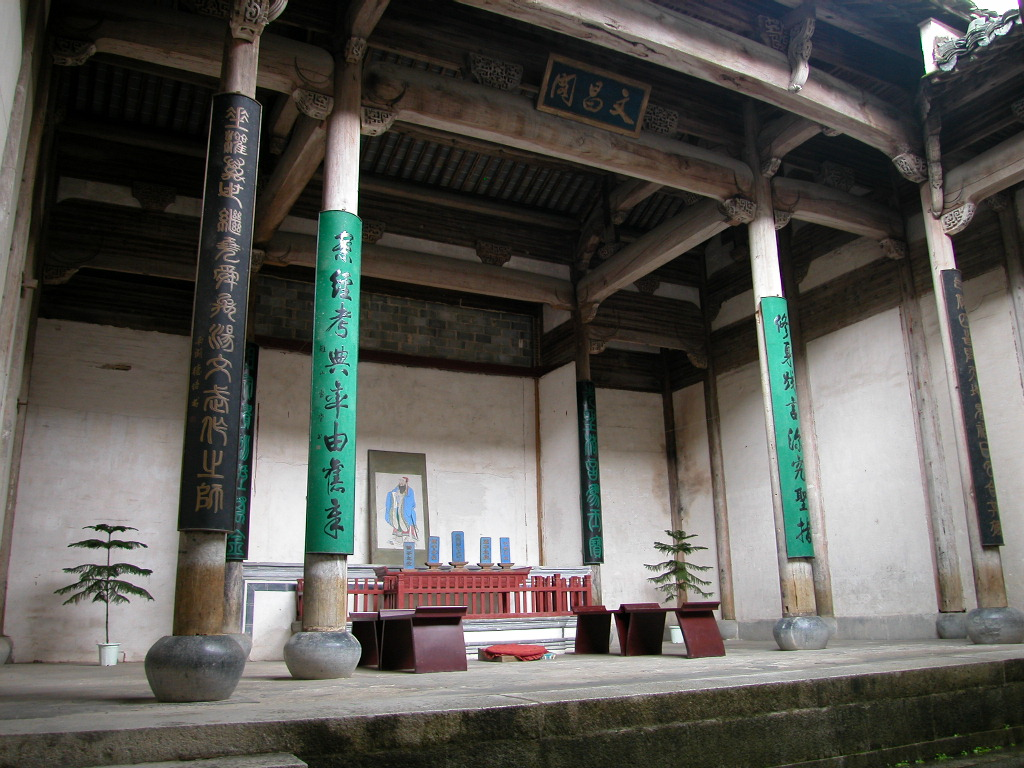
Ancient Villages in Southern Anhui – Xidi and Hongcun.

In the Ming dynasty, Zheng Zhizhen (鄭之珍; 1518–1595), a native of Qimen County, wrote the opera Mulian Rescues His Mother. According to local legend, Zheng was blind when he wrote the opera and was restored to full sight by a grateful Guanyin (the legend also has it that when Zheng later wrote a love story he went blind again).

In 2011, local authorities promoted performance of the Ming dynasty play Mulian Rescues His Mother as a tourist attraction.

== Notable people ==
- Zhang Rongqiao (b.1966), physicist and aerospace engineer, served as the chief designer of Tianwen-1 Mars mission
- Gloria Ai (b.1987), business anchorwoman and author

== International relations ==
Huangshan City is twinned with:

- Serravalle, San Marino (1999)

== Other notes ==
In early 2008, the BBC broadcast a series of 5 documentaries on life for schoolchildren in China, called "Chinese School". One of the three schools documented was Xiuning High School, the top school in the county. This was situated in the town of Xiuning, in the county of Xiuning in Huangshan.

== See also ==
- Chinese frigate Huangshan
