= Sanyang railway station =

Railway station in Hangzhou, Zhejiang

Sanyang 三阳
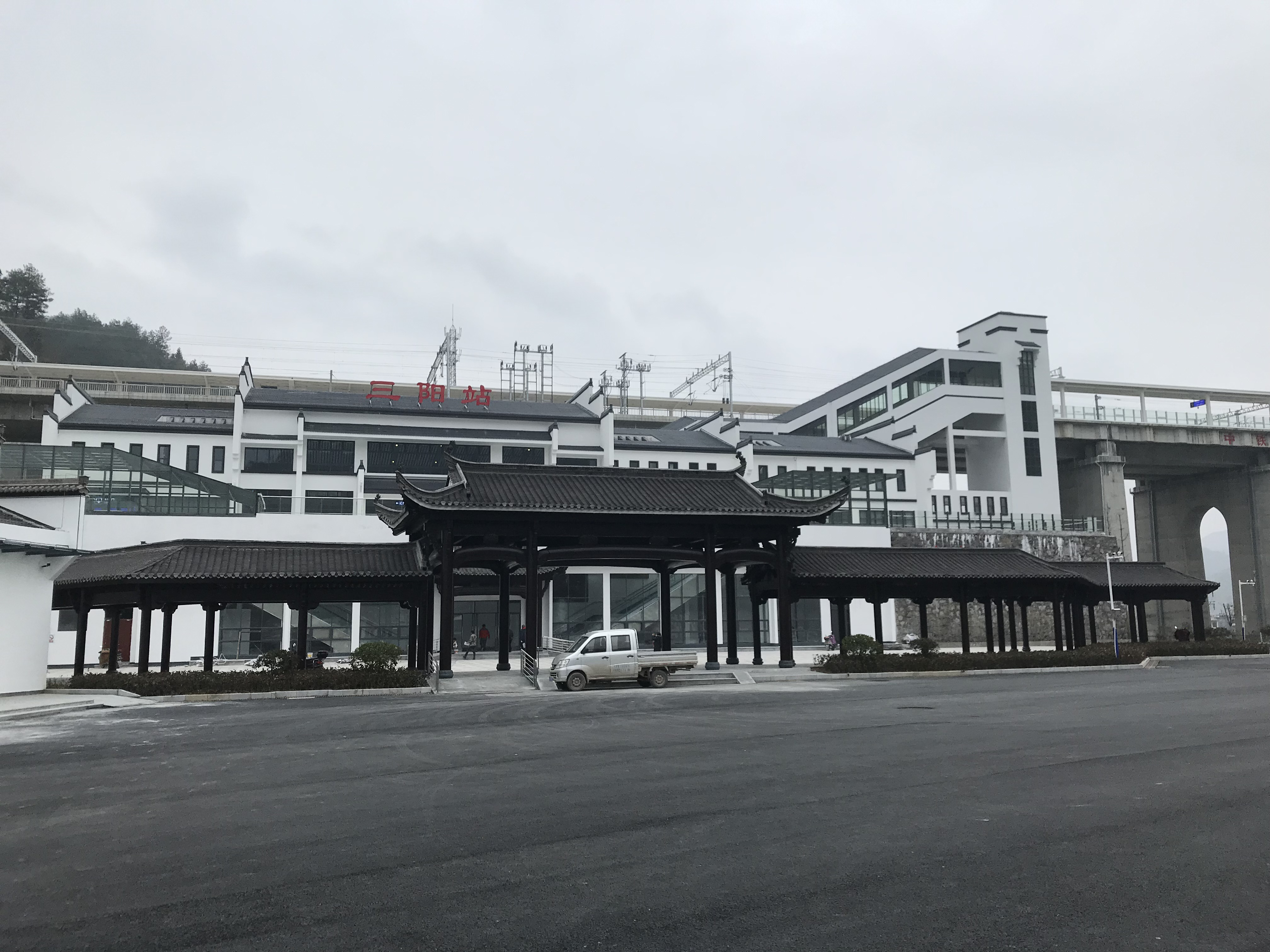
- Exterior of the station

General information
- Location: Shexian County, Huangshan, Anhui; China
- Coordinates: 30.029526°N 118.801888°E
- Line: Hangzhou–Huangshan intercity railway

History
- Opened: December 25, 2018
Location

Sanyang railway station (Chinese: 三阳站) is a railway station in Shexian County, Huangshan, Anhui, China. It opened on 25 December 2018 along with the Hangzhou–Huangshan intercity railway.

Preceding station	China Railway High-speed	Following station
Qiandaohu towards Hangzhou East	Hangzhou–Huangshan intercity railway	Jixi North towards Huangshan North
