= Hangzhou–Nanchang high-speed railway =

High-speed railway line in China

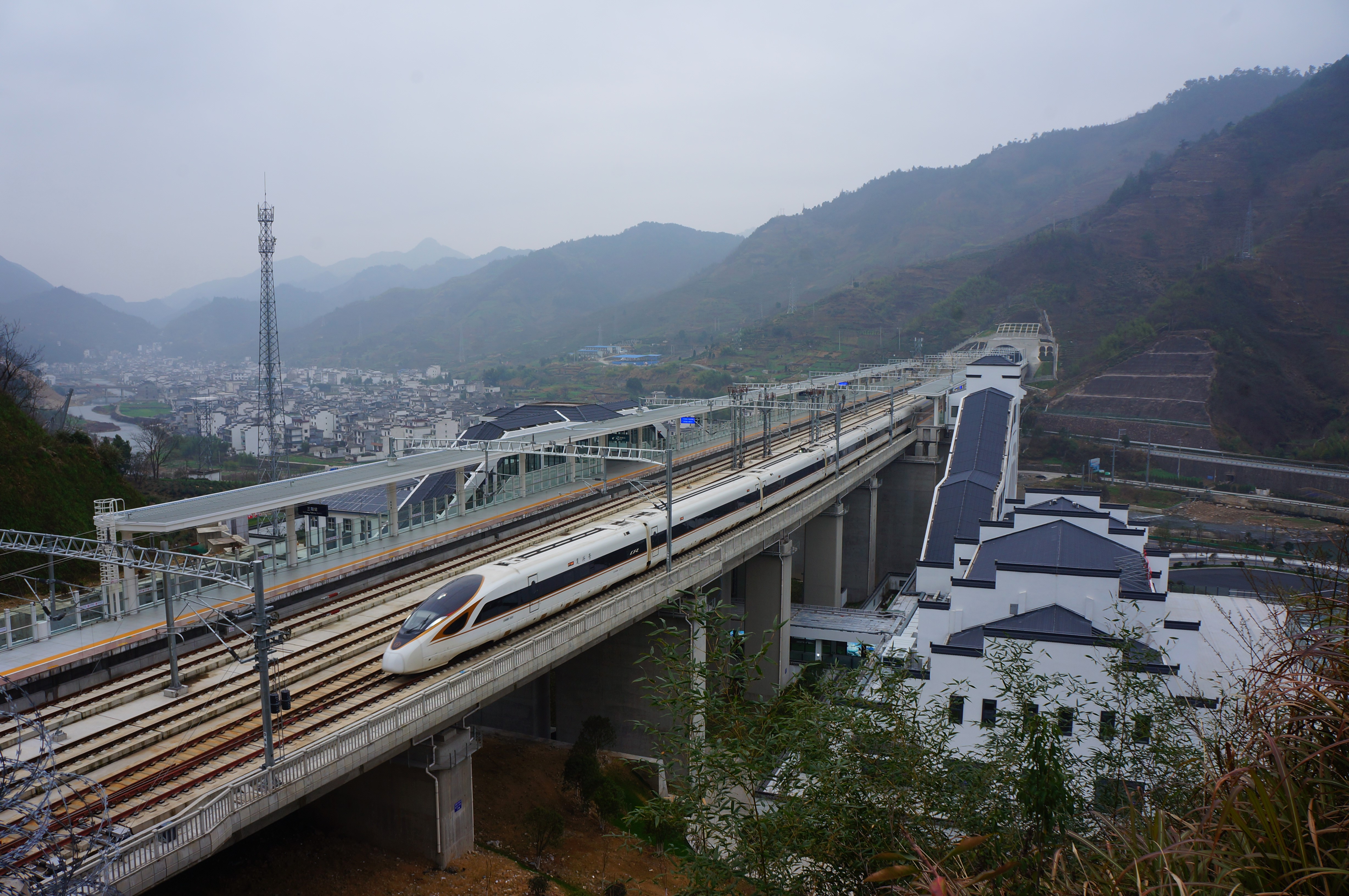
- A CR400BF train at Sanyang railway station

Overview
- Other names: Hanghuang HSR (Chinese: 杭昌高速铁路; pinyin: Háng chāng gāosù tiělù)
- Status: operational
- Locale: Zhejiang, Anhui, Jiangxi, People's Republic of China
- Termini: Hangzhou East; Nanchang East
- Stations: 19

Service
- Type: High-speed rail
- Rolling stock: CR400BF

History
- Opened: 25 December 2018; 27 December 2023

Technical
- Line length: 576 km (357.91 mi)
- Number of tracks: 2
- Track gauge: 1,435 mm (4 ft 8 1/2 in)
- Electrification: Overhead lines (AC 25 kV)
- Operating speed: 250 km/h (160 mph) (Hangzhou–Huangshan section); 350 km/h (220 mph) (Huangshan–Nanchang section)

Hangzhou–Nanchang high-speed railway or Hangchāng HSR (Chinese: 杭昌高速铁路; pinyin: Háng chāng gāosù tiělù) is a dual-track, electrified, high-speed rail line between Hangzhou, Zhejiang, Huangshan, Anhui and Nanchang, Jiangxi. It can be divided into the Hangzhou–Huangshan section (Hangzhou–Huangshan HSR or Hanghuang HSR) and the Huangshan–Nanchang section (Nanchang–Huangshan HSR or Changjinghuang HSR).

The Hangzhou-Huangshan section runs 265 km (165 mi) through northwestern Zhejiang and southern Anhui and accommodates trains traveling at speeds up to 250 km/h (160 mph). Travel time from Hangzhou to Huangshan was reduced to about one and one-half hours. The line is the first rail link between the two cities and brings counties in mountainous southern Anhui closer to the Yangtze River Delta region. Construction began on 30 June 2014, and the line opened on 25 December 2018.

The Huangshan–Nanchang section is located in northeast Jiangxi and southern Anhui. It starts from Nanchang City, Jiangxi Province in the west, passes through Jingdezhen City, and ends in Huangshan City, Anhui Province in the east. The main line is 290 km (180 mi)-long and the connecting line is 29 km (18 mi)-long. The total investment approved in the preliminary design of the project was 47.045 billion yuan. It was built as passenger dedicated line and a maximum operating speed of 350 km/h (220 mph). It opened to traffic on 27 December 2023.

== Route ==
The high-speed rail line connects southern Anhui Province with Hangzhou, on the eastern seaboard, via northwestern Zhejiang province. Cities and counties along the route include Hangzhou, Xiaoshan, Fuyang, Tonglu, Jiande, Chun'an in Zhejiang, and Jixi, She County, Huangshan, Yixian, Qimen, Fuliang, Jingdezhen, Leping, Poyang, Yugan, Jinxian and Nanchang. Scenic sites along route include Huangshan (Yellow Mountain), the "Porcelain Capital" of Jingdezhen, the ancient villages in southern Anhui, Qiandao Lake, and Hangzhou.

To scale map of the Hanghuang HSR

Station name	Location		Distance from Hangzhou East station	Rail connections	Metro connections	Platforms
Hangzhou East	Hangzhou, Zhejiang	Shangcheng	0	Shanghai–Kunming HSR; Hangzhou–Ningbo HSR; Shanghai–Kunming railway Shanghai–Kunming railway	Hangzhou Metro, line 1 Hangzhou Metro, line 4 Hangzhou Metro, line 6 Hangzhou Metro, line 19	15 platforms and 30 tracks
Hangzhou South	Hangzhou, Zhejiang	Xiaoshan	16	Shanghai–Kunming HSR; Hangzhou–Ningbo HSR; Shanghai–Kunming railway Xiaoshan–Ningbo railway	Hangzhou Metro, line 5	7 platforms and 21 tracks
Fuyang	Hangzhou, Zhejiang	Fuyang	61			2 platforms and 4 tracks
Tonglu	Hangzhou, Zhejiang	Tonglu	99	Shangqiu–Hangzhou HSR		2 platforms and 4 tracks
Jiande	Hangzhou, Zhejiang	Jiande	138	Jinhua–Jiande HSR; Hangzhou–Quzhou HSR		2 platforms and 5 tracks
Qiandaohu	Hangzhou, Zhejiang	Chun'an	169			2 platforms and 6 tracks
Sanyang	Huangshan, Anhui	She County	218			2 platforms and 4 tracks
Jixi North	Xuancheng, Anhui	Jixi County	247	Hefei–Fuzhou HSR		5 platforms and 14 tracks
Shexian North	Huangshan, Anhui	She County	270	Hefei–Fuzhou HSR		3 platforms and 8 tracks
Huangshan North	Huangshan, Anhui	Tunxi District	288	Hefei–Fuzhou HSR		7 platforms and 17 tracks
Yixian East	Huangshan, Anhui	Yi County	312	Chizhou–Huangshan HSR		2 platforms and 8 tracks
Qimen South	Huangshan, Anhui	Qimen County	347			2 platforms and 4 tracks
Fuliang East	Jingdezhen, Jiangxi	Fuliang County	390			2 platforms and 4 tracks
Jingdezhen North	Jingdezhen, Jiangxi	Zhushan	420	Jiujiang–Quzhou railway		5 platforms and 13 tracks
Leping North	Jingdezhen, Jiangxi	Leping	450			2 platforms and 4 tracks
Poyang	Shangrao, Jiangxi	Poyang County	481			2 platforms and 8 tracks
Yugan	Shangrao, Jiangxi	Yugan County	510			2 platforms and 4 tracks
Jinxian North	Nanchang, Jiangxi	Jinxian County	541			2 platforms and 4 tracks
Nanchang East	Nanchang, Jiangxi	Qingshanhu	576	Nanchang–Jiujiang HSR; Nanchang–Ganzhou HSR	Nanchang Metro, line 2 (eastern extension, under construction)	6 platforms and 13 tracks

== History ==
The Hangzhou–Huangshan HSR project was initially approved by the State Development and Planning Commission in July 2010. Construction was to begin later in that year and was scheduled to be completed by as early as 2013. After two rounds of environmental assessments of surveys in 2010 and 2011, the project was revised. In August 2013, planners announced that the route would run 183.4 km (114.0 mi) in Zhejiang and 81.7 km (50.8 mi) in Anhui with 10 stations, including eight new stations. Two stations, Shexian South and Sanyang, were added to the original plan, which had Hangzhou East, Hangzhou South, Fuyang, Tonglu, Jiande, Chun'an, Jixi North, and Huangshan North. The Jiande-to-Jixi section of the line would use seamless steel rails laid on a concrete rail bed. The Hangzhou South-to-Jiande and Jixi-to-Huangshan sections would have rail laid on conventional gravel beds. The design speed of the railway was changed from an initial speed of 250 km/h (155 mph) with expansion capability for 350 km/h (220 mph) operation to 250 km/h (155 mph) without any expansion capability to higher speeds. Construction began on June 30, 2014, and the line was opened on December 25, 2018.

=== Huangshan–Nanchang section ===
In early 2015, the city of Jingdezhen proposed to include a Huangshan–Nanchang high-speed railway in the national plan. On 13 July 2016, the national government issued a notice on the issuance of the "Medium and Long-Term Railway Network Plan". The Medium and Long-Term Railway Network Plan (2016) in the notice confirmed the construction of the Nanchang–Jingdezhen–Huangshan section of the high-speed railway connecting line.

On 21 June 2018, the Second Public Notice and Simplified Version of the Environmental Impact Assessment of the New Nanchang–Jingdezhen–Huangshan Railway was published. On 9 July, the Full Public Notice of the Environmental Impact Report of the New Nanchang-Jingdezhen-Huangshan Railway was published. On 27 September, the Ministry of Ecology and Environment approved the project. On 17 October, the preliminary design of the project was jointly approved by China Railway, Jiangxi Provincial People's Government, and Anhui Provincial People's Government.

On 25 December 25, Jiangxi Provincial Party Secretary Liu Qi and Governor Yi Lianhong attended the ground breaking ceremony for the construction of the Huangshan–Nanchang high-speed railway (Jiangxi Section) in Jingdezhen. The total investment in the Jiangxi section is RMB 34.713 billion. The planned construction period was 4 years. It was expected to be completed and put into operation in April 2023.

On 26 April 2023, the entire Huangshan–Nanchang high-speed railway was completed. On 26 October, the entire line began trial operation.

On 27 December 2023, the Huangshan–Nanchang high-speed railway was officially opened to traffic. At that time, the fastest travel time from Nanchang to Jingdezhen was about 50 minutes, and the fastest travel time from Nanchang to Huangshan was 1 hour and 45 minutes.
