= Fuyang railway station =

Fuyang railway station may refer to:

- Fuyang railway station (Anhui) (阜阳站), a railway station in Yingdong District, Fuyang, Anhui, China.
- Fuyang railway station (Zhejiang) (富阳站), a railway station in Fuyang District, Hangzhou, Zhejiang, China.

== See also ==
- Fuyang West railway station (disambiguation)
