= Shexian North railway station =

Railway station in Huangshan, Anhui

Shexian North 歙县北
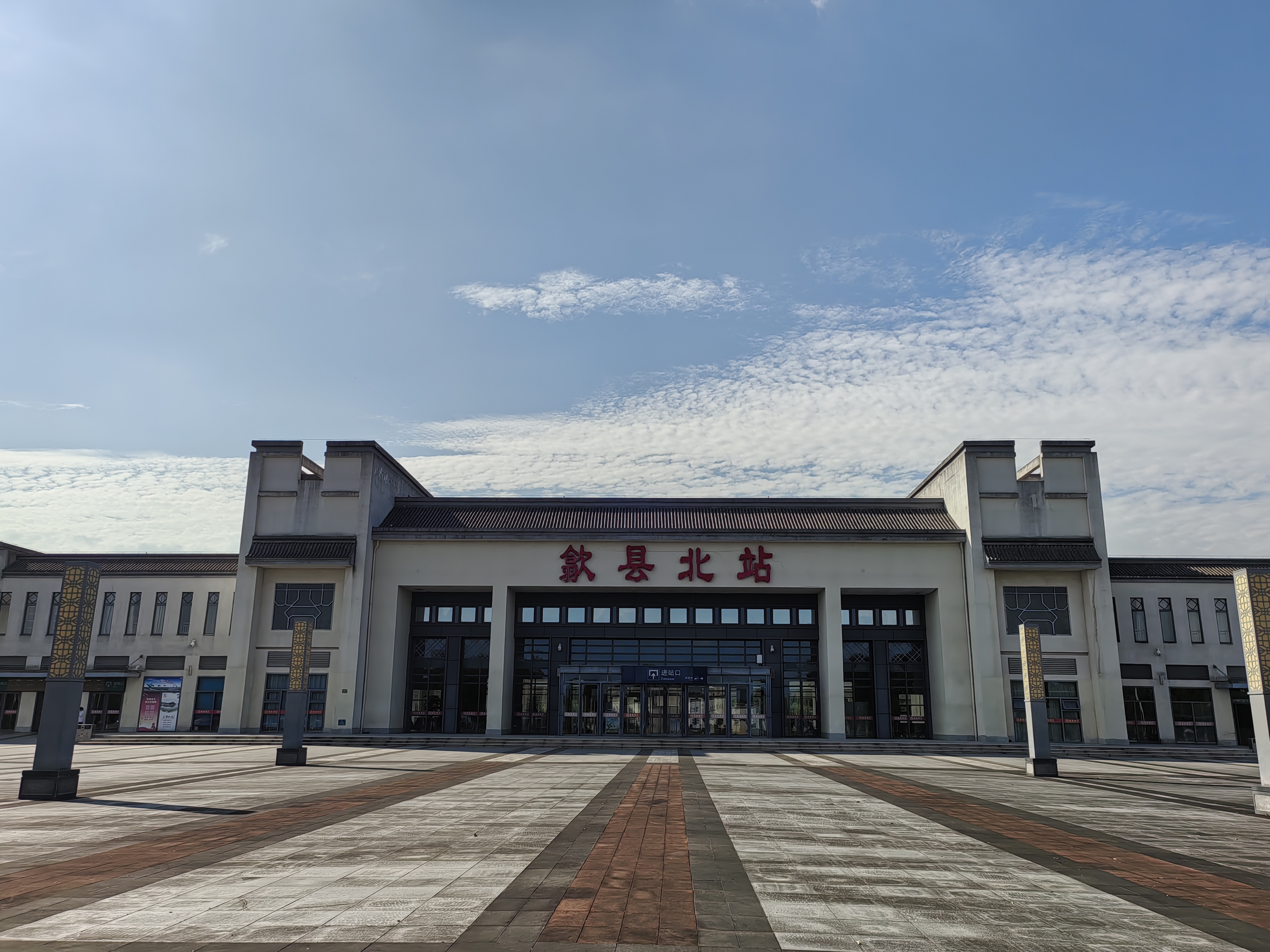

General information
- Location: Shexian County, Huangshan, Anhui; China
- Coordinates: 29°55′28.62″N 118°24′17.42″E
- Lines: Hefei–Fuzhou high-speed railway; Hangzhou–Huangshan intercity railway

History
- Opened: 28 June 2015
Location

Shexian North railway station (Chinese: 歙县北站) is a railway station in Shexian County, Huangshan, Anhui, China. It is an intermediate stop on both the Hefei–Fuzhou high-speed railway and the Hangzhou–Huangshan intercity railway.

Initially, no station was planned at this location. However, the station was later added to plans. The station opened with the Hefei–Fuzhou high-speed railway on 28 June 2015.

Preceding station	China Railway High-speed	Following station
Jixi North towards Hefei South	Hefei–Fuzhou high-speed railway	Huangshan North towards Fuzhou
Jixi North towards Hangzhou East	Hangzhou–Huangshan intercity railway	Huangshan North Terminus
