= Xuancheng railway station =

Railway station in Xuancheng, Anhui

Xuancheng 宣城
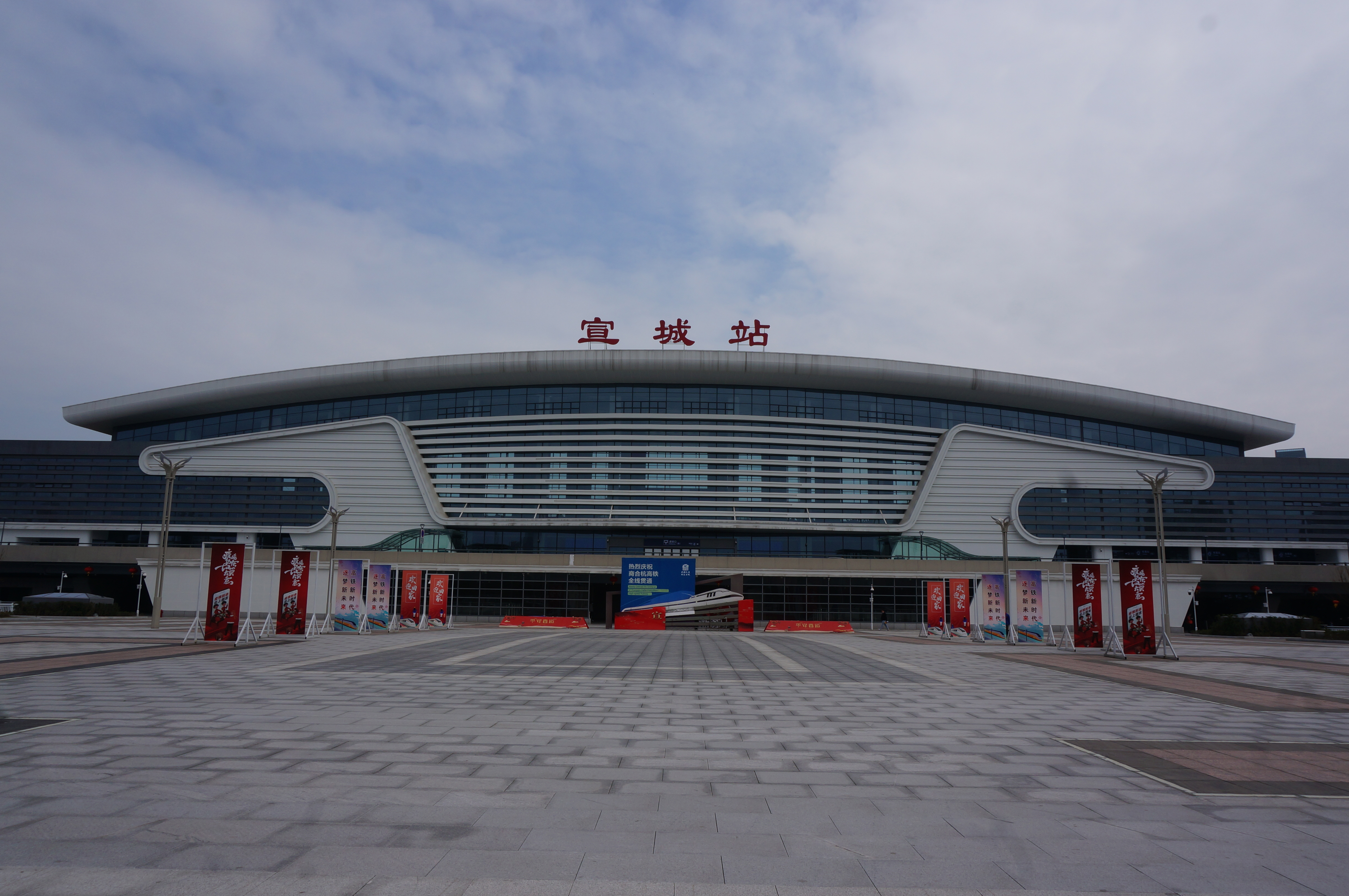
- Station building

General information
- Location: Xuanzhou District, Xuancheng, Anhui; China
- Coordinates: 30.95°N 118.77°E
- Lines: Anhui–Jiangxi railway; Xuancheng–Hangzhou railway; Shangqiu–Hangzhou high-speed railway; Xuancheng–Jixi high-speed railway

History
- Opened: January 1975
Location
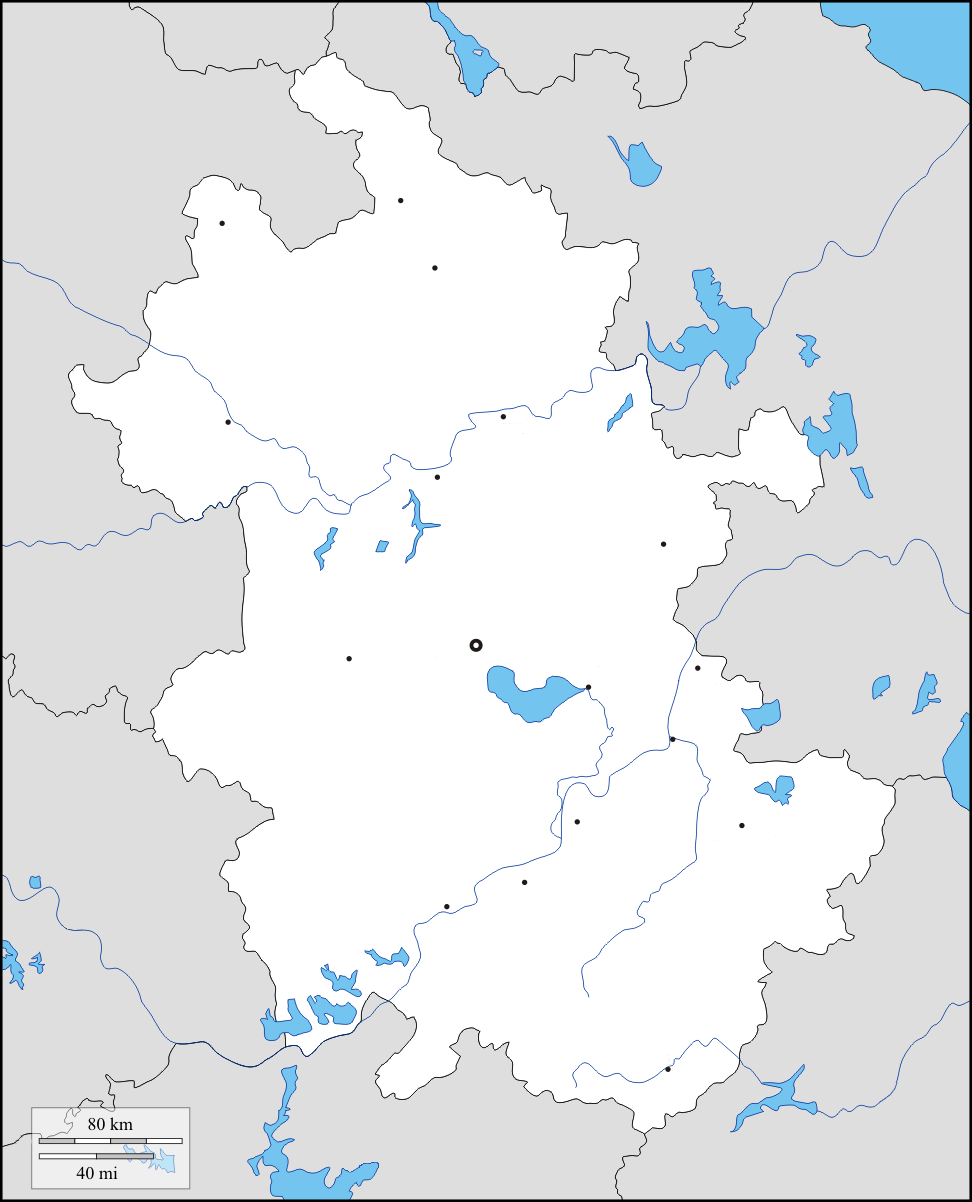
- Location within Anhui Location within China

Xuancheng railway station (Chinese: 宣城站; pinyin: Xuānchéng zhàn) is a railway station in Xuanzhou District, Xuancheng, Anhui, China.

== History ==
The present-day Xuancheng railway station site opened in January 1975.

Preceding station	China Railway	Following station
Xiangkouqiao towards Wuhu	Anhui–Jiangxi railway	Sunjiabu towards Yingtan
Terminus	Xuancheng–Hangzhou railway	Jianguo towards Hangzhou
Preceding station	China Railway High-speed	Following station
Wanzhi South towards Shangqiu	Shangqiu–Hangzhou high-speed railway	Langxi South towards Tonglu
Terminus	Xuancheng–Jixi high-speed railway	Ningguo South towards Jixi North
