= Fuyang West railway station =

Fuyang West railway station may refer to:

- Fuyang West railway station (Anhui) (阜阳西站), a railway station in Yingzhou District, Fuyang, Anhui, China.
- Fuyang West railway station (Zhejiang) (富阳西站), a railway station in Fuyang District, Hangzhou, Zhejiang, China.

== See also ==
- Fuyang railway station (disambiguation)
