= Yingzhou, Jixi County =

Town in Anhui, China

Coordinates: 30.0617°N 118.6451°E

Yingzhou (瀛洲镇) is a town in Jixi County, Anhui, China.

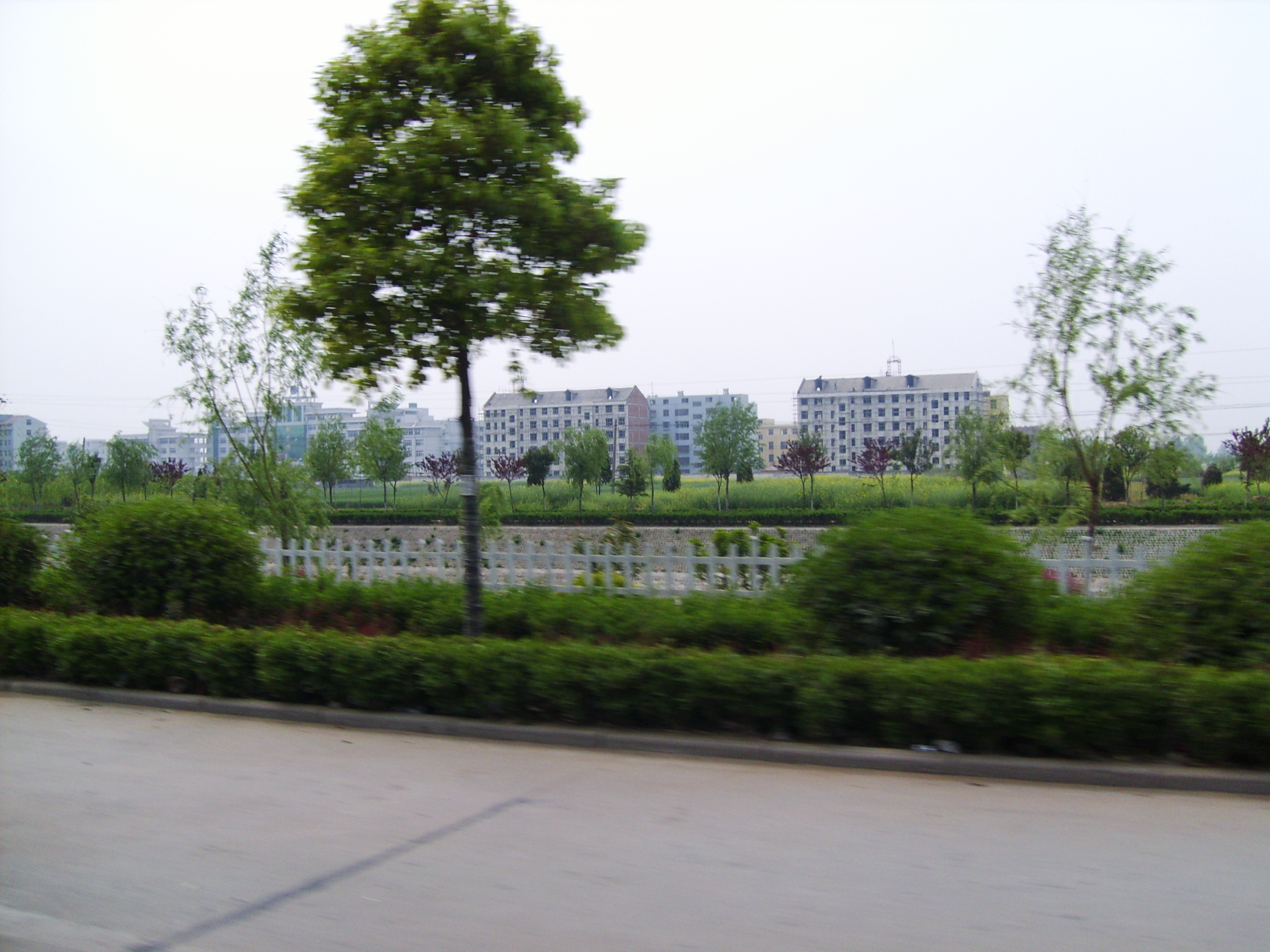
Yingzhou
