= Fuyang railway station (Zhejiang) =

Railway station in Hangzhou, Zhejiang

Fuyang 富阳
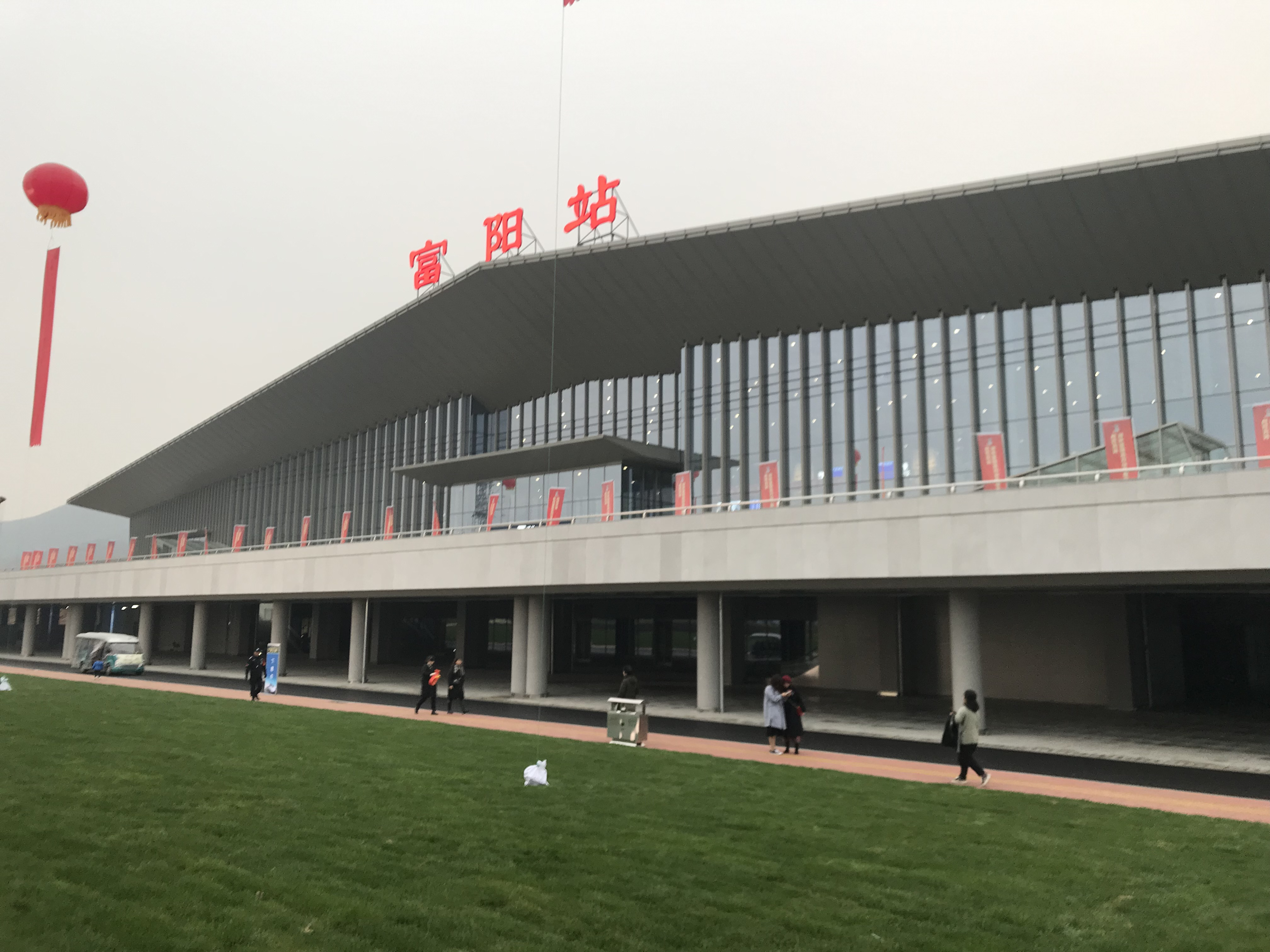
- Exterior of the station

General information
- Location: Fuyang District, Hangzhou, Zhejiang; China
- Coordinates: 30°0′12″N 119°59′17″E
- Line: Hangzhou–Huangshan intercity railway

History
- Opened: December 25, 2018
Location

Fuyang railway station (Chinese: 富阳站) is a railway station in Fuyang District, Hangzhou, Zhejiang, China. It opened on 25 December 2018 along with the Hangzhou–Huangshan intercity railway.

Construction of the station building started in January 2018.

== See also ==
- Fuyang West railway station (Zhejiang)

Preceding station	China Railway High-speed	Following station
Hangzhou South towards Hangzhou East	Hangzhou–Huangshan intercity railway	Tonglu towards Huangshan North
