= Gloria Ai =

Chinese broadcaster and businesswoman (born 1987)

Ai Cheng
- 艾诚
- Born: 15 February 1987 (age 39); Huangshan, Anhui, China
- Education: Harvard Kennedy School, Peking University, Communication University of China
- Occupations: Founder of iAsk Media, Venture Partner of SAIF

Ai Cheng (Chinese: 艾诚; born 15 February 1987), known professionally as Gloria Ai, is a Chinese bilingual business anchorwoman. She is the founder of iAsk Media, Venture Partner at SAIF Partners. Started her own business, iAsk Media, since 2014, focus on shows interviewing people made great contributions to the world. She was awarded as Global Shapers from World Economic Forum and Forbes 30 Under 30 Asia from Forbes.

== Early life ==
Ai was born in Huangshan, Anhui province in 1987. She then went on to Beijing, and later Boston to study. Upon graduation from Harvard, she became a New York-based business commentator for China Central Television before returning to China and founded iAsk Media.

== Career ==
Prior to Ai's entrepreneurial ventures, she was a business commentator at China Central Television Business Channel in New York and an Investment Policy Consultant at the International Finance Corporation in Washington D.C.

Ai started her own company iAsk Media in 2014 as founder and host. In 2016, Ai joined SAIF Partners in 2016 as Venture Partner.

== Education ==
Ai graduated from the Harvard Kennedy School with a master's degree in Business and Government Policy, during which she served as the President of Media Group at Harvard Kennedy School. She previously obtained a master's degree in International Communications from Peking University, during which she served as the President of Nanyan Radio Station of Peking University Graduate School. Ai earned her BA degree from Communication University of China, during which she served as Chief Editor of University Newspaper of Communication University of China.

== Charity ==
Ai is committed to support children and youth for a better life. She co-hosts the first nationally broadcast weekly program that raises funds for China's poorest children who live in over 100,000 villages below poverty line. She hosts another top nationally broadcast reality show You're Hired! which helps tens of millions of new graduates get their jobs. She also founded the iAsk Red Charity. The charity hosted event in 2016 which gathered over 200 business leaders to support campaigns for a wide range of social NGOs, such as WABC for autistic children, SOS Children's Villages China for orphans and so on.

== Books ==
- How Not Letting Your Company Die For Startups (Chinese, ISBN 9787508677347) published by CITIC Press in 2017.
- Common Sense of Entrepreneurship (Chinese, ISBN 978-7-5086-5817-9 ) published by CITIC Press in 2016.
- Struggle is a Faith (Chinese, ISBN 978-7-5057-3464-7) published by China Friendship Press in 2015.

== Honours and awards ==
- 2016, Forbes 30 Under 30 Asia by Forbes.
- The Global Shapers by World Economic Forum.
- 2021, National Woman Pace-Setter.
