= Qiandaohu railway station =

Railway station in Hangzhou, Zhejiang

Qiandaohu 千岛湖
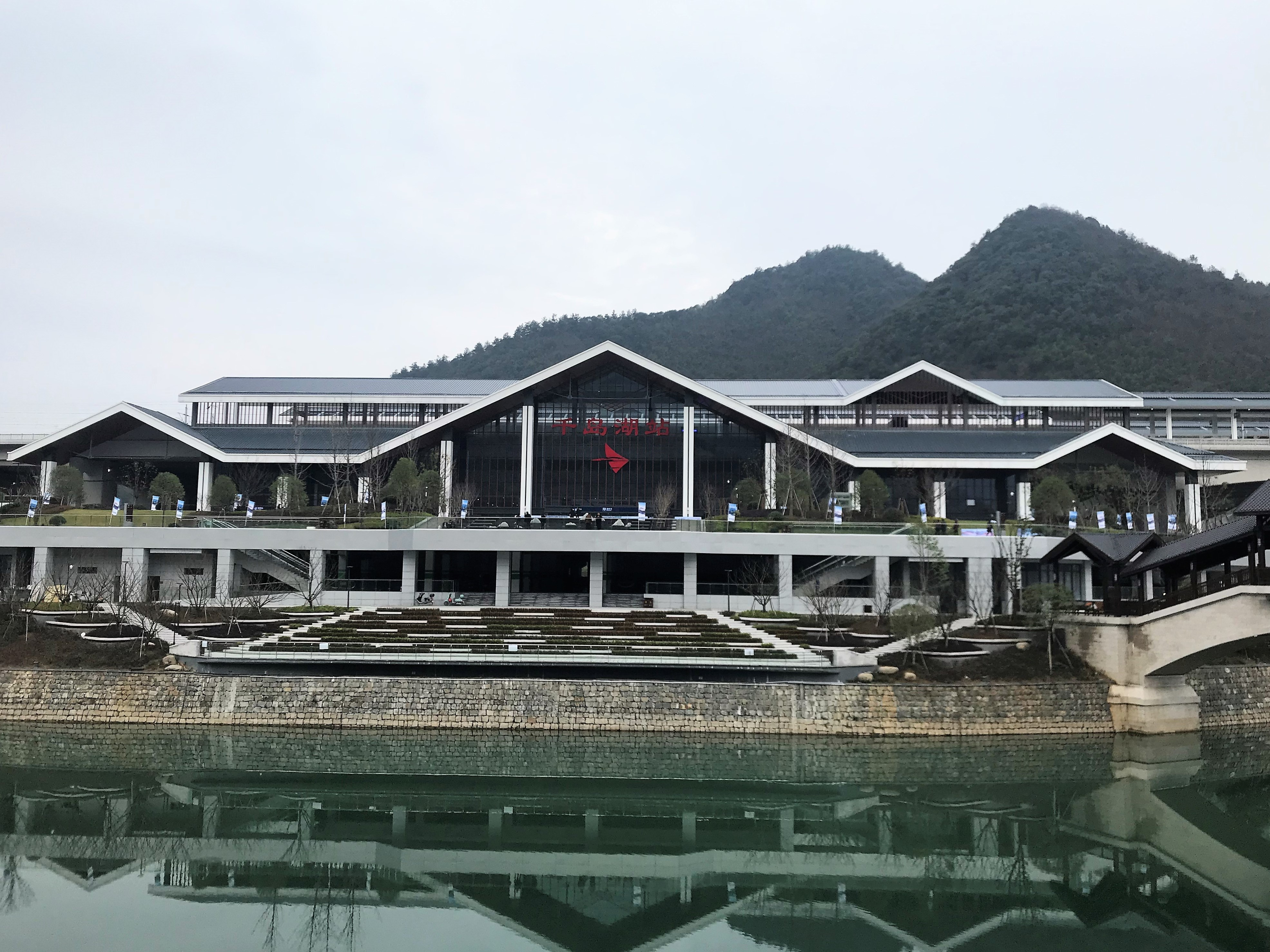
- Exterior of the station

General information
- Location: Chun'an County, Hangzhou, Zhejiang; China
- Coordinates: 29°44′17″N 119°11′14″E
- Line: Hangzhou–Huangshan intercity railway

History
- Opened: December 25, 2018
Location

Qiandaohu railway station (Chinese: 千岛湖站; lit. 'Qiandao Lake railway station') is a railway station in Chun'an County, Hangzhou, Zhejiang, China. It opened on 25 December 2018 along with the Hangzhou–Huangshan intercity railway. It is located directly adjacent to Qiandao Lake. During construction, the name of this station was Chun'an, however this was changed to Qiandaohu in July 2018.

Preceding station	China Railway High-speed	Following station
Jiande towards Hangzhou East	Hangzhou–Huangshan intercity railway	Sanyang towards Huangshan North
