= Taiwan Strait Tunnel Project =

Proposed road and rail tunnel

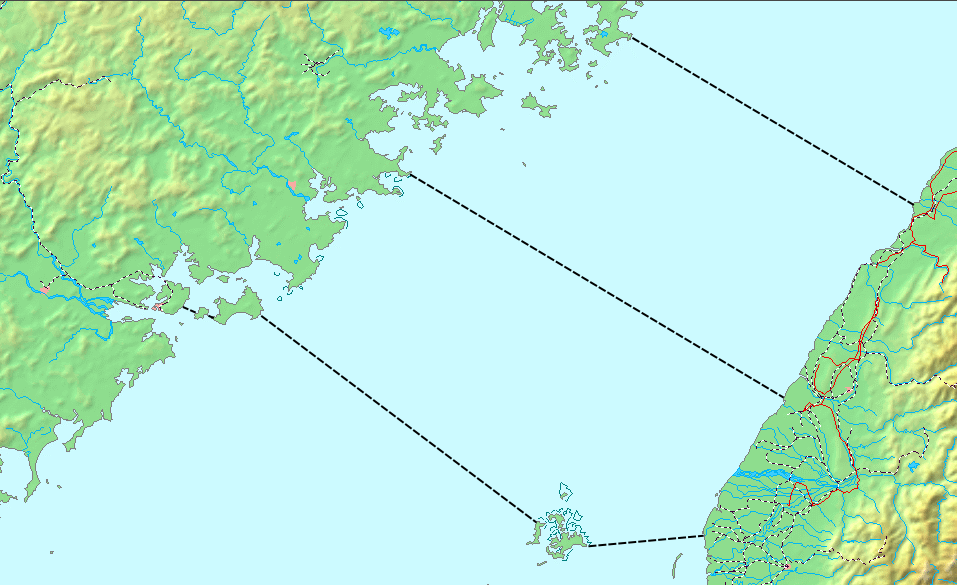
Taiwan Strait Tunnel Project

The Taiwan Strait Tunnel Project is a proposed undersea tunnel to connect Pingtan in Mainland China to Hsinchu in Taiwan as part of the G3 Beijing–Taipei Expressway. It has seen a few academic studies from the China side, but no interest from the Taiwan side, which views such proposals as propaganda. In addition to political factors, the project is generally not considered realistic due to technical and cost concerns.

== Proposals ==
First proposed in 1996, the project has since been subject to a number of academic discussions, including by the China Railway Engineering Society. The route between Pingtan and Hsinchu has been proposed because of its short distance and its relative geological stability (in a region frequented by earthquakes). In 2005, an academic from the Chinese Academy of Engineering stated that the project was one of five major undersea tunnel projects under consideration for the next twenty to thirty years.

== Reception in Taiwan ==
The project is not considered viable due to the staggering costs, unsolved technical problems, and foremost a lack of interest from the Taiwanese. At nearly 150 kilometres (93 mi) undersea, the proposed tunnel would be 6.4 times longer than the existing Seikan Tunnel (23.3 km or 14.5 mi), nearly 4 times longer than the Channel Tunnel (37.9 km or 23.5 mi) (the current longest underwater tunnel segment), and two-thirds longer than the proposed Bohai Strait tunnel project (which would be 90 kilometres (56 mi)). In addition, Taiwan is much concerned about the tunnel's potential use by China in military actions. Nonetheless, in July 2013, the Chinese State Council approved plans for the project.

As political relations between Taiwan and mainland China are contentious, the proposal has been mocked in Taiwan, along with the Beijing–Taipei high-speed rail corridor.

== See also ==
- Bohai Strait tunnel
- G3 Beijing–Taipei Expressway
- Beijing–Taipei High-Speed Rail Corridor
- G99 Taiwan Ring Expressway
- China National Highway 228 (Taiwan)
- Guangdong–Hainan railway
- Kinmen–Xiamen Bridge
