= Huangshan North railway station =

Railway station in Huangshan, China

Huangshan North 黄山北站
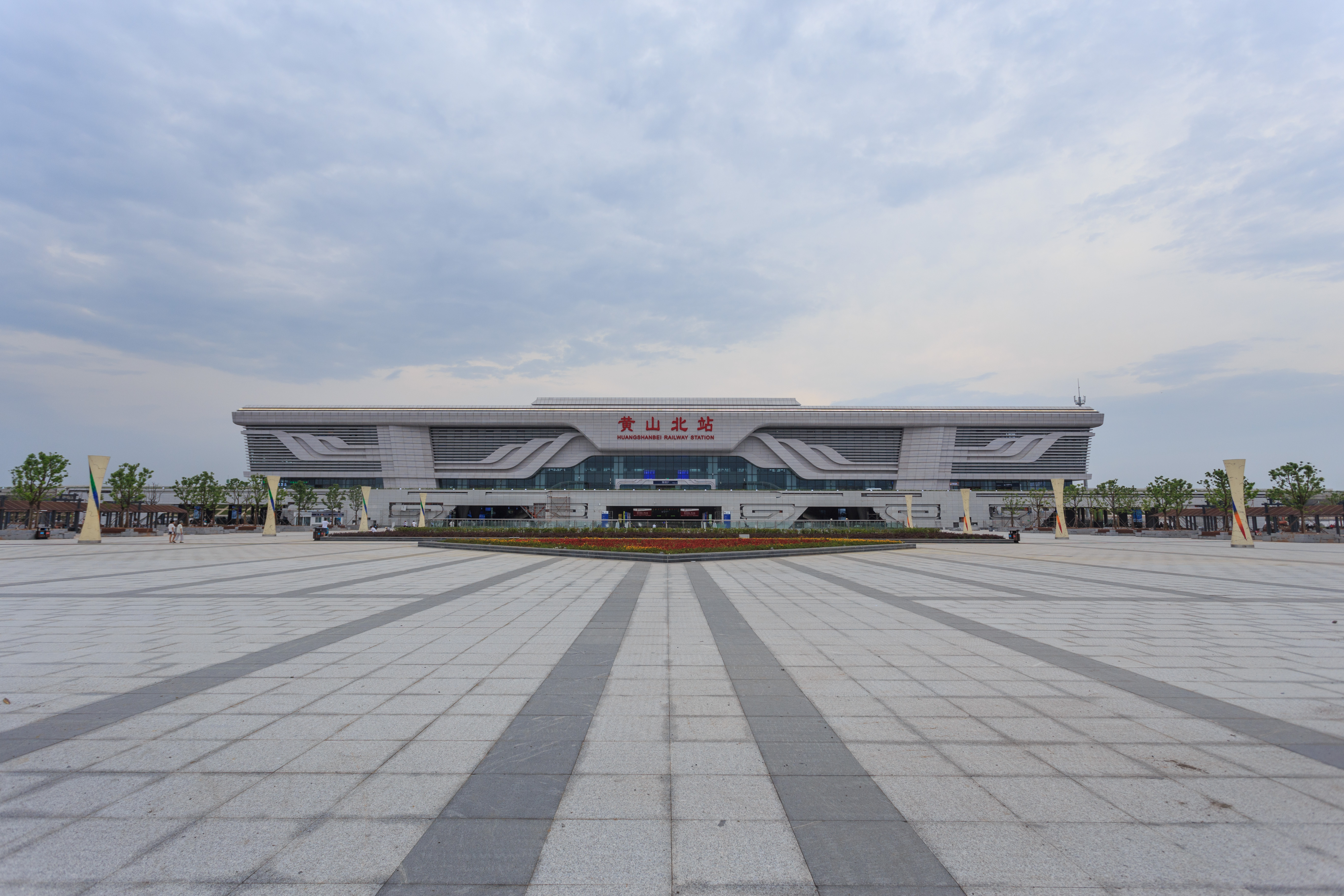

General information
- Other names: Huangshanbei
- Location: Xintan, Tunxi District, Huangshan, Anhui; China
- Coordinates: 29°49′07″N 118°16′02″E
- Operated by: China Railway
- Line(s): Hefei–Fuzhou HSR; Hangzhou–Nanchang HSR; Chizhou–Huangshan HSR
- Platforms: 7
- Tracks: 13

Other information
- Station code: TMIS code: 34130; Telegraph code: NYH; Pinyin code: HSB
- Classification: 2nd class station

History
- Opened: June 28, 2015

Huangshan North railway station (Chinese: 黄山北站; pinyin: Huángshān Běi Zhàn) is a railway station of Hefei–Fuzhou High-Speed Railway in Xintan, Tunxi District, Huangshan, Anhui and belongs to the China Railway Shanghai Group. It commenced services with the Hefei-Fuzhou HSR on June 28, 2015.

The station lies on the Hefei-Fuzhou HSR, part of the Beijing–Taipei high-speed rail corridor, the Hangzhou–Nanchang high-speed railway and is the terminus of the Chizhou–Huangshan high-speed railway. The station is the second largest high-speed railway station in Anhui Province.

== Rail services ==
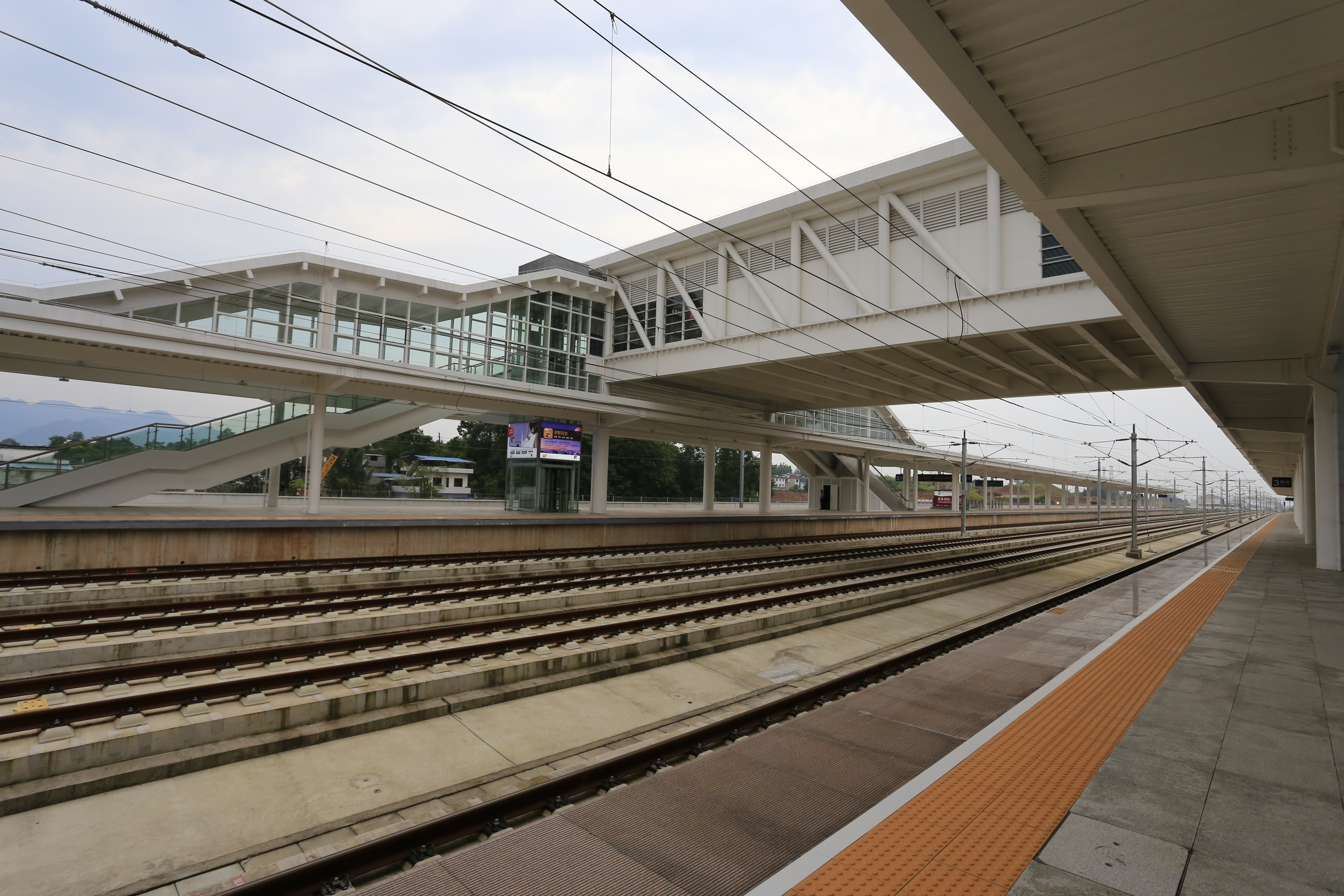
Platforms

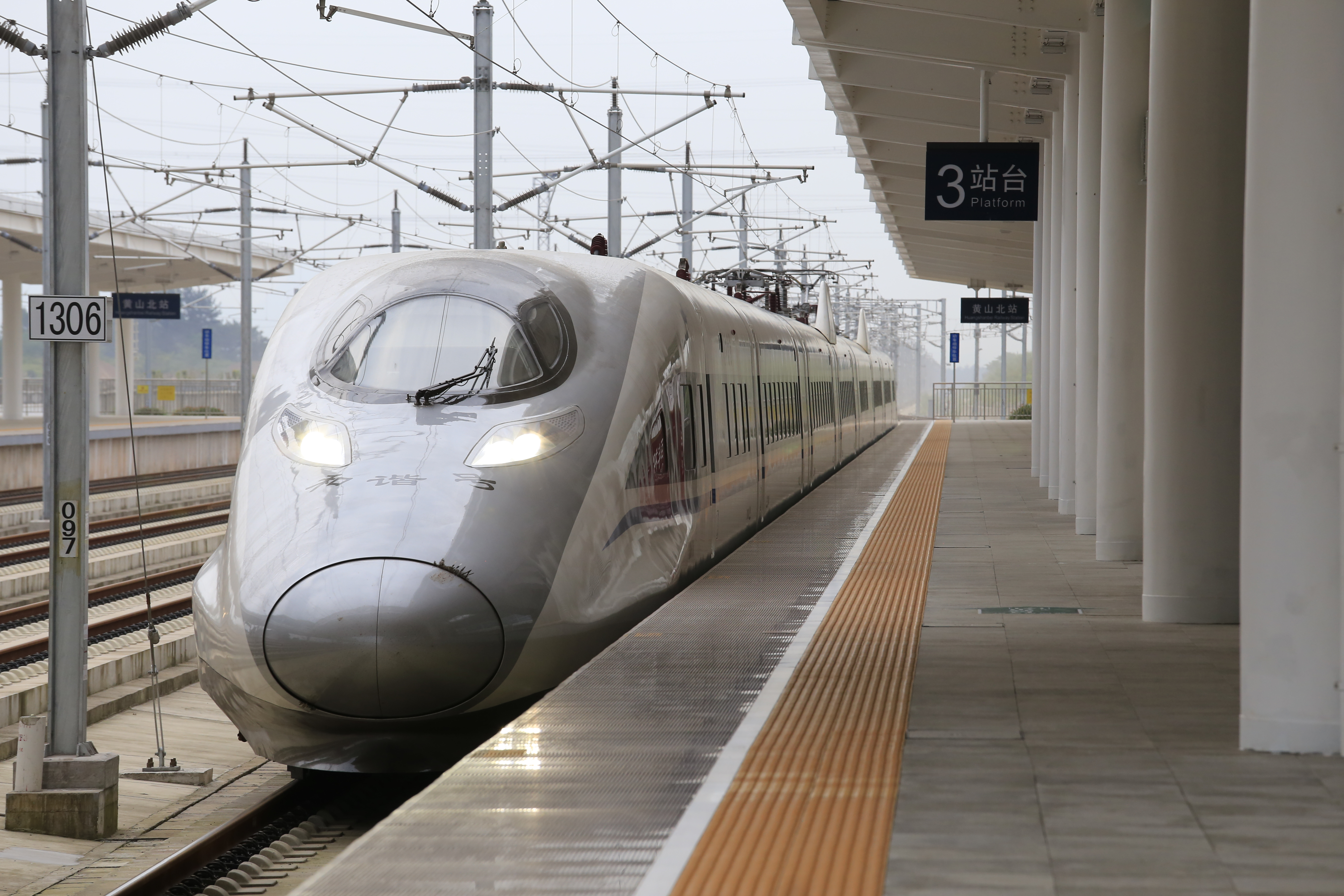
An EMU train heading to Fuzhou enters platform 3

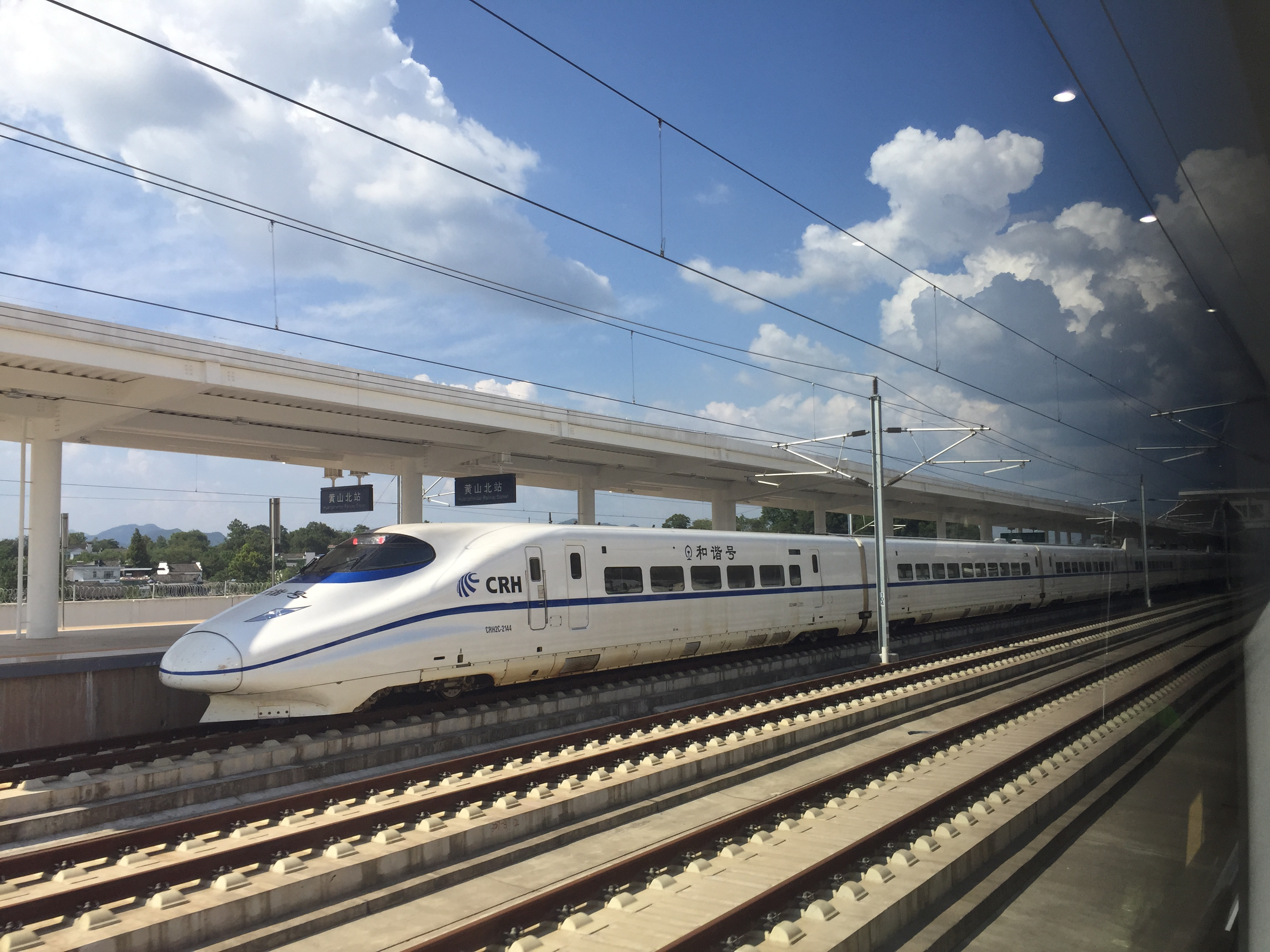
EMU train stops at platform 4

The station is currently served by services operated by the following China Railway groups：

Railway group	Destination
Beijing	Beijing South, Fuzhou, Tianjin West, Xiamen North
Guangzhou	Bengbu South, Guangzhou South, Hefei South
Jinan	Fuzhou, Jinan West, Qingdao, Xiamen North
Kunming	Hangzhou East
Nanchang	Beijing South, Fuzhou, Xiamen North
Shanghai	Beijing South, Bengbu South, Bozhou South, Cangnan, Changzhou North, Fuzhou, Hangzhou East, Hefei South, Nanchang West, Nanjing South, Sanming, Shanghai Hongqiao, Shenzhen North, Wenzhou South, Xiamen North, Xuzhou East
Wuhan	Hankou, Hangzhou East, Qiandaohu, Wuhan
Xi'an	Fuzhou, Hangzhou East, Xi'an North
Zhengzhou	Hangzhou East, Zhengzhou East

Preceding station	China Railway High-speed	Following station
Shexian North towards Hefei South	Hefei–Fuzhou high-speed railway	Wuyuan towards Fuzhou
Shexian North towards Hangzhou East	Hangzhou–Huangshan intercity railway	Terminus
