= Chizhou–Huangshan high-speed railway =

High-speed rail line in Anhui, China

Overview
- Termini: Chizhou; Yixian East (through service to Huangshan North)
- Stations: 4 (except through service)

Service
- Operator(s): China Railway Shanghai Group

History
- Opened: 26 April 2024

Technical
- Line length: 125.1 km (77.7 mi)
- Track gauge: 1,435 mm (4 ft 8 1/2 in)
- Operating speed: 350 km/h (220 mph)

The Chizhou–Huangshan high-speed railway is a high-speed railway line in Anhui, China. It is 125.1 kilometres (77.7 mi) long and has a maximum speed of 350 kilometres per hour (220 mph). The railway opened on 26 April 2024.

== Stations ==
- Chizhou (池州)
- Jiuhuashan (九华山)
- Huangshan West (黄山西)
- Yixian East (黟县东)
- through service to Huangshan North (黄山北) via the Hangzhou–Nanchang high-speed railway
