= Xuanzhou, Xuancheng =

Xuanzhou 宣州区
- District
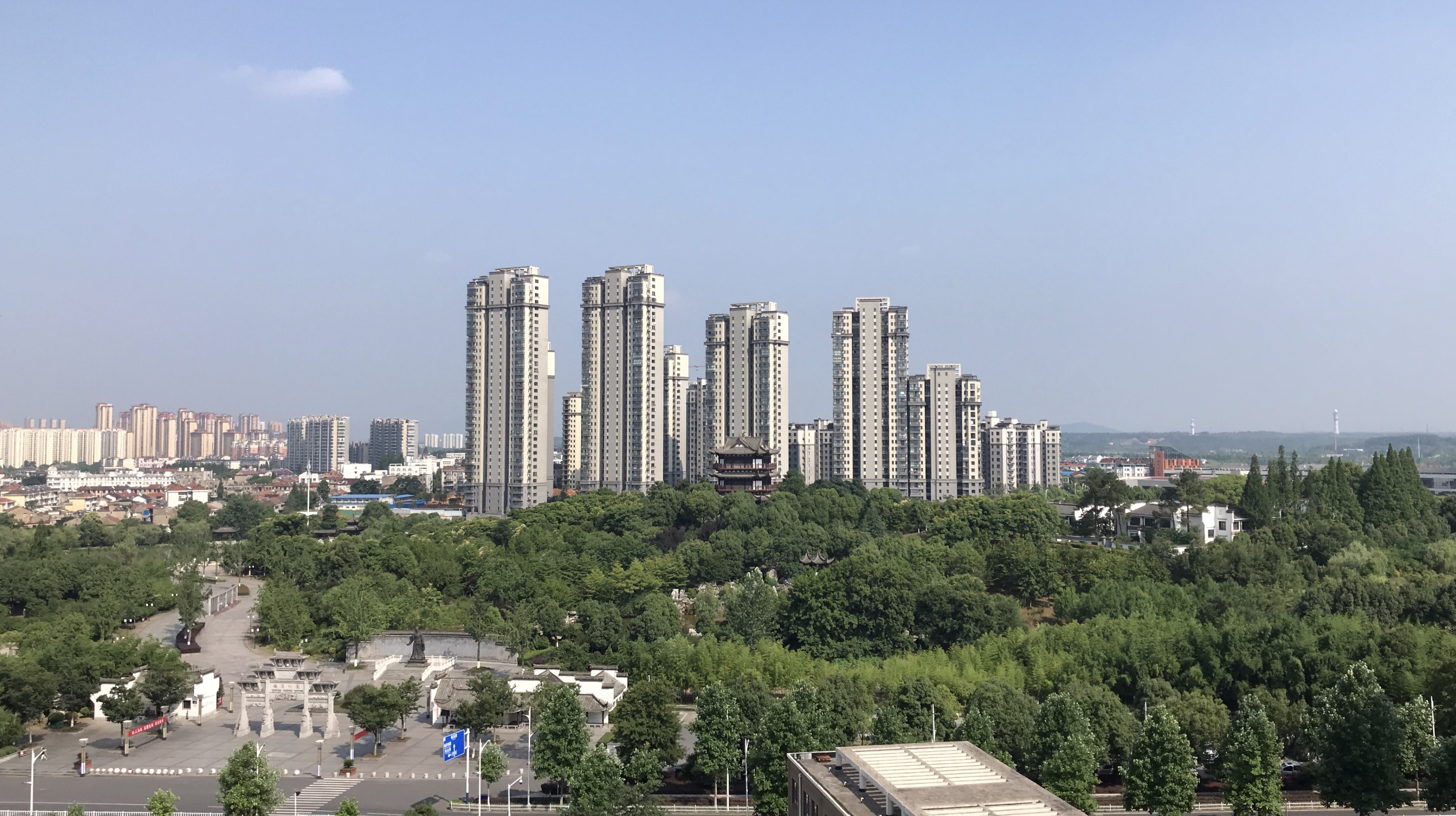
- Downtown Xuanzhou
- Interactive map of Xuanzhou
- Coordinates: 30°56′46″N 118°45′22″E
- Country: People's Republic of China
- Province: Anhui
- Prefecture-level city: Xuancheng

Area
  - Total: 2,585 km^{2} (998 sq mi)

Population (2018)
  - Total: 864,000
  - Density: 334/km^{2} (866/sq mi)
- Time zone: UTC+8 (China Standard)
- Postal code: 242074

Xuanzhou District (simplified Chinese: 宣州区; traditional Chinese: 宣州區; pinyin: Xuānzhōu Qū) is an urban district of the city of Xuancheng, Anhui Province, People's Republic of China. It has a population of 840,000 and an area of 2,533 km^{2} (978 sq mi).

Xuanzhou District has jurisdiction over five subdistricts, sixteen towns and eighteen townships.

== Administrative divisions ==
Xuanzhou District is divided to 7 subdistricts, 14 towns and 5 townships.

Subdistricts

- Shuangqiao Subdistrict (双桥街道)
- Jichuan Subdistrict (济川街道)
- Chengjiang Subdistrict (澄江街道)
- Aofeng Subdistrict (鳌峰街道)
- Xilin Subdistrict (西林街道)
- Jingtingshan Subdistrict (敬亭山街道)
- Feicai Subdistrict (飞彩街道)

Towns

- Shuiyang (水阳镇)
- Liqiao (狸桥镇)
- Shencun (沈村镇)
- Guquan (古泉镇)
- Honglin (洪林镇)
- Hanting (寒亭镇)
- Wenchang (文昌镇)
- Xikou (溪口镇)
- Zhouwang (周王镇)
- Xintian (新田镇)
- Yangliu (杨柳镇)
- Shuidong (水东镇)
- Xiangyang (向阳镇)
- Sunbu (孙埠镇)

Townships

- Zhuqiao Township (朱桥乡)
- Yangxian Township (养贤乡)
- Wuxing Township (五星乡)
- Jinba Township (金坝乡)
- Huangdu Township (黄渡乡)

== Transport ==
- China National Highway 318
- Xuancheng railway station
