= Jixi County =

Jixi 绩溪县
- County
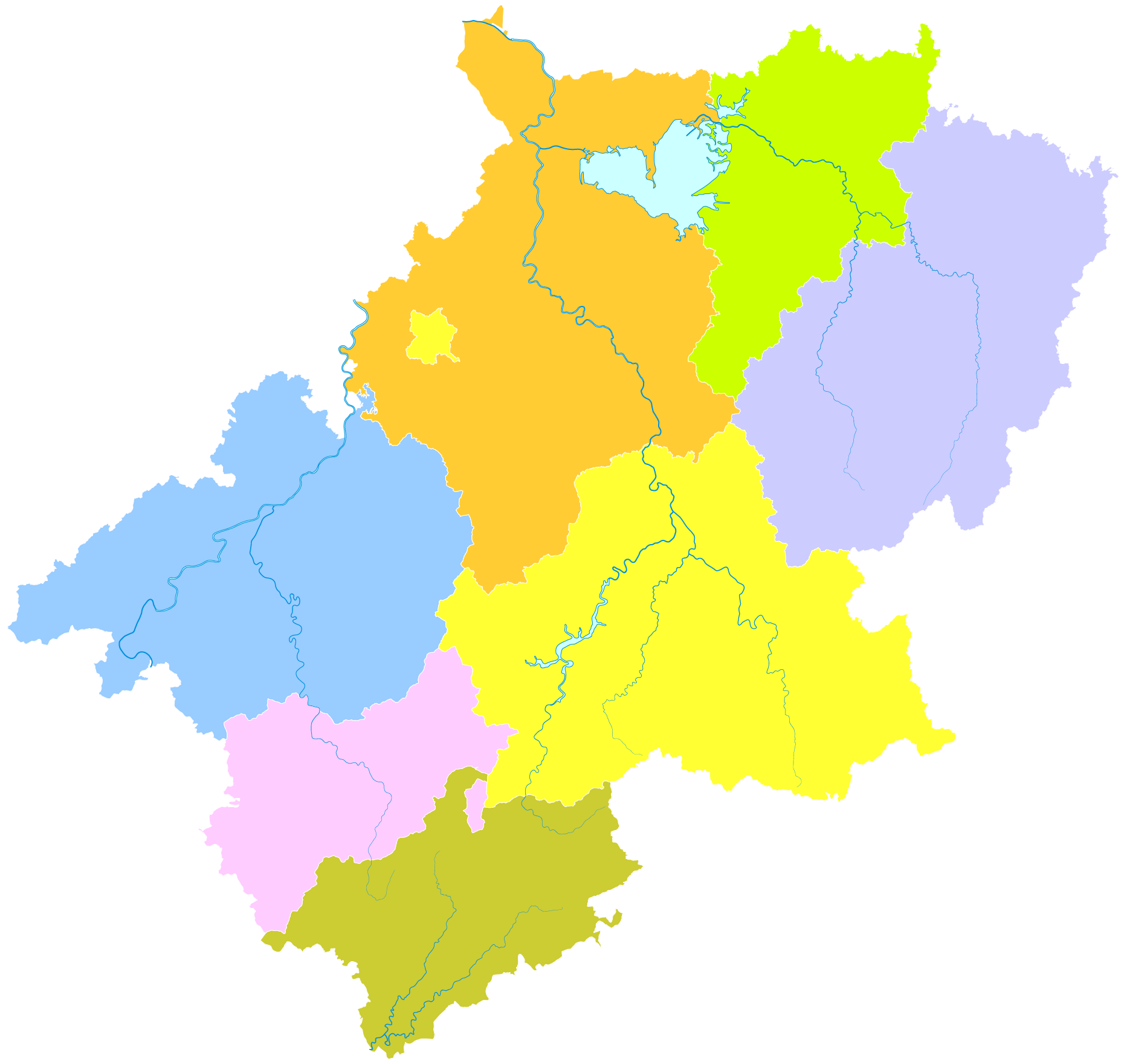
- Jixi is the southernmost division in this map of Xuancheng

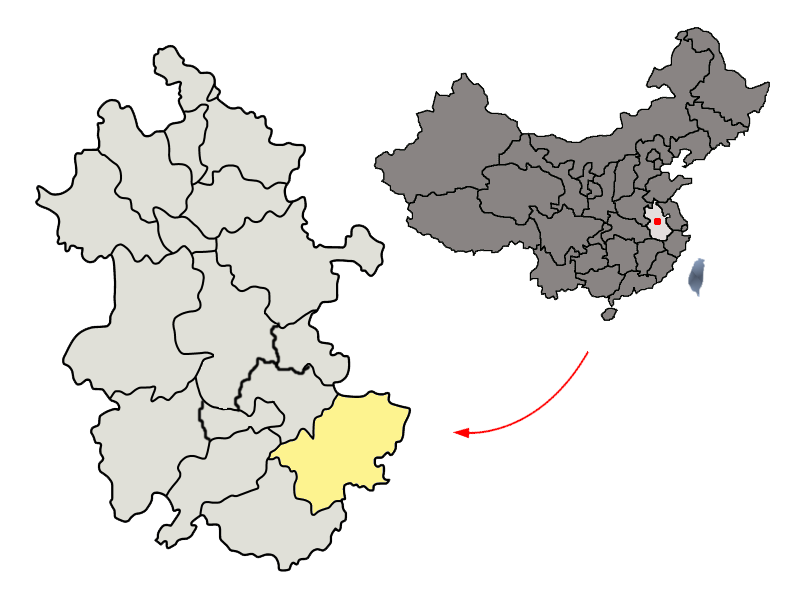
- Xuancheng in Anhui
- Coordinates: 30°04′03″N 118°34′43″E
- Country: People's Republic of China
- Province: Anhui
- Prefecture-level city: Xuancheng

Area
  - Total: 1,126 km^{2} (435 sq mi)

Population (2019)
  - Total: 159,000
  - Density: 141/km^{2} (366/sq mi)
- Time zone: UTC+8 (China Standard)
- Postal code: 245300

Jixi County
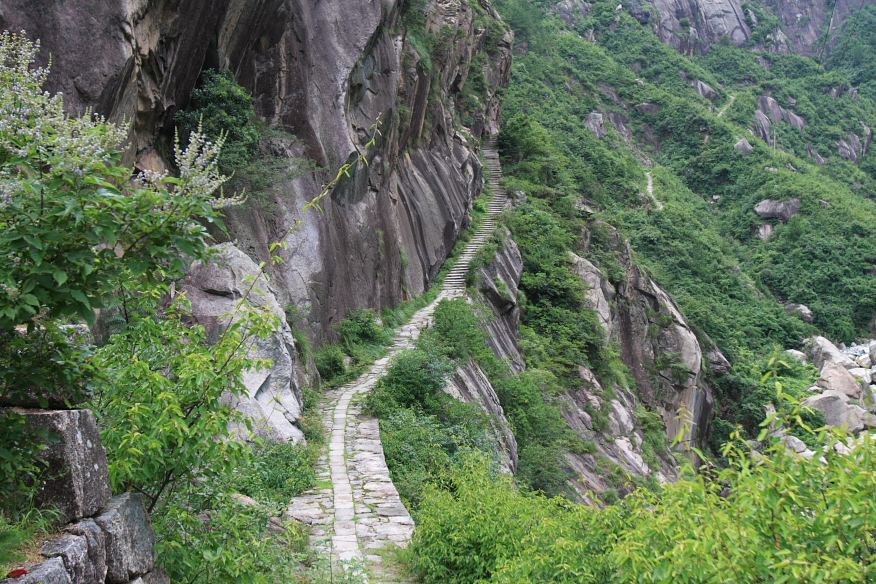
- The Huihang Trail, connecting Jixi with Lin'an in Zhejiang
- Simplified Chinese: 绩溪县
- Traditional Chinese: 績溪縣
Transcriptions
Standard Mandarin
- Hanyu Pinyin: Jìxī Xiàn
- Wade–Giles: Chi-hsi Hsien

Jixi County (Chinese: 绩溪县, Mandarin pronunciation: [tɕî.ɕí.ɕjɛ̂n]; Jixihua pronunciation: [tɕiɛʔ.t͡sʰɿ.ɕĩ] jie' cii xin) is a county under the administration of the prefecture-level city of Xuancheng, in the southeast of Anhui province, China, bordering Zhejiang province to the east. It has a population of 180,000 and an area of 1,126 km^{2} (435 sq mi). Jixi County is a hilly region with many rivers and bodies of water.

== History ==
Huayang Town, under the administration of Jixi County, was well known during the Han dynasty (208 BCE–220 CE). Jixi County was formally established in 776 CE during the Tang dynasty. It formed part of the Huizhou region. In early European accounts, it was romanized Tsiki.

== Administration ==
Jixi County has jurisdiction over eight towns and three townships.

Towns

- Huayang (华阳镇)
- Chang'an (长安镇)
- Fuling (伏岭镇)
- Jinsha (金沙镇)
- Shangzhuang (上庄镇)
- Yangxi (扬溪镇)
- Linxi (临溪镇)
- Yingzhou (瀛洲镇)

Townships

- Jiapeng Township (家朋乡)
- Jingzhou Township (荆州乡)
- Banqiaotou Township (板桥头乡)

== Climate ==
Climate data for Jixi, elevation 191 m (627 ft), (1991–2020 normals, extremes 1991–present)
| Month | Jan | Feb | Mar | Apr | May | Jun | Jul | Aug | Sep | Oct | Nov | Dec | Year |
|---|---|---|---|---|---|---|---|---|---|---|---|---|---|
| Record high °C (°F) | 23.9 (75.0) | 27.3 (81.1) | 33.1 (91.6) | 33.2 (91.8) | 36.2 (97.2) | 37.4 (99.3) | 40.6 (105.1) | 41.2 (106.2) | 39.2 (102.6) | 35.4 (95.7) | 31.4 (88.5) | 23.3 (73.9) | 41.2 (106.2) |
| Mean daily maximum °C (°F) | 9.5 (49.1) | 12.3 (54.1) | 16.6 (61.9) | 22.7 (72.9) | 27.2 (81.0) | 29.4 (84.9) | 33.3 (91.9) | 33.2 (91.8) | 29.4 (84.9) | 24.4 (75.9) | 18.4 (65.1) | 12.0 (53.6) | 22.4 (72.3) |
| Daily mean °C (°F) | 4.2 (39.6) | 6.6 (43.9) | 10.6 (51.1) | 16.4 (61.5) | 21.2 (70.2) | 24.3 (75.7) | 27.7 (81.9) | 27.3 (81.1) | 23.6 (74.5) | 18.1 (64.6) | 12.0 (53.6) | 6.0 (42.8) | 16.5 (61.7) |
| Mean daily minimum °C (°F) | 0.7 (33.3) | 2.7 (36.9) | 6.3 (43.3) | 11.6 (52.9) | 16.5 (61.7) | 20.6 (69.1) | 23.5 (74.3) | 23.4 (74.1) | 19.5 (67.1) | 13.6 (56.5) | 7.6 (45.7) | 2.0 (35.6) | 12.3 (54.2) |
| Record low °C (°F) | −13.2 (8.2) | −8.5 (16.7) | −6.1 (21.0) | 0.3 (32.5) | 7.2 (45.0) | 13.7 (56.7) | 16.3 (61.3) | 15.5 (59.9) | 9.5 (49.1) | 2.5 (36.5) | −5.2 (22.6) | −13.6 (7.5) | −13.6 (7.5) |
| Average precipitation mm (inches) | 74.2 (2.92) | 89.6 (3.53) | 149.7 (5.89) | 162.0 (6.38) | 188.0 (7.40) | 348.2 (13.71) | 207.5 (8.17) | 126.4 (4.98) | 73.6 (2.90) | 52.6 (2.07) | 61.7 (2.43) | 49.1 (1.93) | 1,582.6 (62.31) |
| Average precipitation days (≥ 0.1 mm) | 13.0 | 12.3 | 15.9 | 14.3 | 14.3 | 16.2 | 12.9 | 13.4 | 8.8 | 7.8 | 9.6 | 9.4 | 147.9 |
| Average snowy days | 4.4 | 2.6 | 0.8 | 0 | 0 | 0 | 0 | 0 | 0 | 0 | 0.2 | 1.7 | 9.7 |
| Average relative humidity (%) | 75 | 74 | 75 | 74 | 76 | 81 | 78 | 78 | 76 | 73 | 75 | 73 | 76 |
| Mean monthly sunshine hours | 106.6 | 104.6 | 119.1 | 137.6 | 159.0 | 123.1 | 191.3 | 188.7 | 164.0 | 165.2 | 137.8 | 127.5 | 1,724.5 |
| Percentage possible sunshine | 33 | 33 | 32 | 35 | 38 | 29 | 45 | 47 | 45 | 47 | 43 | 40 | 39 |
Source: China Meteorological Administration

== Transportation ==
=== Rail ===
Jixi is served by the Anhui–Jiangxi Railway and Jixi North railway station on the Hefei–Fuzhou high-speed railway and the Hangzhou–Huangshan intercity railway.

== Residents ==
Famous people from Jixi County include:

- Hu Zongxian, the Ming dynasty Minister of War and general who presided the government's to reaction to pirates
- Hu Xueyan, businessman of the Qing dynasty
- Hu Shih, scholar and official of Republic of China era who piloted the New Culture Movement
- Hu Jintao, General Secretary of the ruling Chinese Communist Party and president of China from 2002 to 2012
