= Beijing–Fuzhou high-speed railway =

Surface transportation path

Beijing–Taipei High-Speed Rail Corridor (Mainland section)

The Beijing–Fuzhou high-speed railway (simplified Chinese: 京福高速铁路; traditional Chinese: 京福高速鐵路; pinyin: Jīngfú Gāosù Tiělù) is a completed high-speed rail corridor, intended to connect Beijing and Fuzhou.

== Route ==
The line shares tracks with the following railway lines:

- Beijing–Shanghai high-speed railway between Beijing and Bengbu
- Hefei–Bengbu high-speed railway between Bengbu and Hefei
- Hefei–Fuzhou high-speed railway between Hefei and Fuzhou
- Fuzhou–Pingtan railway, between Fuzhou and Pingtan

=== Potential Expansion ===
Pending a cross-straight political arrangement, it is proposed by the Chinese government that a future extension would cross an undersea tunnel which would connect Pingtan and Hsinchu. It would share tracks with the Taiwan High Speed Rail from Hsinchu to Taipei.

Current project planning is unilateral, undertaken without the participation of Taiwan, which the People's Republic of China claims, but has never controlled. The Pingtan–Taipei portion of the railway headed to Taiwan is referred as "possible long-term future expansions" in construction documents of Fuzhou–Pingtan section.

== Parallel corridors ==
The Chinese government has planned the Beijing–Hong Kong (Taipei) corridor as a parallel railway corridor. The corridor will pass through the cities of Hengshui, Shangqiu, Hefei and Fuzhou.

== Reception ==
The plan has been both mocked and welcomed by different parties in Taiwan.

== See also ==
- Taiwan Strait Tunnel Project
