= Hefei–Fuzhou high-speed railway =

Railway line in China

Overview
- Native name: 合福高速铁路
- Status: Operational
- Owner: China Railway
- Locale: Anhui province; Jiangxi province; Fujian province
- Termini: Hefei South; Fuzhou
- Stations: 25

Service
- Type: High-speed rail
- System: China Railway High-speed
- Services: 1
- Operators: CR Shanghai; CR Nanchang

History
- Opened: 28 June 2015

Technical
- Line length: 813 km (505 mi)
- Number of tracks: 2 (Double-track)
- Track gauge: 1,435 mm (4 ft 8 1/2 in) standard gauge
- Electrification: 25 kV 50 Hz AC (Overhead line)
- Operating speed: 350 km/h (220 mph)
- Maximum incline: 2%

Hefei–Fuzhou high-speed railway (simplified Chinese: 合福高速铁路; traditional Chinese: 合福高速鐵路; pinyin: Héfú Gāosù Tiělù), is a dual-track, electrified, passenger-dedicated, high-speed rail line between Hefei and Fuzhou, the provincial capitals of Anhui and Fujian, respectively. It has a total length of 813 km (505 mi) and runs through Anhui, Jiangxi and Fujian province. Construction began on 27 April 2010 and the line was opened on 28 June 2015. The total cost of the line was about ¥109.8 billion. On this line, trains can reach top speeds of 300 kilometres per hour (186 mph), reducing the travel time by rail from Hefei to Fuzhou from fourteen to four hours. The railway is part of the future Beijing–Taipei high-speed rail corridor.

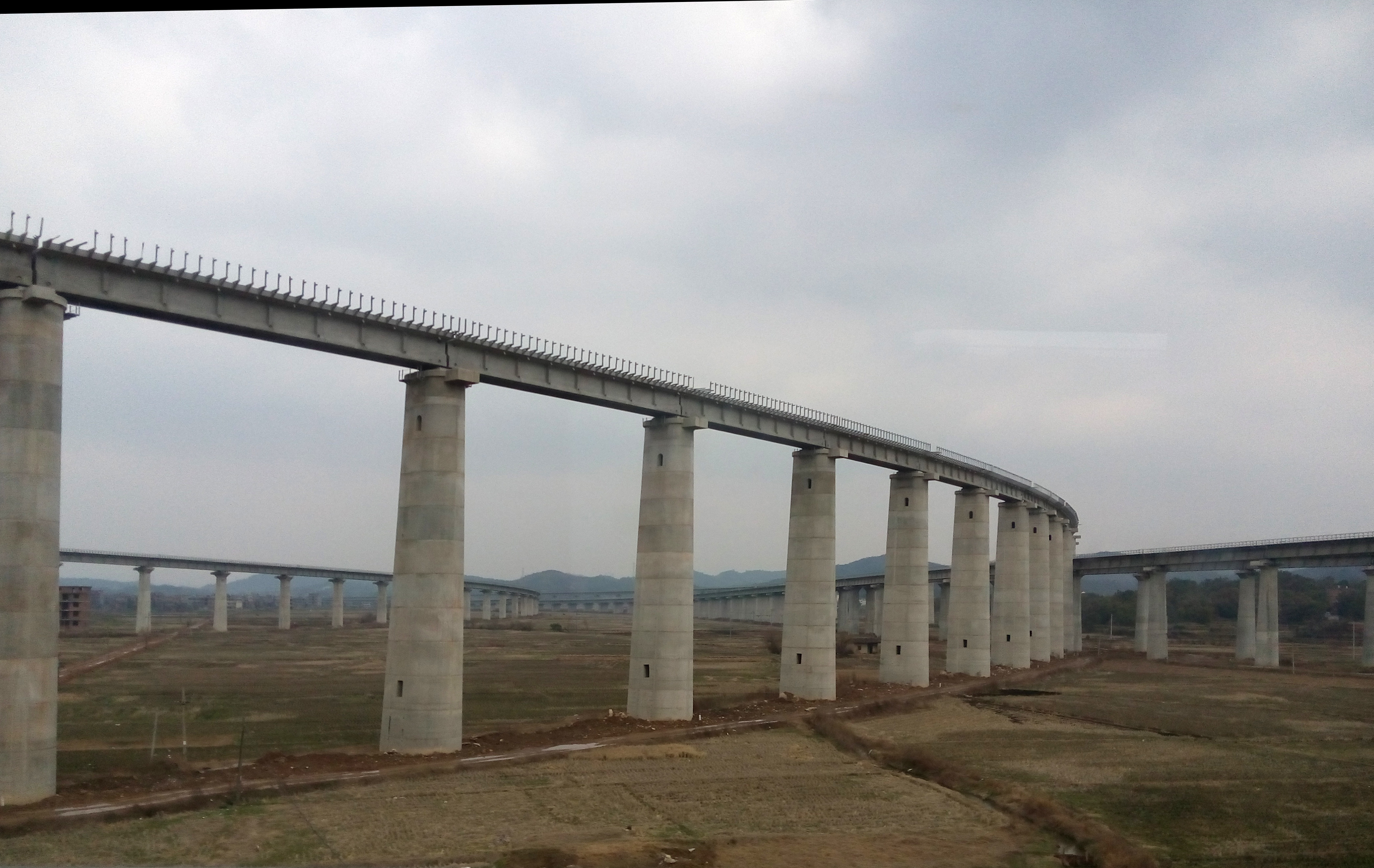
The intersection of the Hefei–Fuzhou and Shanghai–Kunming high-speed railways in Shangrao in February 2014

Cities and towns along the route include Changlinhe, Chaohu, Wuwei, Tongling, Nanling, Jingxian, Jingde, Jixi and Huangshan in Anhui, Wuyuan and Shangrao in Jiangxi, and Wuyishan, Jian'ou, Gutian, Nanping and Minqing in Fujian.

The Hefu passenger-dedicated line (PDL) constitutes a portion of the proposed Beijing–Taipei high-speed rail corridor, which would tunnel under the Taiwan Strait from Fuzhou to the island of Taiwan. The northern section of this project is being built as the section of the Beijing-Shanghai HSR from Beijing to Bengbu. From Bengbu, a high-speed rail spur (opened on 16 October 2012), extends to Hefei, supporting 4 hour travel time from Beijing South railway station to Hefei. The Hefu PDL would then extend the line from Hefei to Fuzhou on the western shores of the Taiwan Strait. Political differences between the People's Republic of China (which controls mainland China) and the Republic of China (which controls Taiwan) complicate plans to extend the line by tunnel to Taipei; these plans were nonetheless drawn up unilaterally by the PRC, without ROC participation.

== Route ==
The Hefu PDL connects the Central Plain and the southeastern coast of China. It is one of several projects that the Chinese government has undertaken to develop rail infrastructure along the western shores of the Taiwan Strait. Most of the line runs through mountainous regions, including scenic areas of Huangshan and Wuyi Mountains, both UNESCO World Heritage Sites. Of the 339.4 km (210.9 mi) of tracks in Anhui, 81.6% will be laid on bridges and in tunnels. The longest of the line's 170 bridges and 54 tunnels will be the Tongling Yangtze River Railroad Bridge at 52.05 km (32.34 mi).

== History ==
- 29 July 2009: The Hefei–Fuzhou railway project is approved by the State Development and Planning Commission.
- 22 December 2009: Project announced by the Ministry of Railway in Zhengzhou.
- 27 April 2010: Construction began on the Hefu PDL.
- 28 June 2015: Line opened.
