= Bright (surname) =

Bright is a surname. Notable people with the surname include:

- A. D. Bright (1838–1898), Justice of the Tennessee Supreme Court
- Adam Bright (born 1984), Australian pitcher
- Alfred L. Bright (1940–2019), American artist
- Anna Bright (born 1999), American professional pickleball player
- Annie Bright (1840–1913), Australian journalist and spiritualist
- Bill Bright (1921–2003), American evangelist
- Bobby Bright (born 1952), U.S. congressman and mayor of Montgomery, Alabama
- Charles Bright (judge) (1912–1983), Australian judge
- Chris Bright (born 1970), Canadian ice hockey player
- Crystal Bright (born 1981), American musician and artist
- Dave Bright (born 1949), New Zealand footballer
- Dora Bright (1862–1951), British composer and pianist
- Gift Bright (born 2010), Nigerian sprinter
- Graham Bright (born 1942), British Conservative politician
- Greg Bright (born 1957), American football player
- H. R. Bum Bright (1920–2004), American businessman and owner of the Dallas Cowboys
- Heather Bright (born 1982), American singer
- Henry Bright (1810/14–1873), English artist
- Henry Edward Bright (1819–1904) South Australian politician
- Jacob Bright (1821–1899), English politician
- James Franck Bright (1832–1920), English historian
- Jason Bright (born 1973), Australian racing driver
- Jerry Bright (born 1947), American sprinter
- Jesse D. Bright (1812–1875), U.S. Senator removed from office during the American Civil War
- John Bright (1811–1889), British Liberal politician
- Kenta Bright (born 1999), Japanese baseball player
- Kevin S. Bright (born 1954), American television executive producer
- Kris Bright (born 1986), New Zealand footballer
- Leon Bright (born 1955), American football player Tampabay and New York Giants
- Maija Bright (born 1942), more commonly known as Maija Peeples-Bright, Latvian-born American and Canadian artist
- Martin Bright (born 1966), British journalist
- Mary Bright (1954–2002), Scottish curtain designer
- Michelle Bright (died 1999), Australian murder victim
- Millie Bright (born 1993), English association football player
- Mike Bright (volleyball) (1937–2017), American volleyball player
- Myron H. Bright (1919–2016), American judge
- Nick Bright, British radio DJ
- Octavia Bright (born 1986), English writer and broadcaster
- Richard Bright (actor) (1937–2006), American actor
- Richard Bright (physician) (1789–1858), English physician and kidney disease research pioneer
- Rick Bright, American immunologist and whistleblower
- Robert Bright (1902–1988), American author and illustrator of children's literature
- Robert Onesiphorus Bright (1823–1896), British general
- Ronnie Bright (1938–2015), American singer
- Rowena Bright (born 1980), Australian alpine skier
- Scott Bright, American politician from Colorado
- Simon Bright, art and set decorator, The Lord of the Rings (film series)
- Stephen Bright (born 1948), American lawyer
- Susie Bright (born 1958), American sexuality writer
- Tarryn Bright (born 1983), South African field hockey player
- Terry Bright (born 1958), Australian footballer
- Thomas Lockyer Bright (1818–1874), Australian journalist
- Tom Bright, Ugandan politician
- Torah Bright (born 1986), Australian snowboarder
- Trace Bright (born 2000), American baseball player
- Victor Bright, American electrical engineer
- William Bright (disambiguation)

== See also ==
- Bright (given name)
