= Guangming =

Guāngmíng (Chinese: 光明; Wade–Giles: Kuang-ming; lit. 'bright(ness)') may refer to:

== Newspapers ==
- Guangming Daily, national newspaper in China
- Guang Ming Daily (Malaysia), Chinese-language newspaper based in Malaysia

== Locations ==
- Guangming District, Shenzhen, Guangdong
  - Guangming Line, Shenzhen Metro
- Guangming Peak, Huangshan, Anhui
- Guangming Road station, Shanghai Metro in Kunshan, Jiangsu

Subdistricts

- Guangming Subdistrict, Hefei, in Luyang District, Hefei, Anhui
- Guangming Subdistrict, Beijing, in Shunyi District, Beijing
- Guangming Subdistrict, Shenzhen, in Bao'an District, Shenzhen, Guangdong
- Guangming Subdistrict, Tangshan, in Lubei District, Tangshan, Hebei
- Guangming Subdistrict, Hegang, in Xiangyang District, Hegang, Heilongjiang
- Guangming Subdistrict, Jiagedaqi District, in Jiagedaqi District, Daxing'anling Prefecture, Heilongjiang
- Guangming Subdistrict, Helong, in Helong, Jilin
- Guangming Subdistrict, Hunchun, in Hunchun, Jilin
- Guangming Subdistrict, Meihekou, in Meihekou, Jilin
- Guangming Subdistrict, Taonan, in Taonan, Jilin
- Guangming Subdistrict, Tonghua, in Dongchang District, Tonghua, Jilin
- Guangming Subdistrict, Chaoyang, Liaoning, in Shuangta District, Chaoyang, Liaoning
- Guangming Subdistrict, Dalian, in Jinzhou District, Dalian, Liaoning
- Guangming Subdistrict, Fushun, in Wanghua District, Fushun, Liaoning
- Guangming Road Subdistrict, Handan, in Hanshan District, Handan, Hebei
- Guangming Road Subdistrict, Pingdingshan, in Xinhua District, Pingdingshan, Henan
- Guangming Road Subdistrict, Hohhot, in Huimin District, Hohhot, Inner Mongolia
- Guangming Road Subdistrict, Zaozhuang, in Shizhong District, Zaozhuang, Shandong
- Guangming Road Subdistrict, Artux, in Artux, Xinjiang

== Historical eras ==
- Guangming (880–881), era name of Emperor Xizong of Tang
- Guangming (986–988?), era name of Duan Suying

== Other ==
- Guang Ming Temple, a Buddhist temple in Orlando, Florida, USA
- Kōmyō-ji (disambiguation), Buddhist temples, mostly in Japan; Kōmyō namely Guangming in Japanese.

== See also ==
- Bright (disambiguation)
- Brightness (disambiguation)
