= Bright =

Bright may refer to:

== Common meanings ==
- Bright, an adjective meaning giving off or reflecting illumination; see Brightness
- Bright, an adjective meaning someone with intelligence

== People ==
- Bright (surname)
- Bright (given name)
- Bright Vachirawit, stage name of Thai actor, musician, model, host and entrepreneur Vachirawit Chivaaree (born 1997)

== Places ==
=== Australia ===
- Bright, Victoria, a town
- Electoral district of Bright in South Australia

=== Canada ===
- Bright Parish, New Brunswick

=== Northern Ireland ===
- Bright, County Down, a village and parish in County Down

=== United States ===
- Bright, Indiana, a census-designated place
- Bright, West Virginia, an unincorporated community
- Bright, Wisconsin, an unincorporated community

== Arts and entertainment ==
=== Music ===
- Bright (American band), an experimental pop group from Brooklyn, New York
  - Bright (Bright (American band) album), 1996 album
- Bright (Japanese band), a dance vocal band from Japan
  - Bright (Bright (Japanese band) album), 2012 album
- "Bright" (song), a song by Echosmith

=== Other arts and entertainment ===
- Bright (film), a 2017 fantasy film starring Will Smith
- Bright Noa, a fictional character from the Gundam media franchise
- Bright (novel), a 2022 novel by Jessica Jung

== Businesses ==
- Bright (company), a platform distributing digital art
- Bright.com, an online job matching tool acquired by LinkedIn
- Bright Automotive, American manufacturer of electric vehicles
- More Radio Mid-Sussex, formerly Bright FM, a local radio station in Sussex, UK

== Other uses ==
- SS Bright, a cargo ship

== See also ==
- Bright's disease, historical classification of kidney diseases
- Brights movement, encouraging rejection of the supernatural
- Brite (disambiguation)
- Brightness (disambiguation)
