= Brite =

Brite or BRITE may refer to:

== People ==
- James Brite (1864–1942), American architect
- John and Coke Brite, convicted of three murders in Horse Creek, California, in 1936
- Leigh A. Brite, president of Eldorado Electrodata (1969–1976), an American electronics company
- Poppy Z. Brite (born 1967), American author
- Brite Andoh (born 1999), Ghanaian footballer

== BRITE ==
- BRITE, an ongoing space mission
- BRITE, a KEGG biological database
- Biomanufacturing Research Institute and Technology Enterprise, North Carolina Central University

== Other uses ==
- Brite Divinity School, at Texas Christian University in Fort Worth, Texas
- Brite Semiconductor, a Chinese semiconductor design and sales company
- Brite Music, Inc., a music publisher co-founded by Janeen Brady
- Brite Ranch, Presidio County, Texas, site of the 1917 Brite Ranch raid by Mexican bandits
- Rainbow Brite, a fictional character and American media franchise
- Brite, a main character in Silvia Prieto, a 1999 Argentine film

== See also ==
- Bright (disambiguation)
