= Tiefland =

Tiefland may refer to:

- Tiefland (opera) a 1903 opera by Eugen d'Albert
- Tiefland (film), a 1954 film by Leni Riefenstahl
- SS Tiefland, a Hansa A Type cargo ship in service 1943-45
