= Brightness (disambiguation) =

Brightness is the polar opposite of darkness.

Brightness may also refer to:

== Scientific ==
- Luminosity
- Brightness (sound)
- Brightness temperature
- Surface Brightness

== Artistic ==
- The Brightness, the third album by American folksinger Anais Mitchell

== See also ==
- Bright (disambiguation)
- Light
- Guangming (disambiguation)
