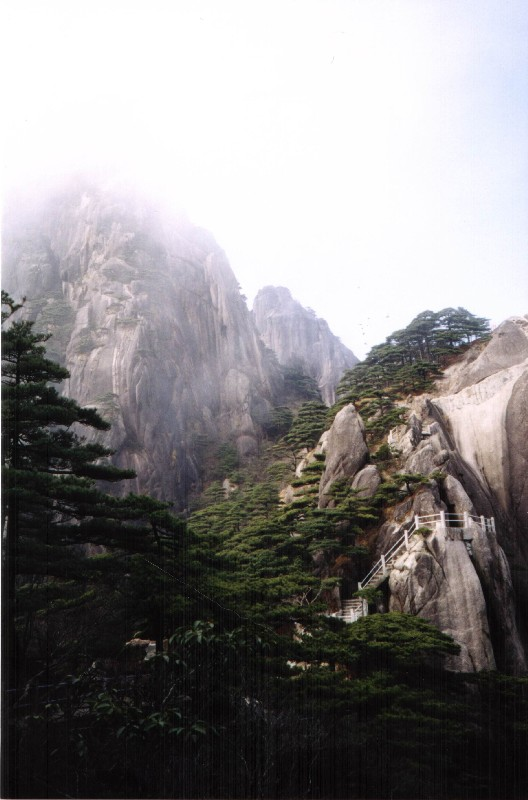
- Huangshan pines on the Huangshan Mountains, Anhui

Conservation status
- Least Concern (IUCN 3.1)

Scientific classification
- Kingdom: Plantae
- Clade: Tracheophytes
- Clade: Gymnosperms
- Division: Pinophyta
- Class: Pinopsida
- Order: Pinales
- Family: Pinaceae
- Genus: Pinus
- Subgenus: P. subg. Pinus
- Section: P. sect. Pinus
- Subsection: P. subsect. Pinus
- Species: P. hwangshanensis

Binomial name
- Pinus hwangshanensis W.Y.Hsia

Synonyms
- Pinus luchuensis subsp. hwangshanensis (W.Y.Hsia) D.Z.Li; Pinus luchuensis var. hwangshanensis (W.Y.Hsia) C.L.Wu; Pinus luchuensis var. shenkanensis Silba

= Pinus hwangshanensis =

Huangshan pine

Species of conifer

Pinus hwangshanensis, the Huangshan pine, is a species of pine, a conifer in the family Pinaceae, endemic to the mountains of eastern China; it is named after the Huangshan Mountains in Anhui, from where it was first described.

== Description ==
Pinus hwangshanensis is a coniferous tree reaching 15–25 metres (49–82 feet) in height, with a very broad, flat-topped crown of long, level branches. The bark is thick, greyish, and scaly plated. The leaves are needle-like, dark green, 2 per fascicle, 5–8 centimetres (2–3 1/4 inches) long and 0.8–1 millimetre (1/32–3/64 in) wide, the persistent fascicle sheath 1 cm (1/2 in) long. The cones are broad squat ovoid, 4–6.5 cm (1 1/2–2 1/2 in) long, yellow-brown, opening when mature in late winter to 5–7 cm broad. The seeds are winged, 5–6 mm (3/16–1/4 in) long with a 1.5–2.5 cm wing. Pollination occurs in mid-spring, with the cones maturing 18–20 months after.

It is closely related to Japanese black pine (P. thunbergii), differing from it in the slenderer leaves, brown (not white) buds and broader cones.

== Distribution and habitat ==
Huangshan pines are endemic to the mountains of eastern China, in the provinces of Anhui, Fujian, Guizhou, Hubei, Hunan, Jiangxi, and Zhejiang.

They typically grow at moderate to high altitudes on steep, rocky crags, and are a major vegetation component in the landscapes of eastern China. Many specimens are venerated for their unique rugged shapes and are frequently portrayed in traditional Chinese paintings.

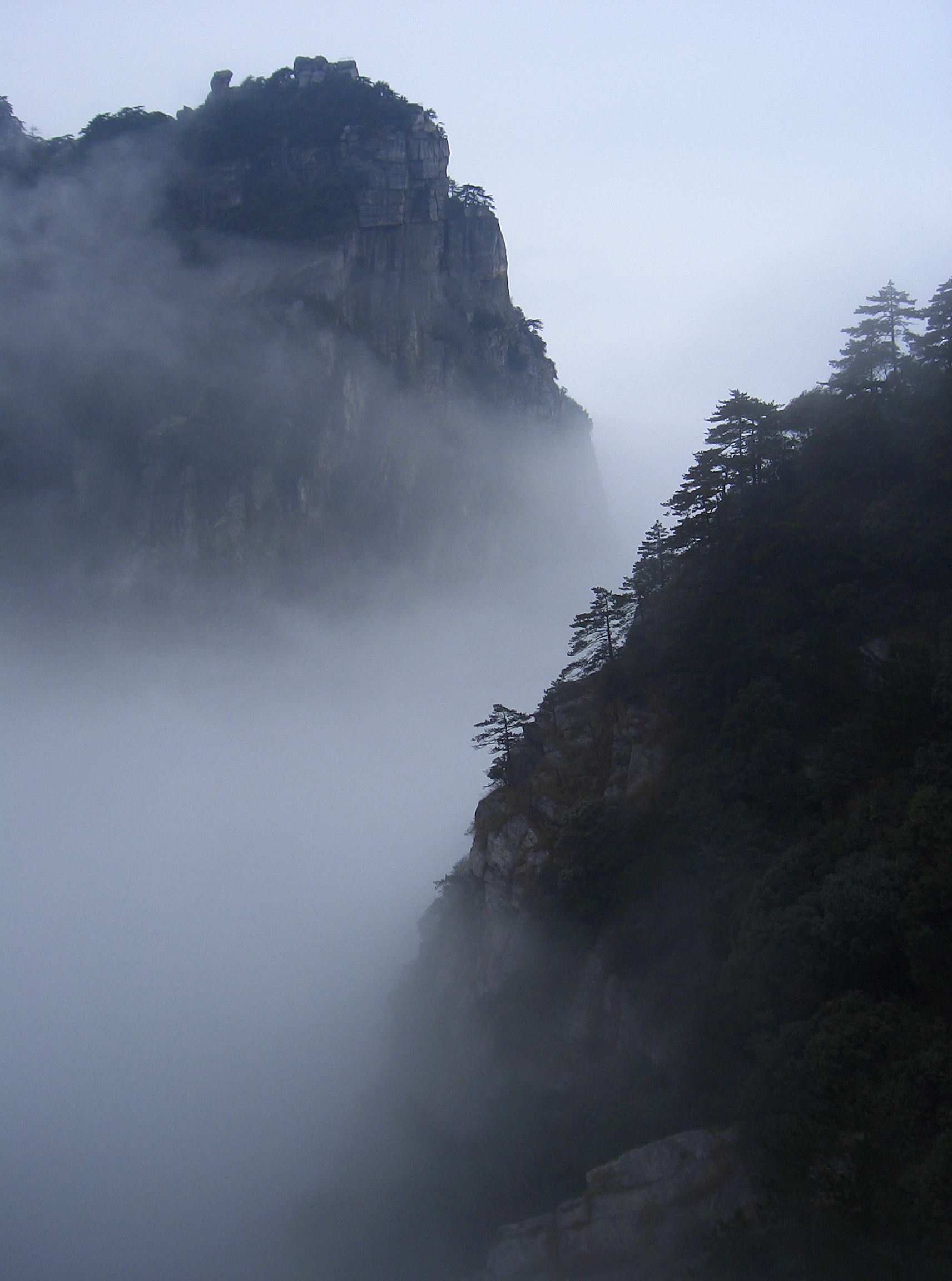
Huangshan pines on Mount Lushan, Jiangxi

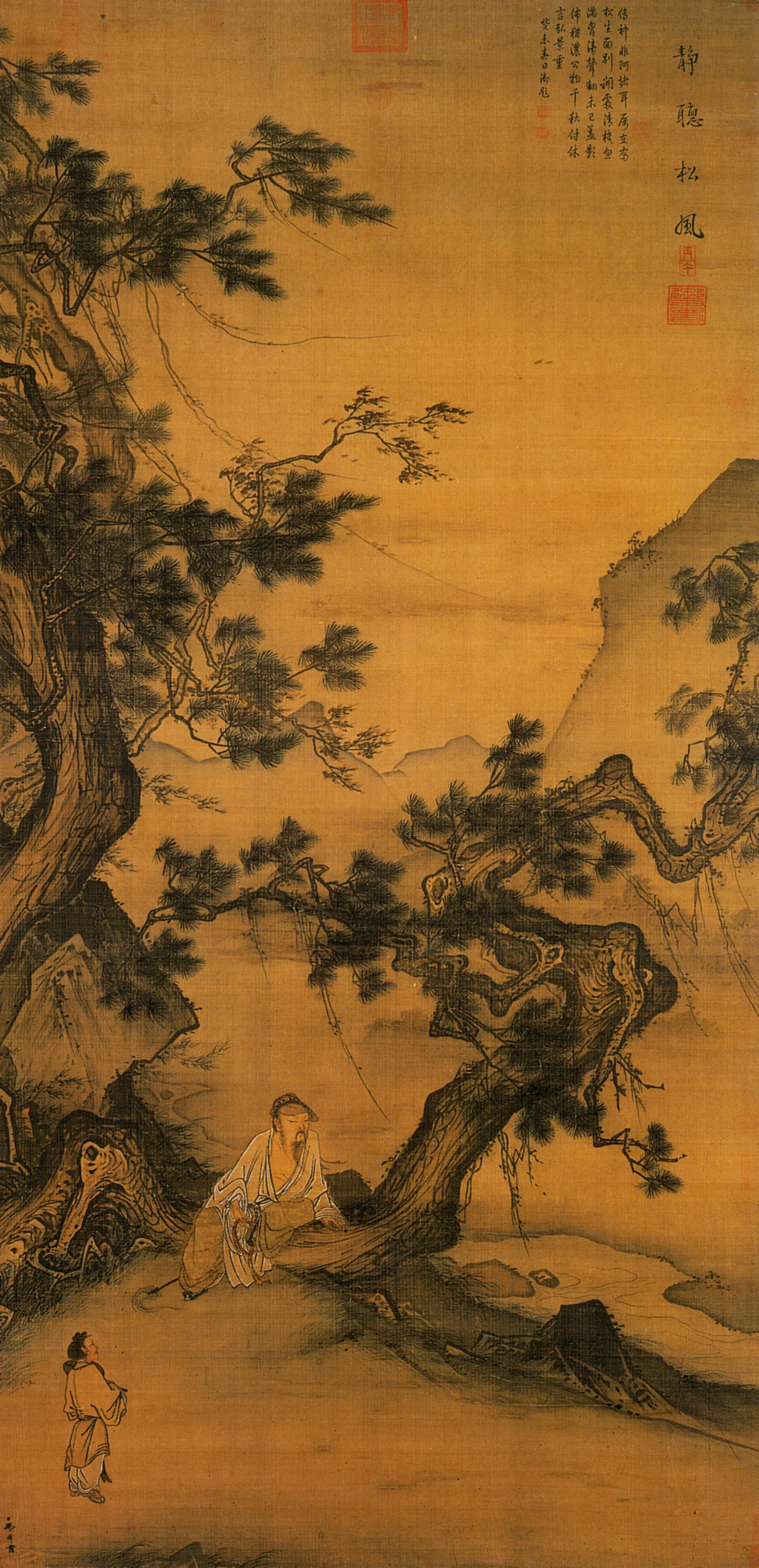
A painting from the Hangzhou area by Ma Lin in 1246
