= William Bright =

William Bright may refer to:

- William O. Bright (1928–2006), American linguist who specialized in Native American and South Asian languages
- William Bright (historian) (1824–1901), English Church historian
- Bill Bright (1921–2003), American evangelist and founder of Campus Crusade for Christ
- William Leatham Bright (1851–1910), English Liberal politician
- William H. Bright (1863–1933), American politician in New Jersey
- William H. Bright Jr. (born 1962), judge of the Connecticut Appellate Court

== See also ==
- Bright (disambiguation)
