= Kōmyō-ji =

Kōmyō-ji (Japanese: 光明寺，Chinese: Guangming-si) is the name of numerous Buddhist temples in Japan and other East Asian communities, and may refer to:

- Kōmyō-ji (Ayabe), a temple in Ayabe, Kyoto Prefecture; see List of National Treasures of Japan (temples)#Treasures
- Kōmyō-ji (Kamakura), in Kamakura, Kanagawa Prefecture
- Guang Ming Temple, Buddhist temple in Orlando, Florida, USA
