= Huangshan =

Mountain range in southern Anhui, China

Huangshan 黃山
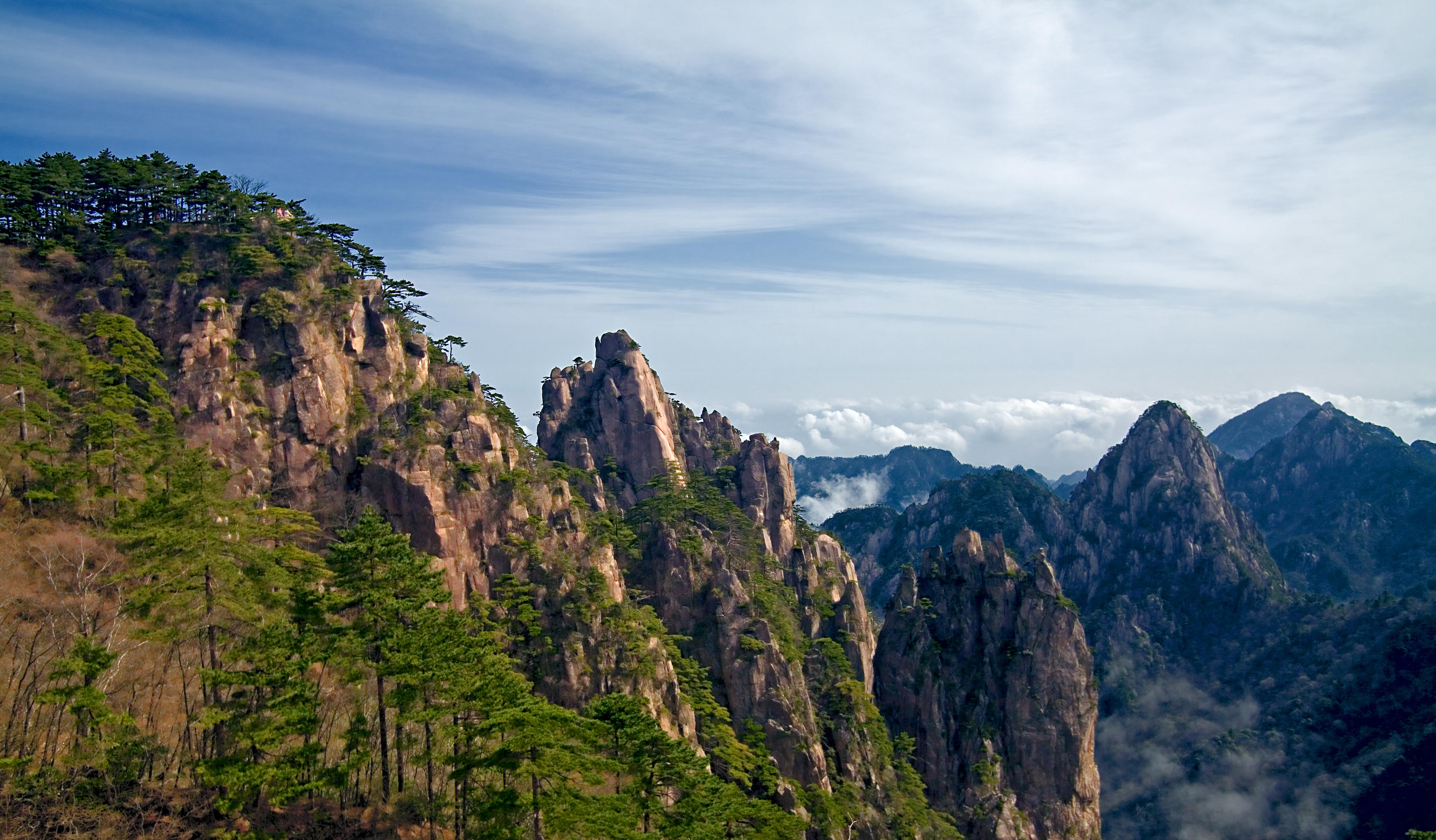
- Panoramic view of the Huangshan landscape

Highest point
- Elevation: 1,864 m (6,115 ft)
- Prominence: 1,734 m (5,689 ft)
- Listing: Ultra, Ribu
- Coordinates: 30°07′30″N 118°10′00″E

Geography
- Location within Northern China Location within China
- Location: Huangshan City, Anhui

UNESCO World Heritage Site
- Official name: Mount Huangshan
- Criteria: Cultural and Natural: (ii), (vii), (x)
- Reference: 547bis
- Inscription: 1990 (14th Session)
- Extensions: 2012
- Area: 16,060 ha (62.0 sq mi)
- Buffer zone: 49,000 ha (190 sq mi)

Huangshan
- "Huangshan" in Simplified (top) and Traditional (bottom) Chinese characters
- Simplified Chinese: 黄山
- Traditional Chinese: 黃山
- Literal meaning: "Yellow Mountain(s)"
Transcriptions
Standard Mandarin
- Hanyu Pinyin: Huángshān
- Wade–Giles: Huang^{2}-shan^{1}
- IPA: [xwǎŋʂán]
Wu
- Romanization: Waon^{入} se^{平}
Yue: Cantonese
- Yale Romanization: Wòhng-sāan
- Jyutping: Wong4-saan1
Southern Min
- Tâi-lô: N̂g-san (col.); Hông-san (lit.)

Huangshan (simplified Chinese: 黄山; traditional Chinese: 黃山), literally meaning the Yellow Mountain(s), is a mountain range in southern Anhui province in eastern China. It was originally called "Yishan", and it was renamed because of a legend that the Yellow Emperor once made alchemy here. Vegetation on the range is thickest below 1,100 meters (3,600 ft), with trees growing up to the treeline at 1,800 meters (5,900 ft).

The area is well known for its scenery, sunsets, peculiarly shaped granite peaks, Huangshan pine trees, hot springs, winter snow, and views of the clouds from above. Huangshan is a frequent subject of traditional Chinese paintings and literature, as well as modern photography. It is a UNESCO World Heritage Site and one of China's major tourist destinations.

== Physical description ==
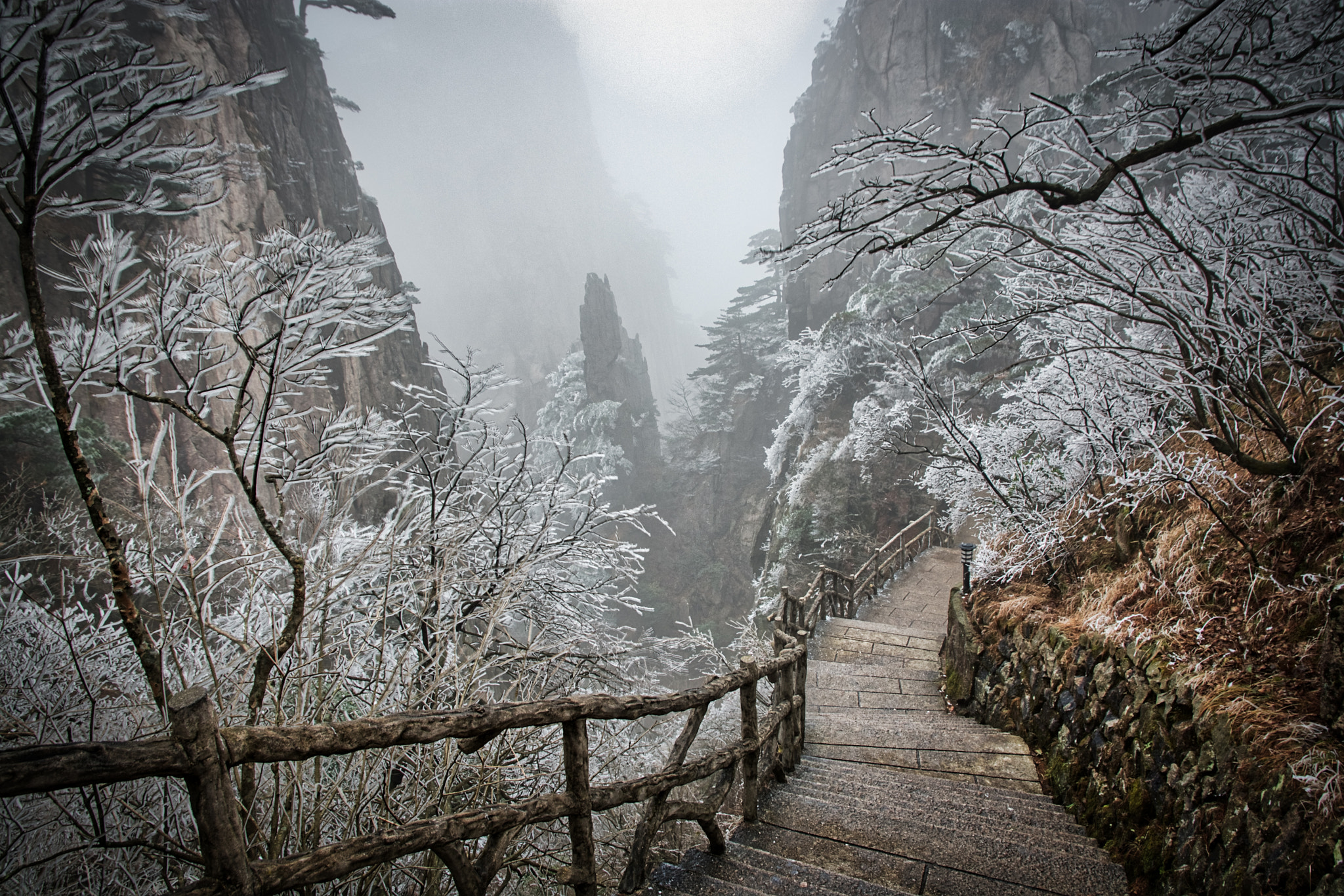
Icy Trees of Huangshan

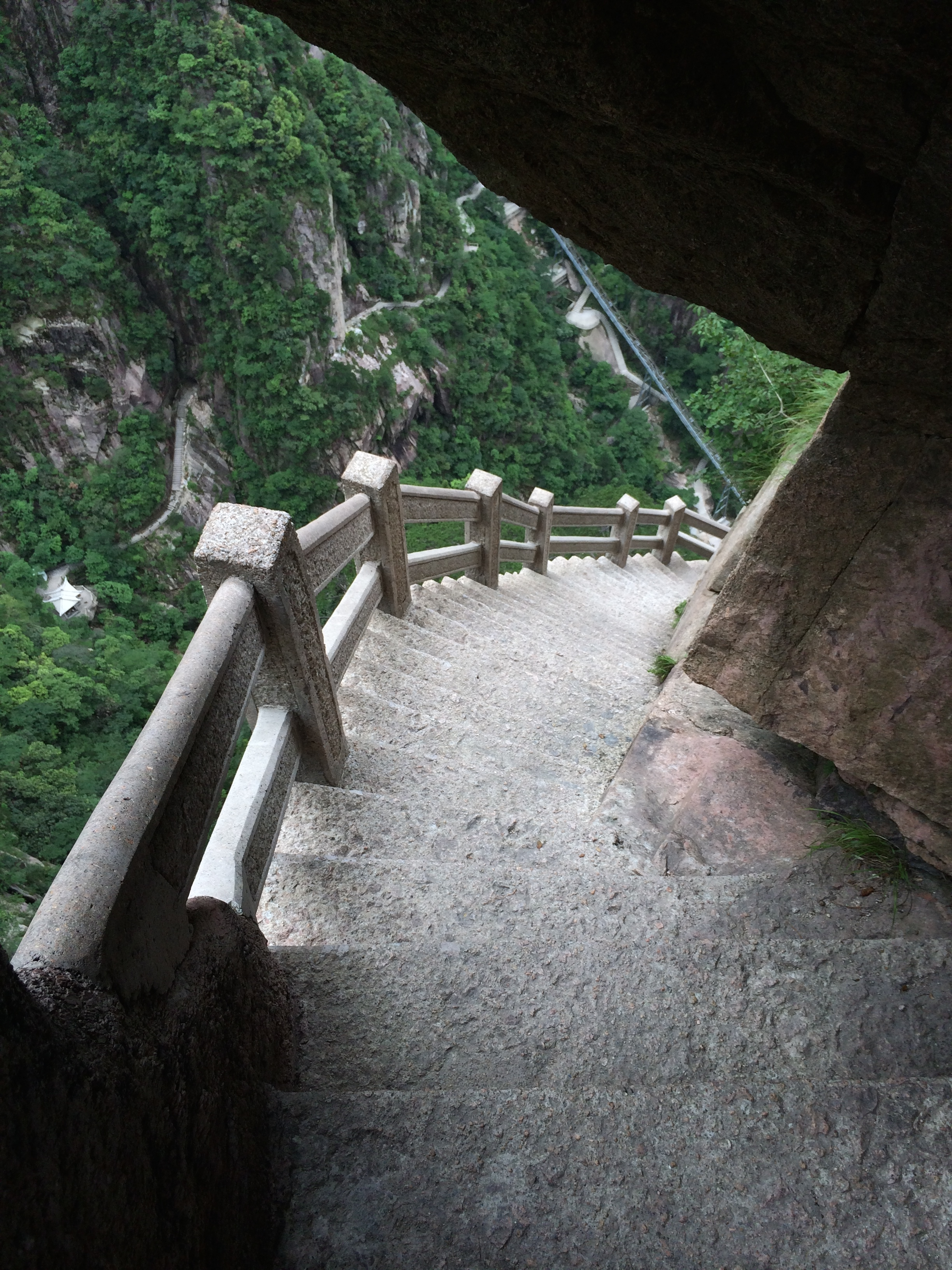
Steps downhill

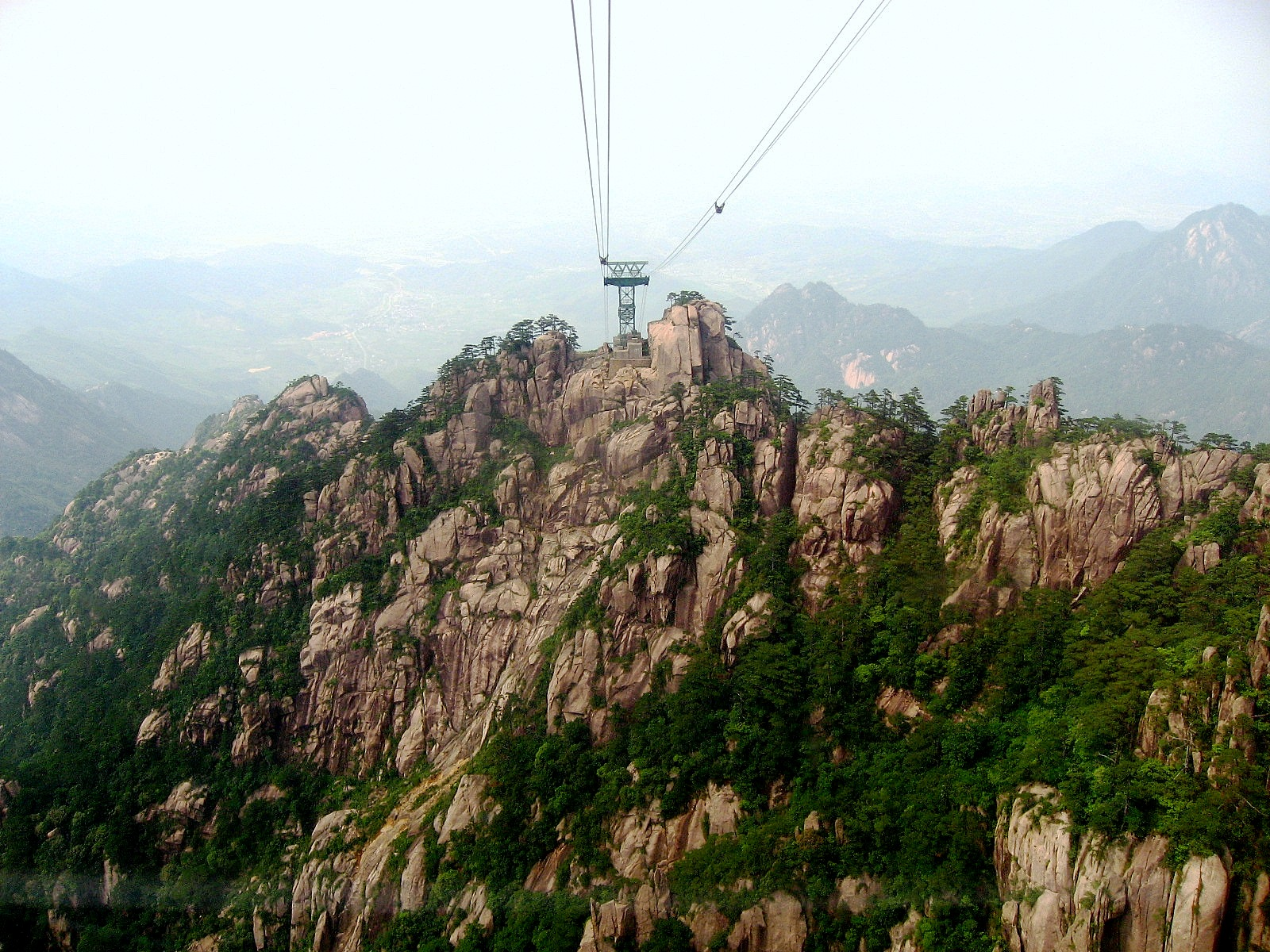
View from a cable car

The Huangshan mountain range has many peaks, some more than 1,000 meters (3,250 feet) high. The three tallest and best-known peaks are Lotus Peak (Lianhua Feng, 1,864 m), Bright Peak (Guangming Ding, 1,860 m) and Celestial Peak (Tiandu Feng, literally Capital of Heaven Peak, 1,829 m). The World Heritage Site covers a core area of 154 square kilometres and a buffer zone of 142 square kilometres. The mountains were formed in the Mesozoic, approximately 100 million years ago, when an ancient sea disappeared due to uplift. Later, in the Quaternary Period, the landscape was shaped by the influence of glaciers.

The vegetation of the area varies with elevation. Mesic forests cover the landscape below 1,100 meters. Deciduous forest stretches from 1,100 meters up to the tree line at 1,800 meters. Above that point, the vegetation consists of alpine grasslands. The area has diverse flora, where one-third of China's bryophyte families and more than half of its fern families are represented. The Huangshan pine (Pinus hwangshanensis) is named after Huangshan and is considered an example of vigor because the trees thrive by growing straight out of the rocks. Many of the pine trees in the area are more than a hundred years old and have been given their own names (such as the Ying Ke Pine, or Welcoming-Guests Pine, which is thought to be more than 1500 years old). The pines vary greatly in shape and size, with the most crooked of the trees being considered the most attractive. Furthermore, Huangshan's moist climate facilitates the growing of tea leaves and it has been called "one of China's premier green tea-growing mountains. Mao feng cha ("Fur Peak Tea"), a well-known local variety of green tea, takes its name from the downy tips of tea leaves found in the Huangshan area.

The mountaintops often offer views of the clouds from above, known as the Sea of Clouds (Chinese: 云海; pinyin: yúnhǎi) or "Huangshan Sea" because the cloud resemble an ocean, and many vistas are known by names such as "North Sea" or "South Sea". One writer remarked on the view of the clouds from Huangshan as follows:

To enjoy the magnificence of a mountain, you have to look upwards in most cases. To enjoy Mount Huangshan, however, you've got to look downward.

The area is also host to notable light effects, such as the renowned sunrises. Watching the sunrise is considered a "mandatory" part of visiting the area. A phenomenon known as Buddha's Light (Chinese: 佛光; pinyin: fóguāng) is also well-known and, on average, Buddha's Light only appears a couple of times per month. In addition, Huangshan has multiple hot springs, most of them located at the foot of the Purple Cloud Peak. The water stays at 42 °C (107.6 °F) all year, and has a high concentration of carbonates. The waters are said to help prevent skin, joint, and nerve illness.

== History ==
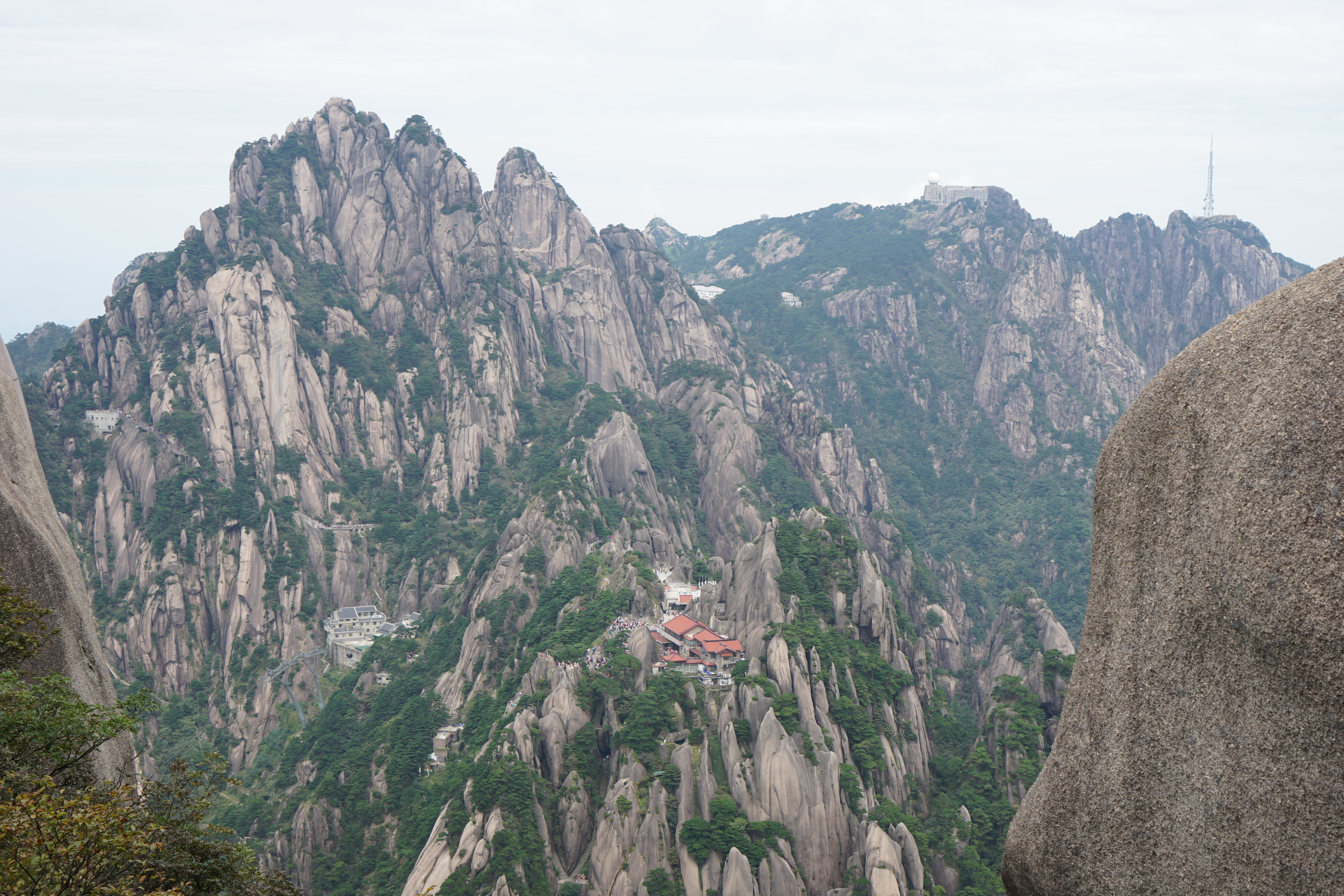
Huangshan, 蓮花峰

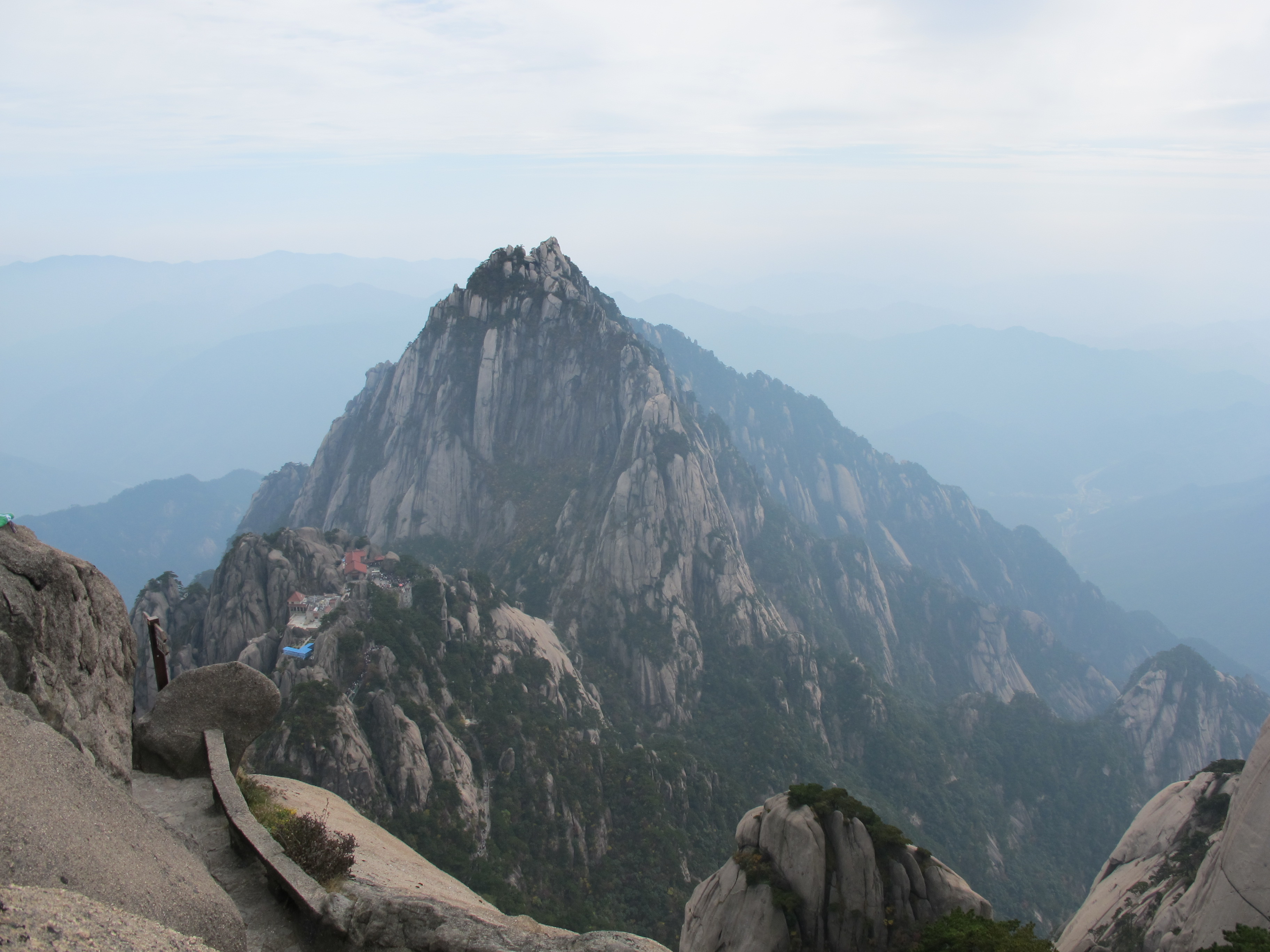
Huangshan, 天都峰

Huangshan was formed approximately 100 million years ago and gained its unique rock formations in the Quaternary Glaciation.

During the Qin dynasty, Huangshan was known as Yishan (Mount Yi). In 747 AD, its name was changed to Huangshan (Mount Huang) by imperial decree; the name is commonly thought to have been coined in honor of Huang Di (the Yellow Emperor), a legendary Chinese emperor and the mythological ancestor of the Han Chinese. One legend states that Huangshan was the location from which the Yellow Emperor ascended to Heaven. Another legend states that the Yellow Emperor "cultivated moral character and refined Pills of Immortality in the mountains, and in so doing gave the mountains his name. The first use of this name "Huangshan" often is attributed to Chinese poet Li Bai. Huangshan was fairly inaccessible and little-known in ancient times, but its change of name in 747 AD seems to have brought the area more attention; from then on, the area was visited frequently and many temples were built there.

Huangshan is known for its stone steps, carved into the side of the mountain, of which there may be more than 60,000 throughout the area. The date at which work on the steps began is unknown, but they have been said to be more than 1,500 years old.

Over the years, many scenic spots and physical features on the mountain have been named; many of the names have narratives behind them. For example, one legend tells of a man who did not believe the tales of Huangshan's beauty and went to the mountains to see them; almost immediately, he was converted to the same view. One of the peaks he is said to have visited was named Shixin (始信), roughly meaning "start to believe".

In 1982, Huangshan was declared a "site of scenic beauty and historic interest" by the State Council of China. It was named a UNESCO World Heritage Site in 1990 for its scenery and for its role as a habitat for rare and threatened species. Subsequently, certified as a National Geopark, and then as a regional geopark (Asia Pacific Geopark Network), it was admitted as a UNESCO Global Geopark in 2004.

In 2002, Huangshan was named the "sister mountain" of Jungfrau in the Swiss Alps.

== Artistic and scientific inspirations ==
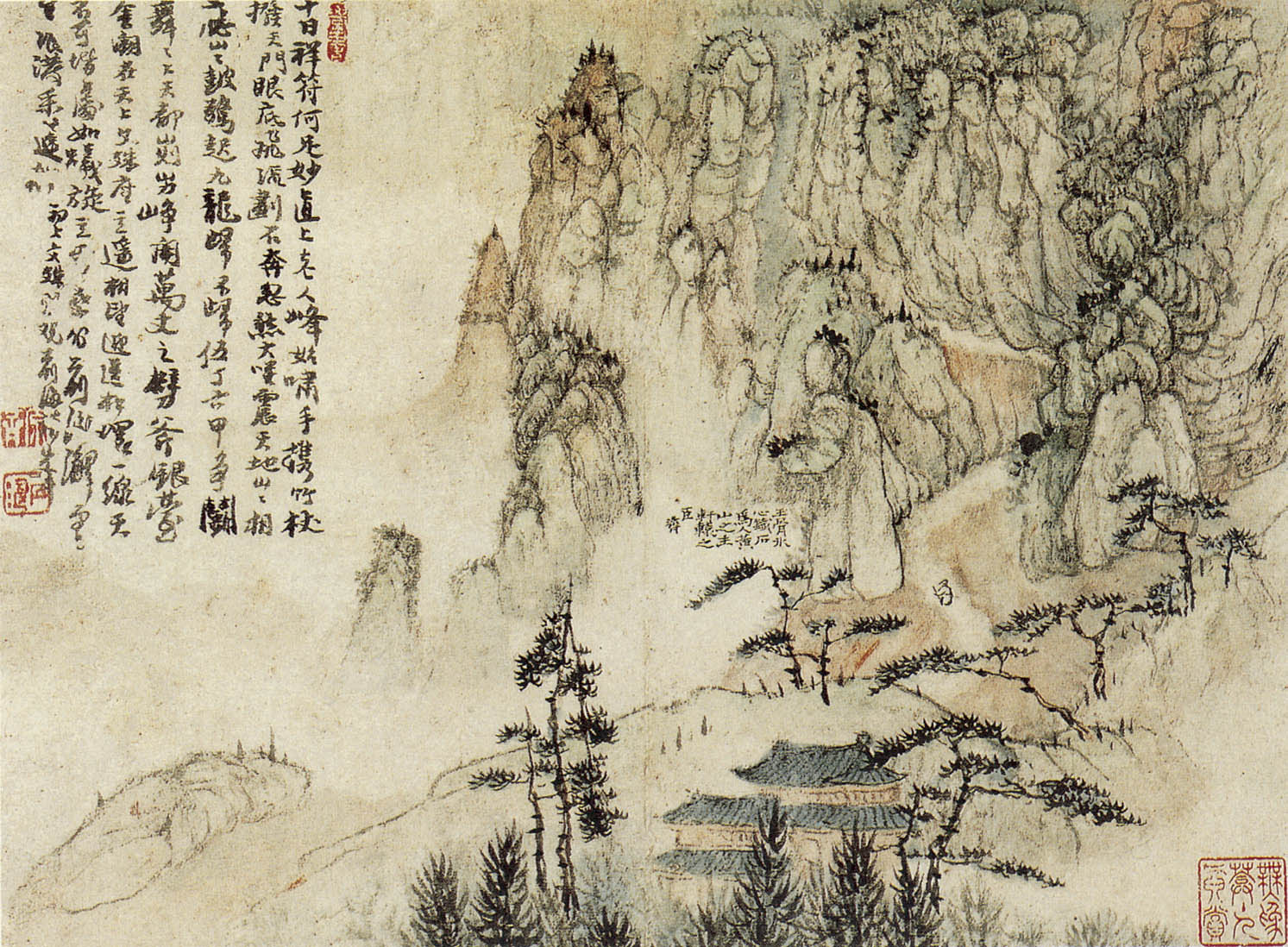
Ink painting depicting Huangshan by Shitao, 1670

Much of Huangshan's reputation derives from its significance in Chinese arts and literature. In addition to inspiring poets such as Li Bai, Huangshan and the scenery therein have been the frequent subject of poetry and artwork, especially Chinese ink painting and, more recently, photography. Overall, from the Tang dynasty to the end of the Qing dynasty, more than 20,000 poems were written about Huangshan, and a school of painting was named after it. The mountains also have appeared in modern works; director James Cameron cited Huangshan as one of his influences in designing the fictional world of his 2009 film Avatar, and Chinese animated series Stitch & Ai, a spin-off of Disney's Lilo & Stitch franchise, is set in the Huangshan mountains.

The area has also been a location for scientific research because of its diversity of flora and wildlife. In the early part of the twentieth century, the geology and vegetation of Huangshan were the subjects of multiple studies by both Chinese and foreign scientists. The mountain is still a subject of research. For example, in the late twentieth century, a team of researchers used the area for a field study of Tibetan macaques, a local species of monkey.

== Tourism ==
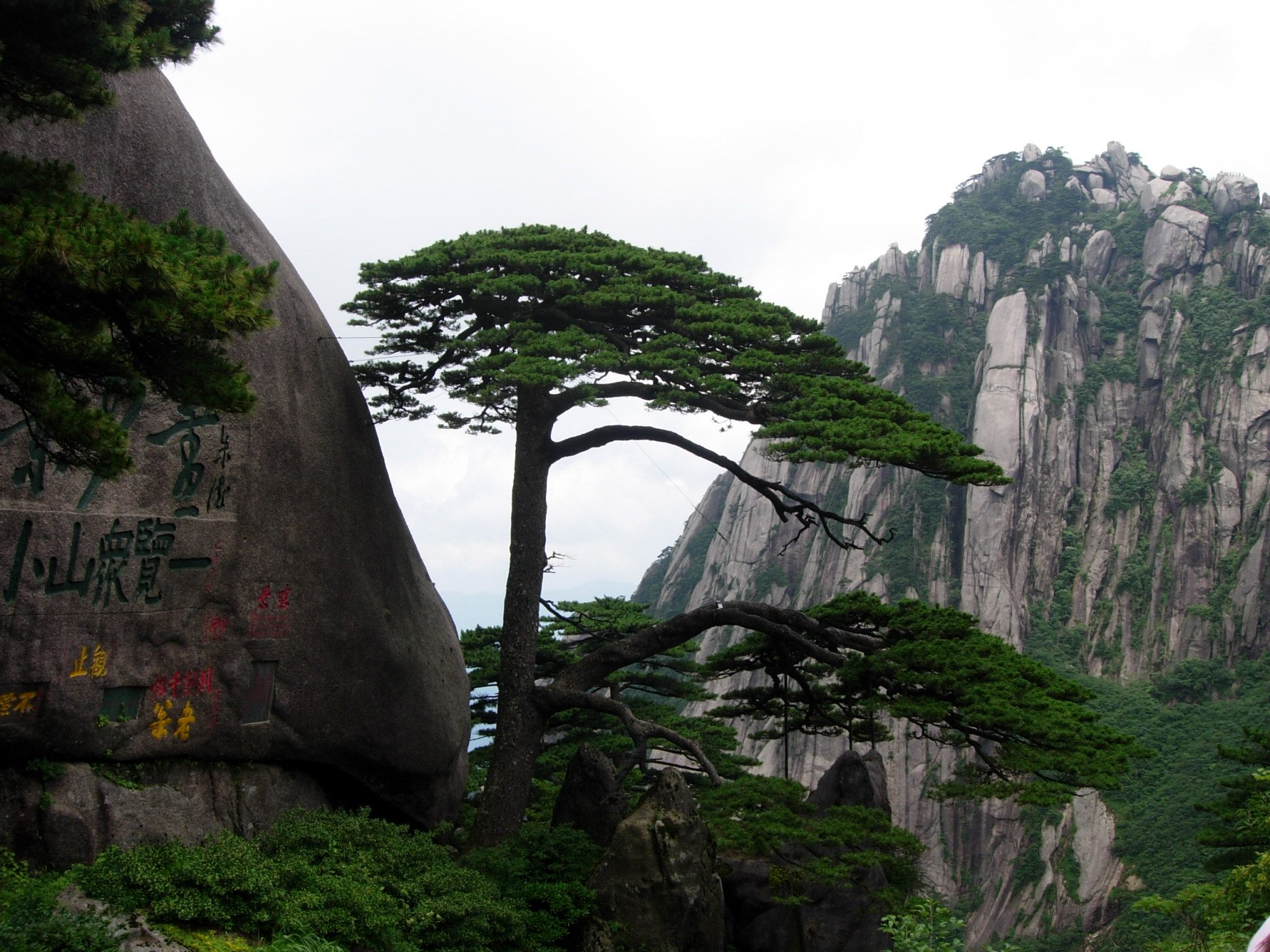
Ying Ke Pine, literally welcome Pine

Having at least 140 sections open to visitors, Huangshan is a major tourist destination in China. Huangshan City changed its name from Tunxi (屯溪) in 1987 in order to promote Huangshan tourism. In 2007, more than 1.5 million tourists visited the mountain. The city is linked by rail and by air to Shanghai, and also is accessible from cities such as Hangzhou, Zhejiang and Wuhu, Anhui. Buses connect Huangshan City to the base of the mountain, where visitors can take a cable car or hike to the summit.

There are more than 50 kilometers of footpaths providing access to scenic areas for visitors and staff of the facilities. Throughout the area there are hotels and guest houses that accommodate overnight visitors, many of whom hike up the mountains, spend the night at one of the peaks to view the sunrise, and then descend by a different route the next day. The area is classified as a AAAAA scenic area by the China National Tourism Administration.

The hotels, restaurants, and other facilities at the top of the mountain are serviced and kept stocked by porters who carry resources around the mountain on foot, hanging their cargo from long poles balanced over their shoulders or backs.

== Climate ==
Huangshan has a humid continental climate (Köppen Climate Classification Dfb) or a subtropical highland climate (Cfb) depending on the isotherm used. Its elevation makes it colder and wetter than the rest of Anhui.

Climate data for Huangshan, elevation 1,840 m (6,040 ft), (1991–2020 normals, extremes 1981–present)
Month	Jan	Feb	Mar	Apr	May	Jun	Jul	Aug	Sep	Oct	Nov	Dec	Year
Record high °C (°F)	12.9 (55.2)	13.8 (56.8)	19.0 (66.2)	22.3 (72.1)	24.5 (76.1)	25.7 (78.3)	27.6 (81.7)	27.1 (80.8)	26.0 (78.8)	25.2 (77.4)	17.7 (63.9)	14.2 (57.6)	27.6 (81.7)
Mean daily maximum °C (°F)	1.5 (34.7)	3.5 (38.3)	7.2 (45.0)	12.3 (54.1)	16.2 (61.2)	18.3 (64.9)	20.8 (69.4)	20.6 (69.1)	17.4 (63.3)	13.2 (55.8)	8.9 (48.0)	3.4 (38.1)	11.9 (53.5)
Daily mean °C (°F)	−1.8 (28.8)	0.1 (32.2)	3.5 (38.3)	8.6 (47.5)	12.8 (55.0)	15.6 (60.1)	18.0 (64.4)	17.7 (63.9)	14.3 (57.7)	9.9 (49.8)	5.6 (42.1)	0.1 (32.2)	8.7 (47.7)
Mean daily minimum °C (°F)	−4.9 (23.2)	−3.1 (26.4)	0.1 (32.2)	5.4 (41.7)	9.9 (49.8)	13.4 (56.1)	16.1 (61.0)	15.7 (60.3)	11.9 (53.4)	7.1 (44.8)	2.6 (36.7)	−3.1 (26.4)	5.9 (42.7)
Record low °C (°F)	−22.0 (−7.6)	−19.1 (−2.4)	−15.9 (3.4)	−11.7 (10.9)	−4.7 (23.5)	1.3 (34.3)	8.5 (47.3)	6.8 (44.2)	−0.6 (30.9)	−9.8 (14.4)	−19.0 (−2.2)	−22.7 (−8.9)	−22.7 (−8.9)
Average precipitation mm (inches)	99.5 (3.92)	115.3 (4.54)	175.8 (6.92)	222.0 (8.74)	286.2 (11.27)	481.4 (18.95)	370.7 (14.59)	301.2 (11.86)	147.4 (5.80)	90.1 (3.55)	91.4 (3.60)	68.0 (2.68)	2,449 (96.42)
Average precipitation days (≥ 0.1 mm)	14.5	13.9	17.0	16.2	17.1	18.8	16.8	19.2	14.0	10.9	11.1	10.8	180.3
Average snowy days	9.8	6.8	5.4	0.9	0	0	0	0	0	0.1	2.0	6.5	31.5
Average relative humidity (%)	67	73	76	77	79	88	92	92	87	71	64	59	77
Mean monthly sunshine hours	142.4	129.7	136.5	144.6	152.2	99.6	123.3	112.0	124.7	168.9	159.6	164.3	1,657.8
Percentage possible sunshine	44	41	37	37	36	24	29	28	34	48	51	52	38
Source: China Meteorological Administration All-time October high

== Panoramas ==
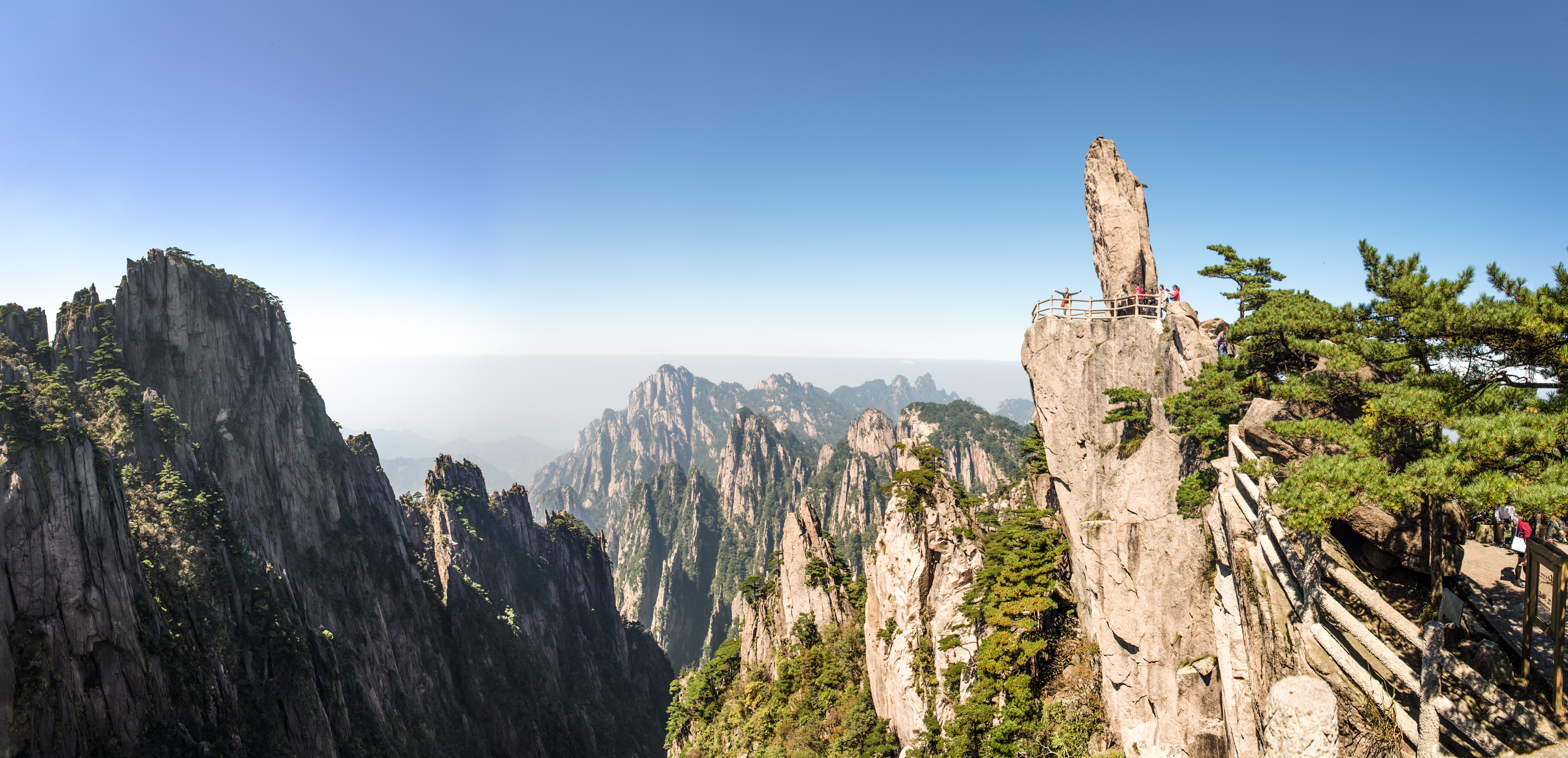
View at Feilai Peak (飞来峰)

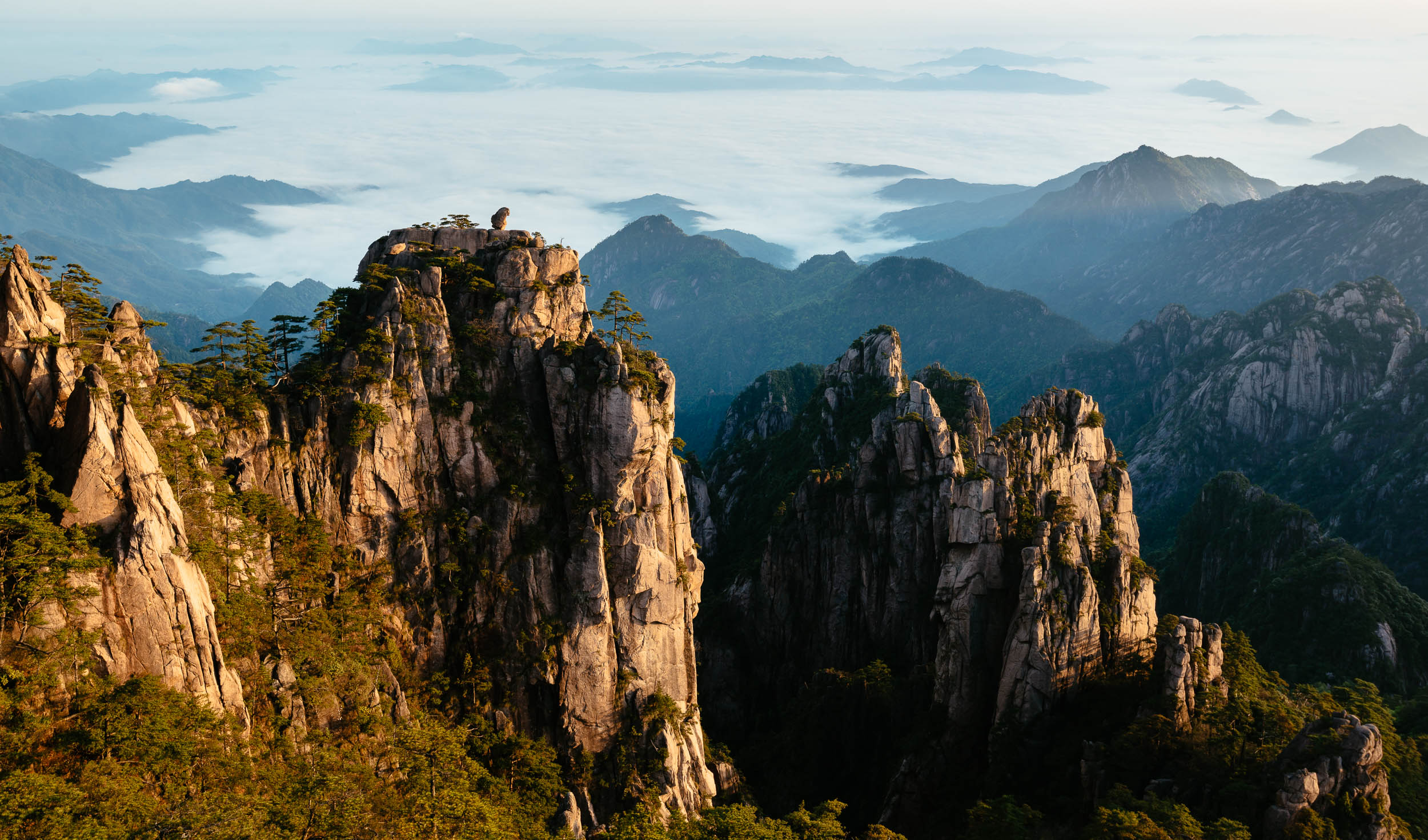
View from Stone Monkey Gazing at the Sea of Cloud (猴子观海)

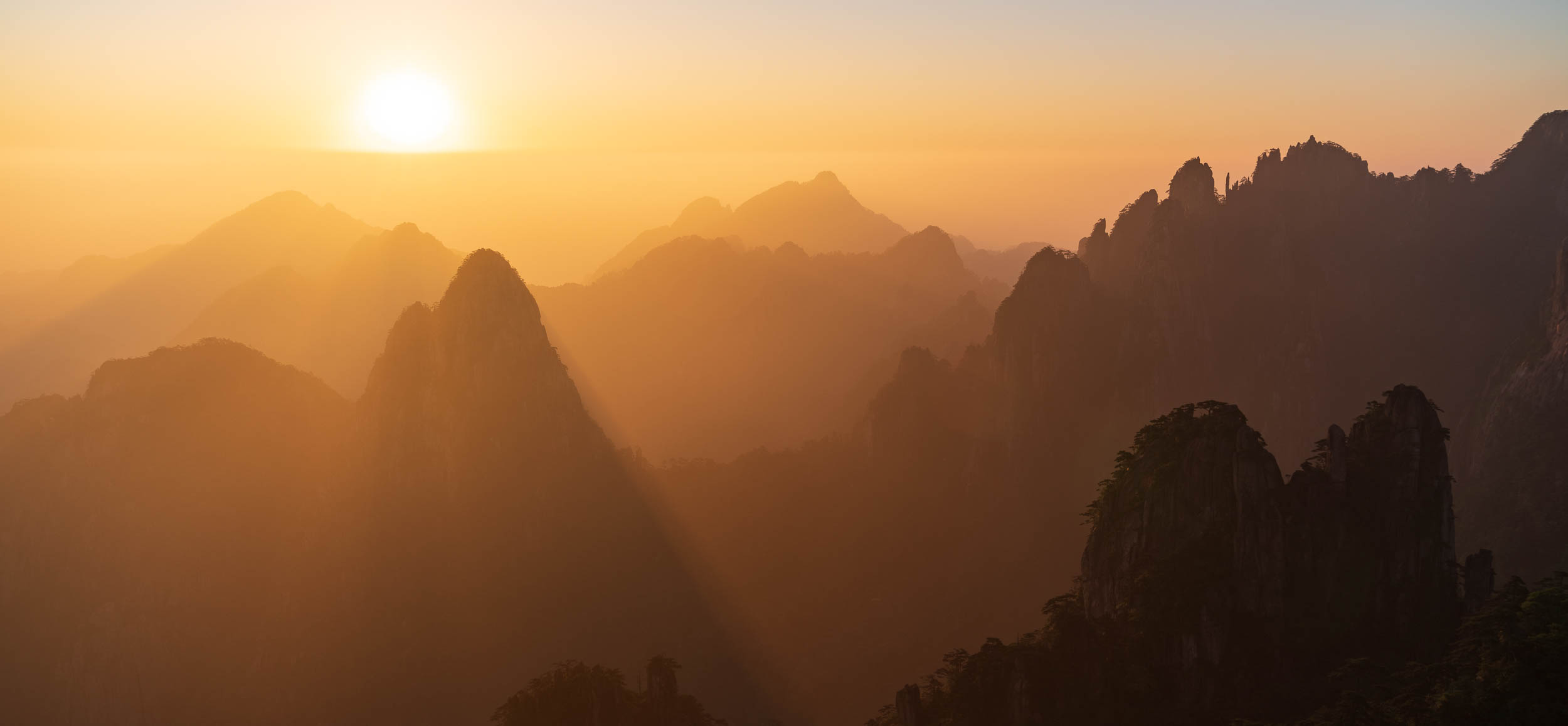
Sunrise viewed from Stone Monkey Gazing at the Sea of Cloud (猴子观海)

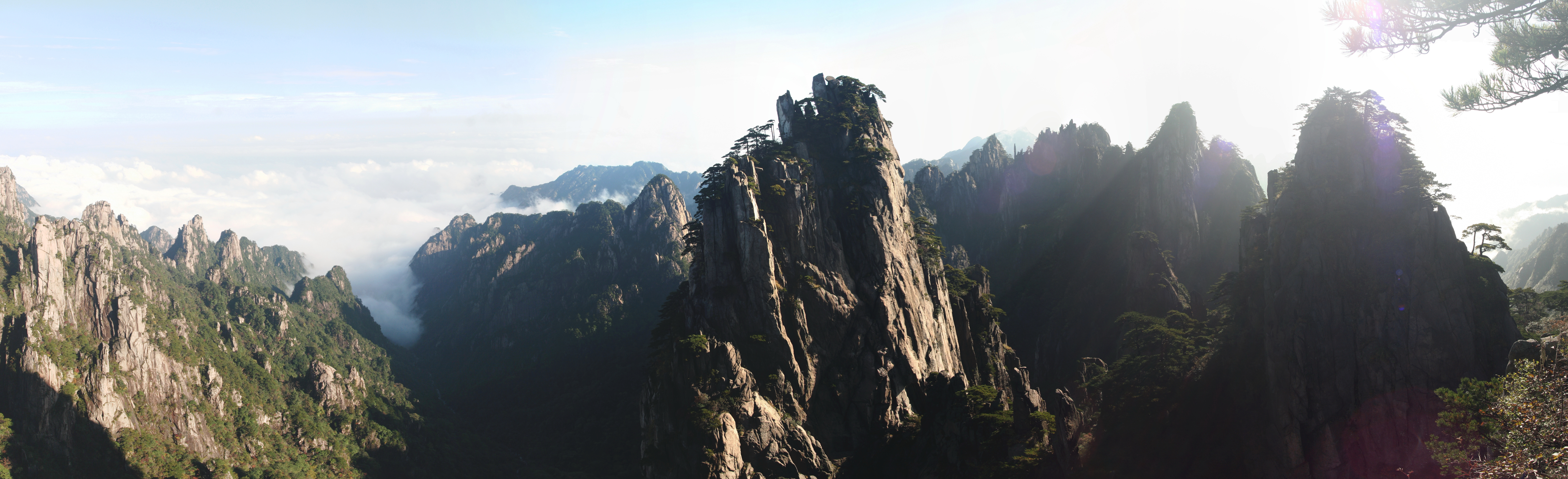
Environment of Huangshan

== Image gallery ==
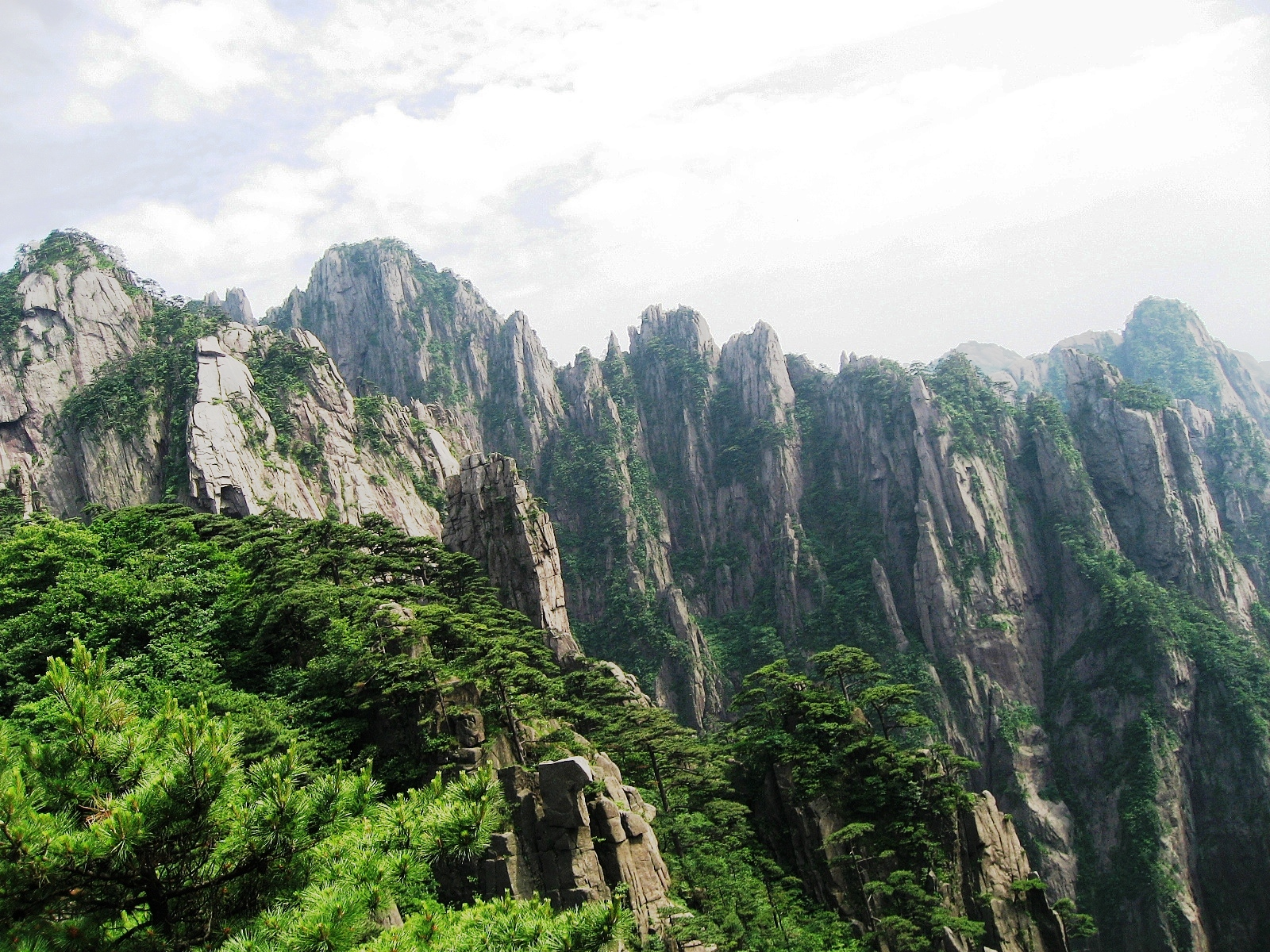
View from a cable car

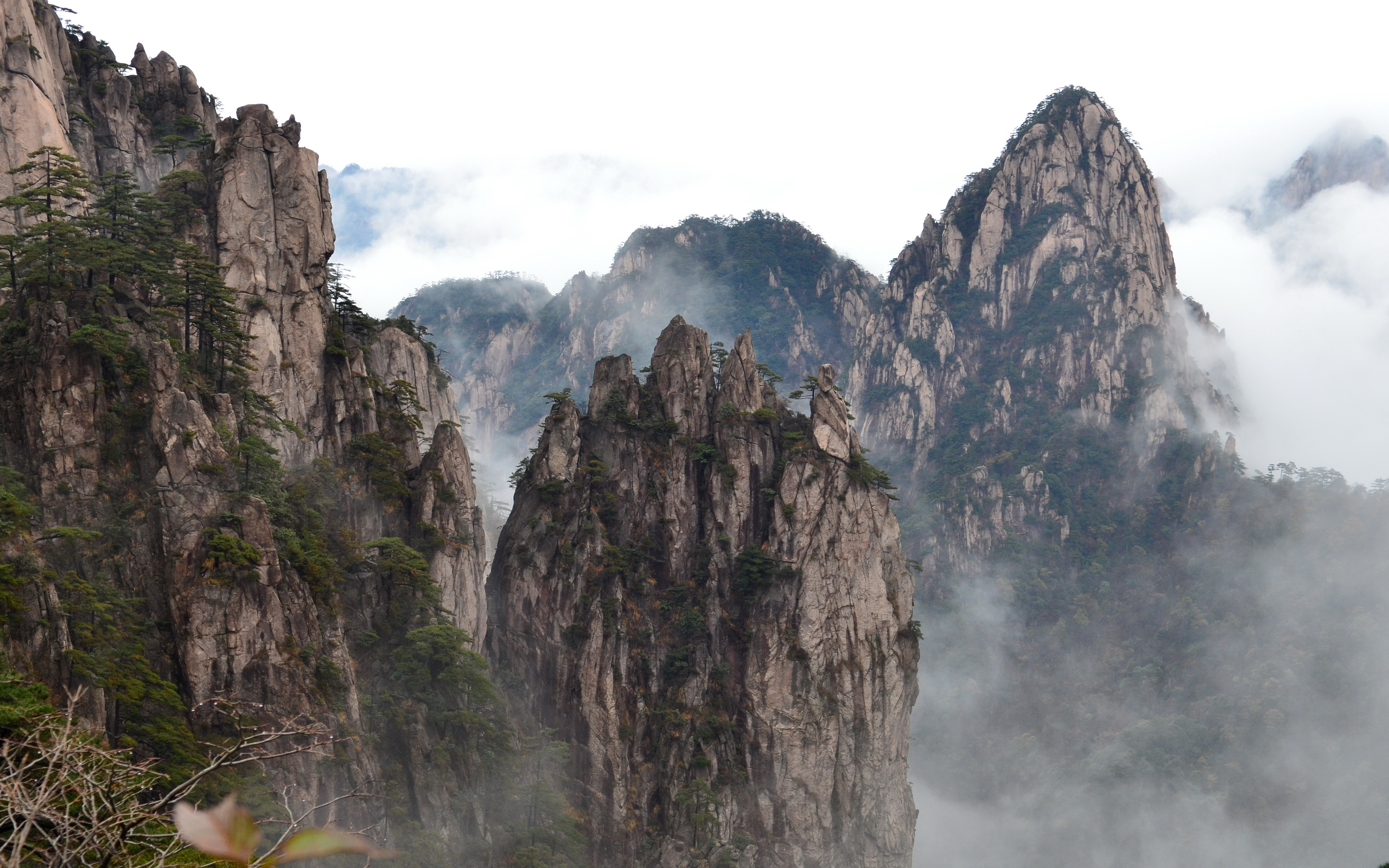
Bijia Peak

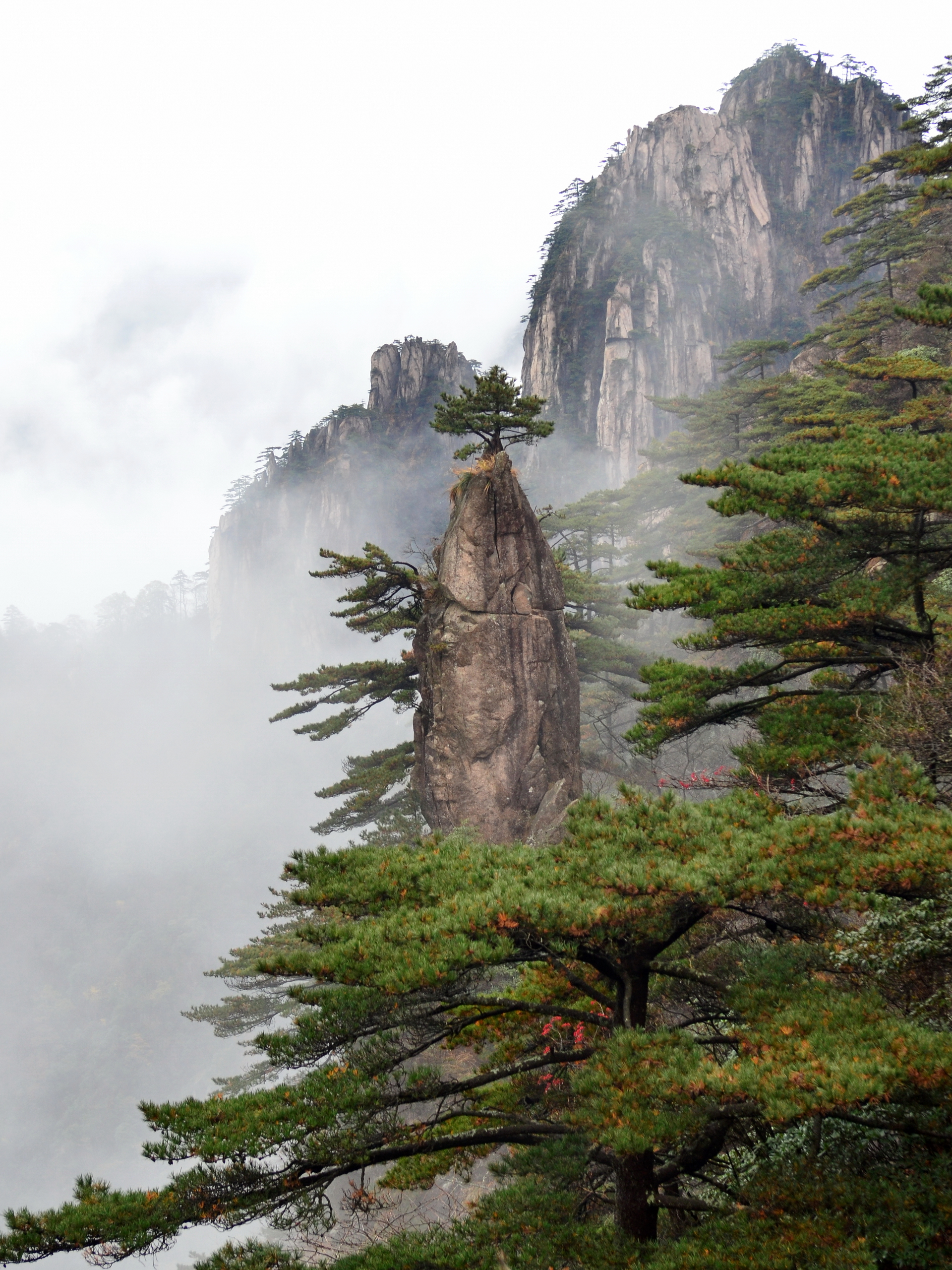

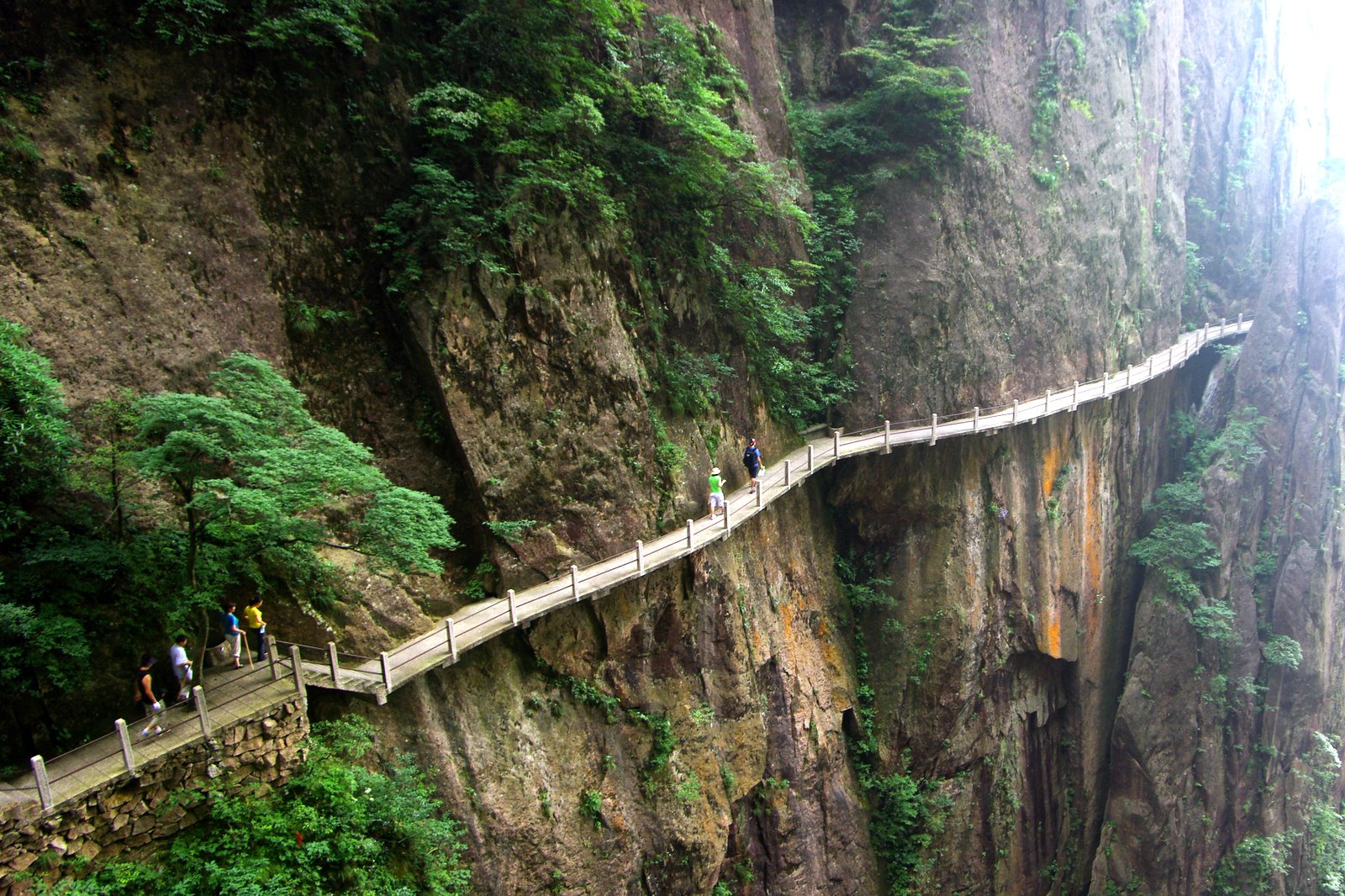
Artificial steps on the cliffs of Huangshan

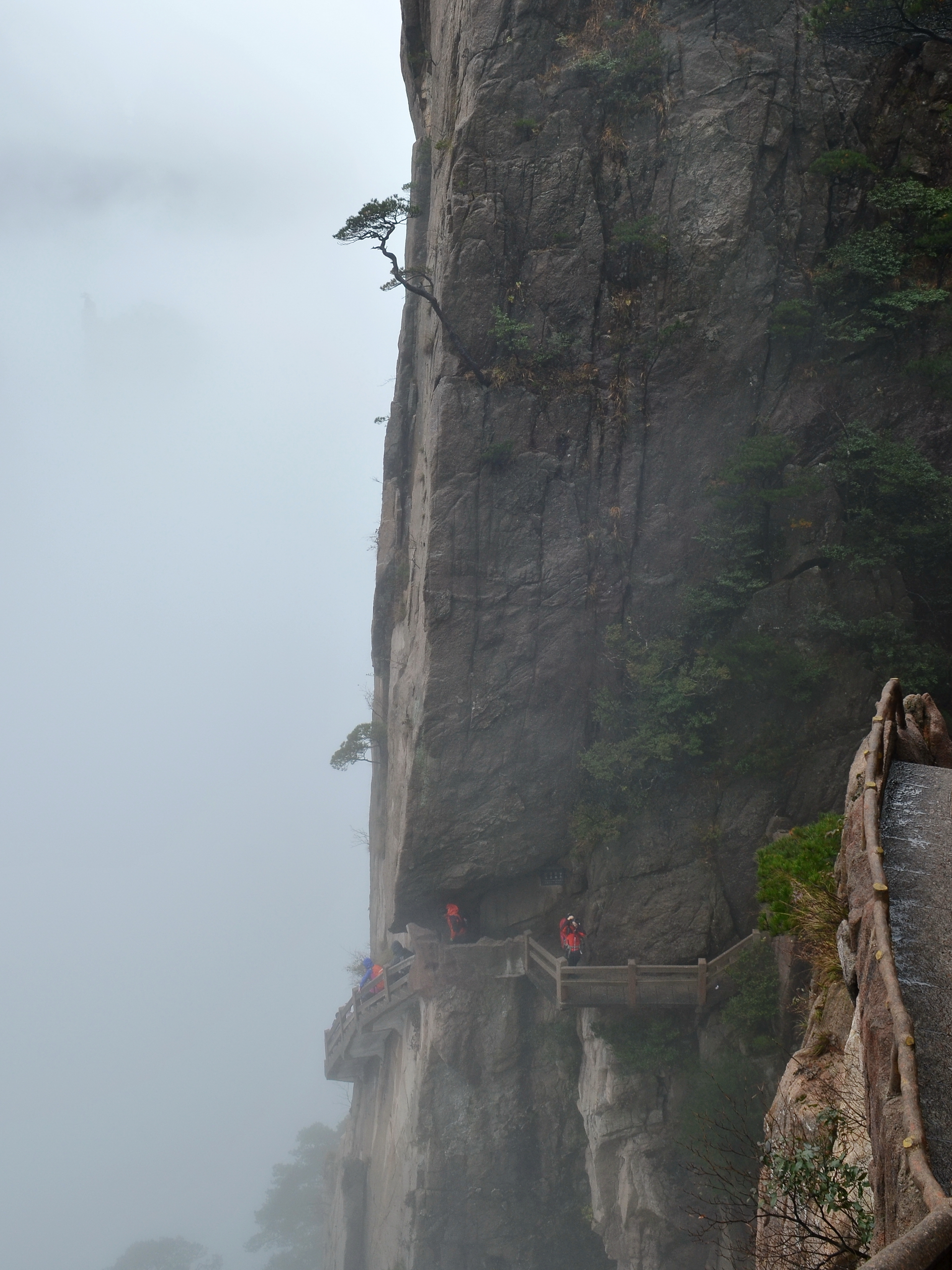
Xihai Great Canyon

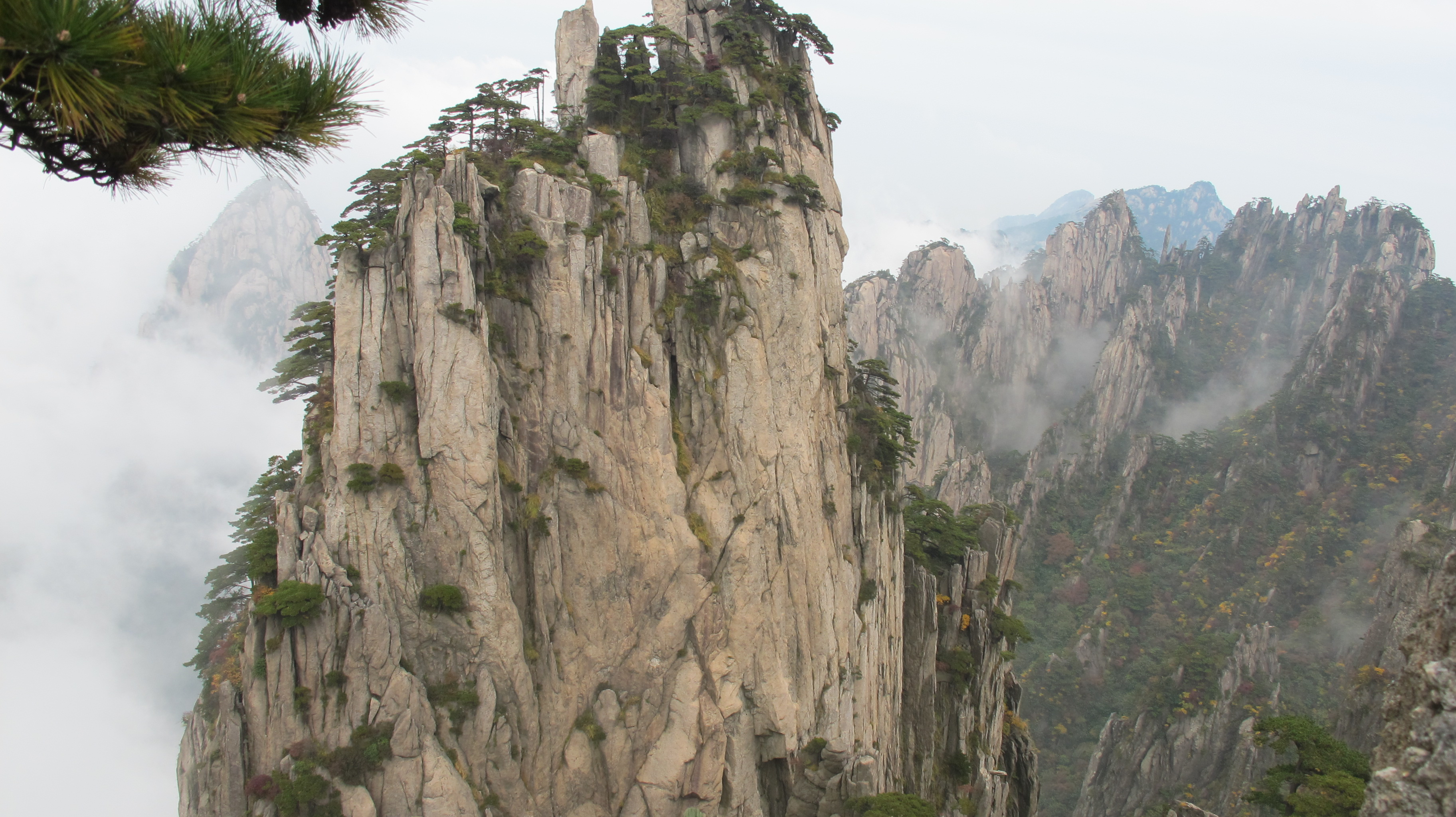
Shixin Peak

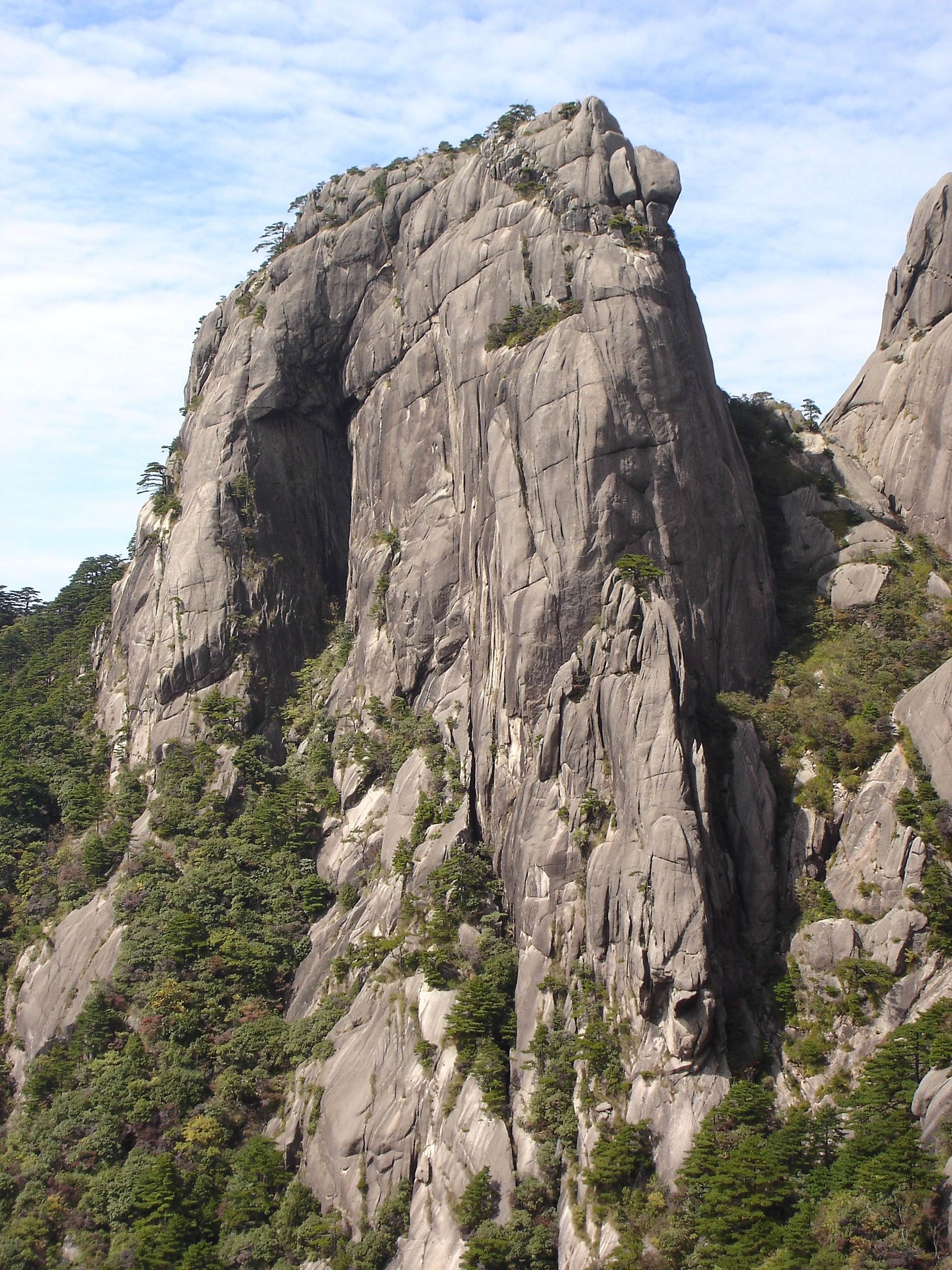
A rock formation in Huangshan

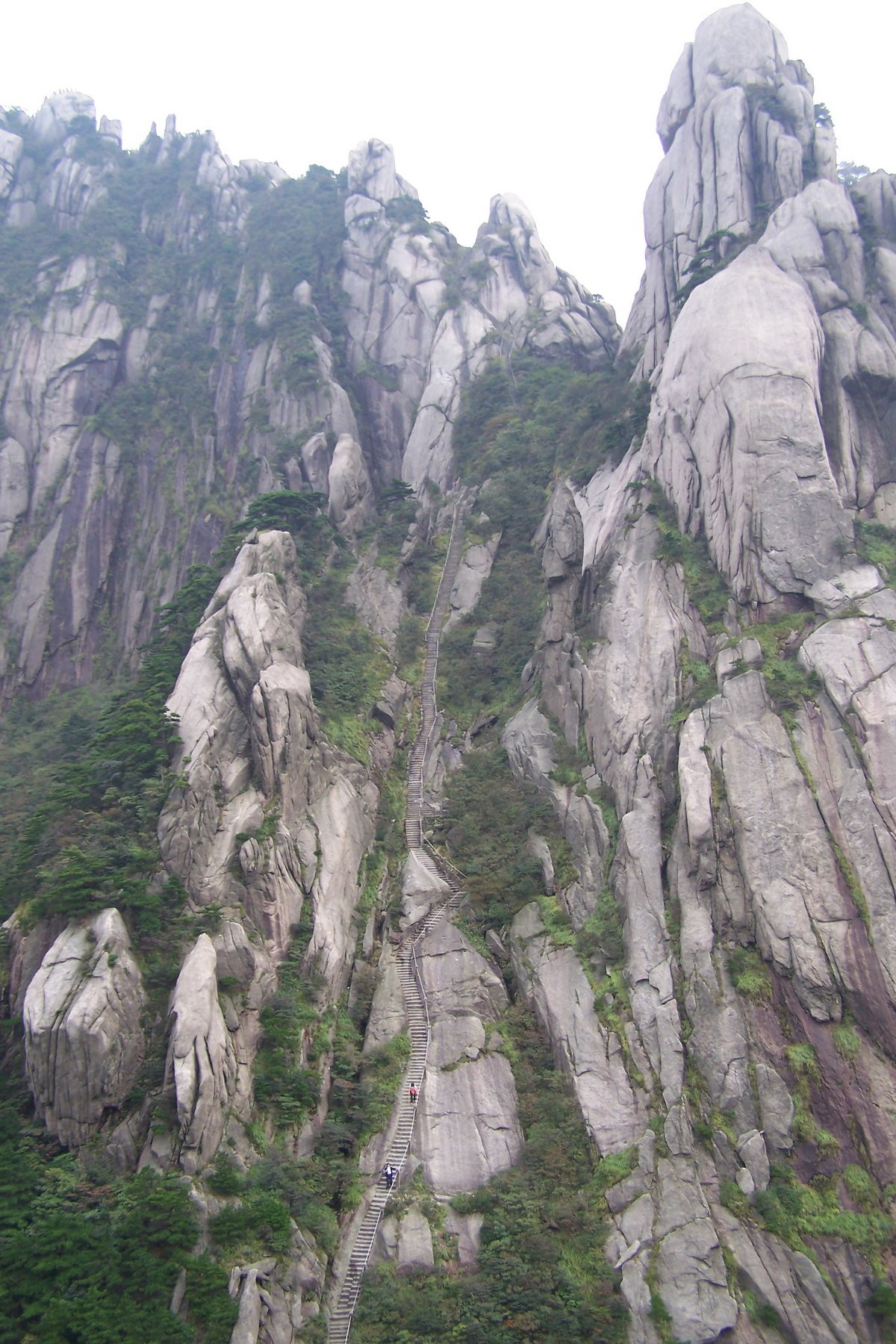
Carved steps to Tiandu Peak

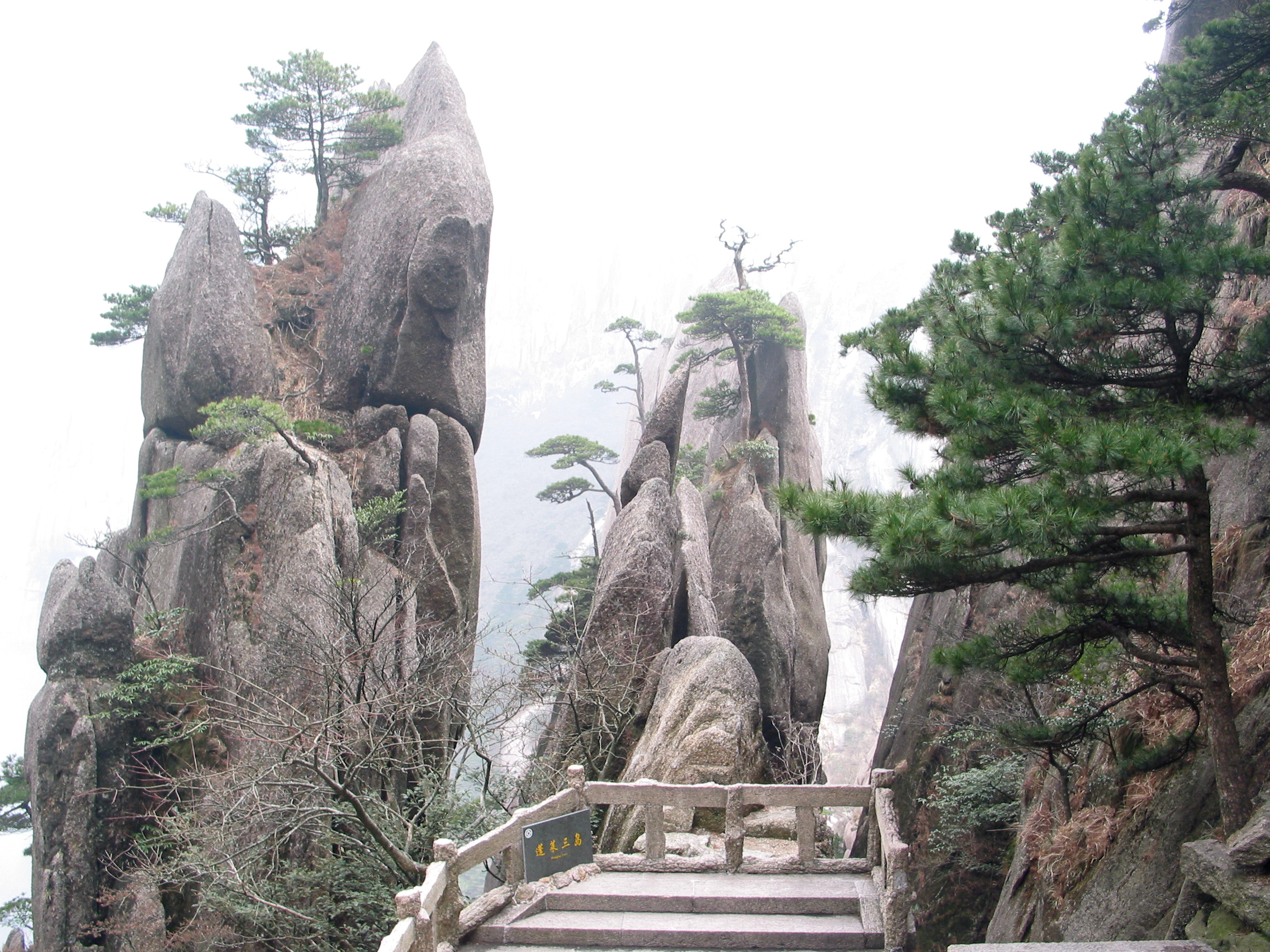
A rock formation in Huangshan

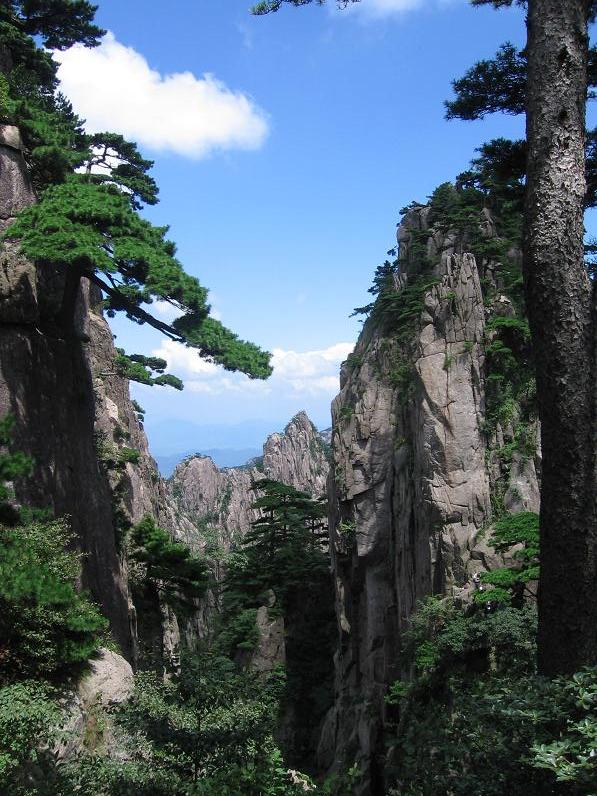
Huangshan pines

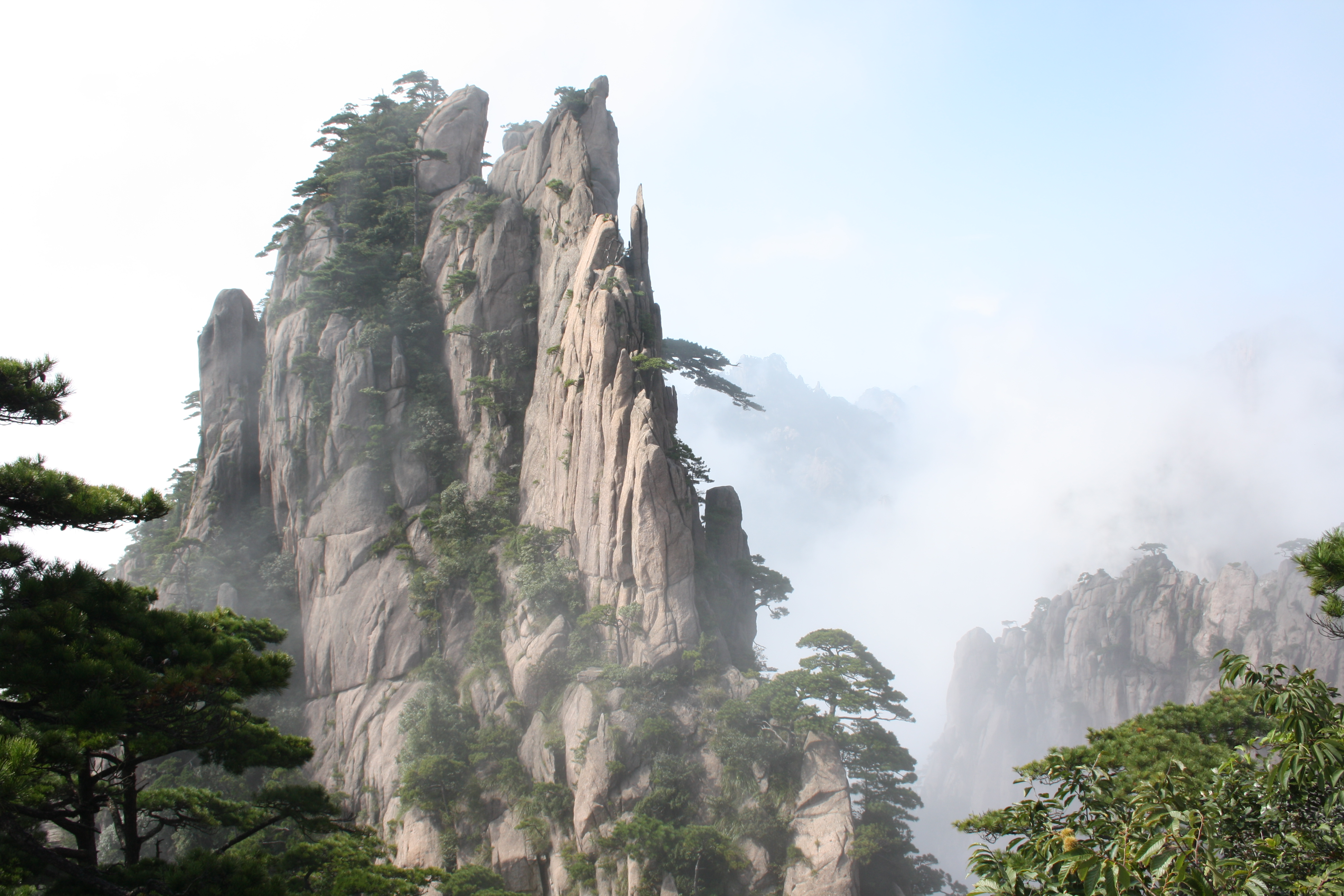
Huangshan with trees and clouds

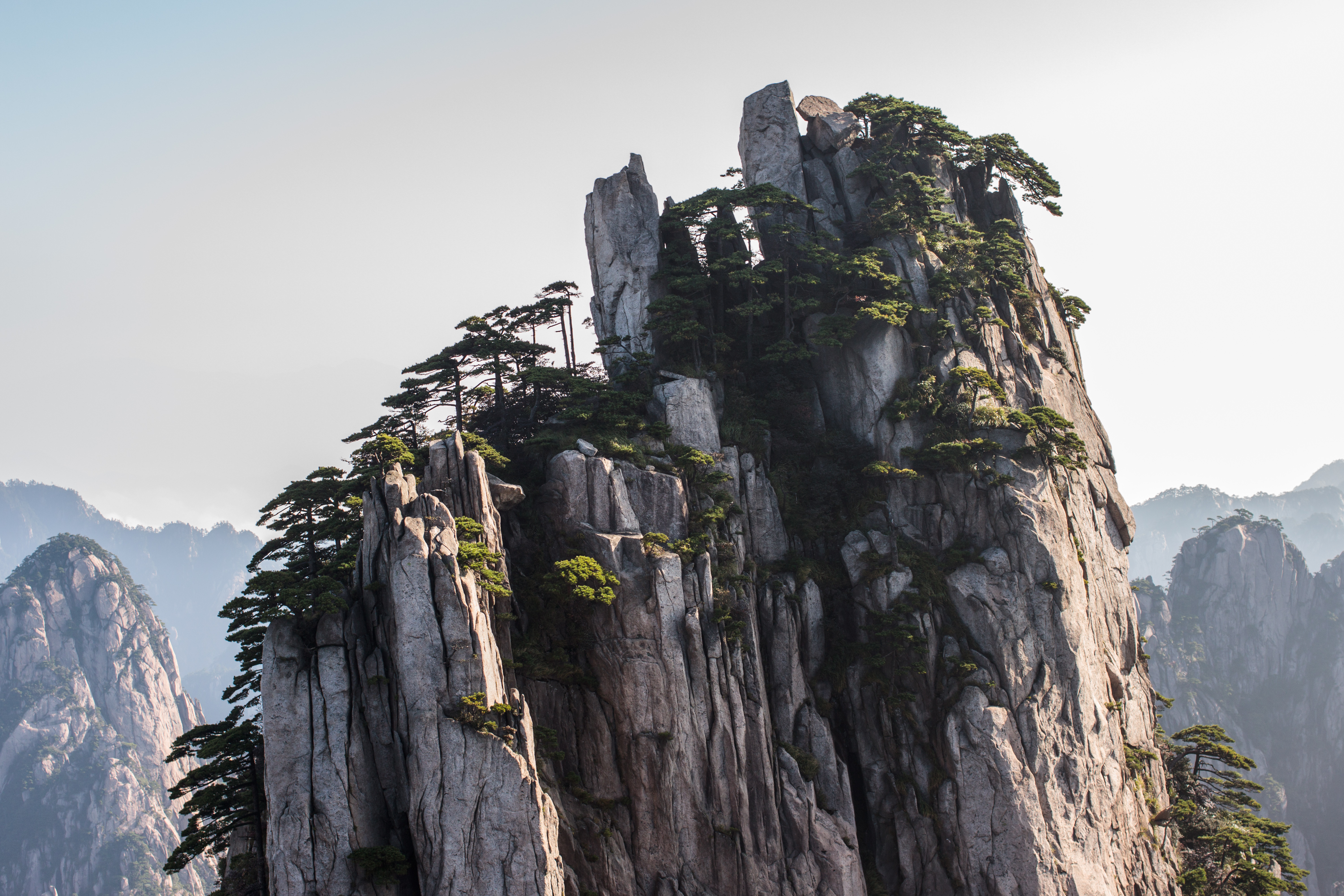
Summit of mountain in Huangshan

== See also ==
- List of World Heritage Sites in China
- List of ultras of Tibet, East Asia and neighbouring areas
- Sacred Mountains of China
- Chinese frigate Huangshan

== Bibliography ==
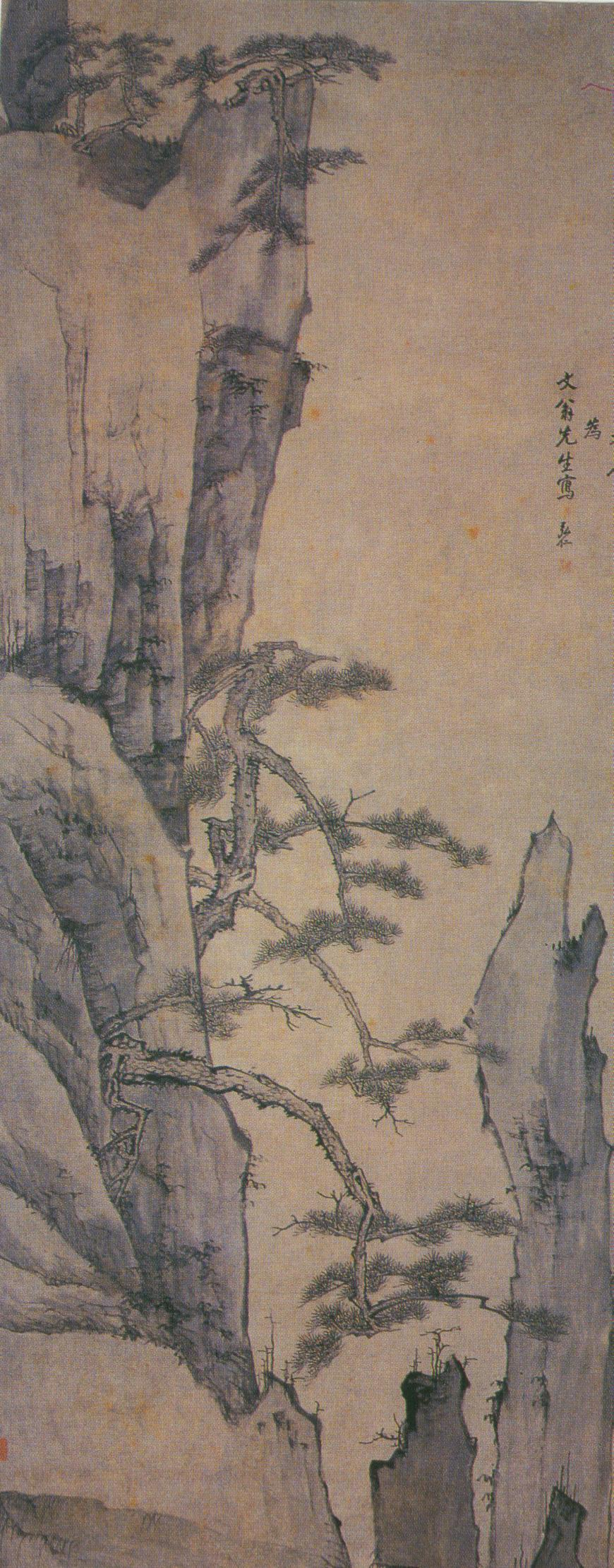
黄海树石 清·渐江

- Bernstein, Ken (1999). China pocket guide. Revised by JD Brown; edited by Richard Wallis. Berlitz Publishing Company. ISBN 2-8315-7049-2.
- Cao Nanyan (2003). China: World Heritage Sites. Beijing: China Architecture and Building Press. ISBN 0-7607-8685-2.
- Guo Changjian; Song Jianzhi (2003). World Heritage Sites in China. 五洲传播出版社 (Wuzhou Publishing House). ISBN 7-5085-0226-4.
- Heiss, Mary Lou; Robert J. Heiss (2007). The Story of Tea. Ten Speed Press. p. 122. ISBN 978-1-58008-745-2. "Huangshan."
- Huangshan Mountains. China Travel and Tourism Press. 1998. ISBN 7-5032-1520-8.
- Ogawa, Hideshi; Akie Yanagi (2006). Wily Monkeys: Social Intelligence of Tibetan Macaques. Trans Pacific Press. ISBN 1-920901-97-3.
