= Victor Bright =

American electrical engineer

Victor Bright from the University of Colorado, Boulder, Colorado was named Fellow of the Institute of Electrical and Electronics Engineers (IEEE) in 2015 for contributions to micro- and nano-electromechanical systems.
