= Bright (given name) =

Bright is a given name. Notable people with the given name include:

Given name

- Bright Addae, Ghanaian footballer
- Bright Allotey, Ghanaian footballer
- Bright Edomwonyi, Nigerian footballer
- Bright Enobakhare, Nigerian footballer
- Bright Esieme, Nigerian footballer
- Bright Gyamfi, Ghanaian footballer
- Bright Igbinadolor, Nigerian footballer
- Bright Matonga, Zimbabwean politician
- Bright Nxumalo, Swazi footballer
- Bright Phiri, Zimbabwean cricketer
- Bright Rwamirama, Ugandan politician
- Bright Samuel, English footballer
- Bright Sheng, Chinese-American composer
- Bright Silas, Nigerian footballer
- Bright Simons, Ghanaian social innovator
- Bright Sodje, English rugby player
- Bright Tetteh Ackwerh, Ghanaian artist
- Bright Williams, New Zealand veteran
- Bright Wireko-Brobby, Ghanaian politician

Middle name

- Edgar Bright Wilson, American chemist
- Edgar Bright Wilson (politician), American politician
- Edward Bright Vedder, American physician
- Georgia Bright Engel, American actress
- Harold Bright Maynard, American engineer
- Helen Bright Clark, British activist
- James Bright Morgan, American politician
- Joan Bright Astley, British military writer
- Joy Bright Hancock, American veteran
- Margaret Bright Lucas, British temperance activist
- Nathaniel Bright Emerson, American physician
- Priscilla Bright McLaren, British activist
- Thomas Bright Crosse, British politician

Nickname

- Bright Vachirawit ("Bright"), Thai actor, singer, model and entrepreneur.

== See also ==
- Bright (surname)
- Bert (name)
