= Octavia Bright =

English writer

- Born: Octavia Hilary Bright; 1986 (age 39–40); Westminster, London, England
- Education: University College London (PhD)
- Years active: 2013–present
- Website: www.octaviabright.com

Octavia Hilary Bright (born 1986) is an English writer and broadcaster. She co-hosted the NTS Radio podcast Literary Friction (2015–2023). Her memoir This Ragged Grace was published in 2023.

== Early life ==
Bright was born in central London. She completed a PhD at University College London (UCL) in the Spanish department.

== Career ==
In November 2013, Bright was invited to co-host the live talk show Literary Friction with agent Carrie Plitt on NTS Radio. In 2015, Literary Friction switched from a radio show to a podcast, still supported by NTS Radio. On the podcast, the duo recommended contemporary novels and interviewed various authors, including Dolly Alderton, Sally Rooney, Ocean Vuong and Deborah Levy. Literary Friction was nominated for Best Culture Podcast at the 2018 British Podcast Awards, while Vogue named it one of the best podcasts of 2021. Garnering over a million downloads since its debut, Literary Friction came to an end in 2023. In addition, Bright recurrently presented episodes of the BBC Radio 4 programme Open Book, ran a blog titled Lobsters for Liberty, and wrote librettos with the likes of Héloïse Werner.

Canongate Books picked up the rights in 2021 to publish Bright's debut book and memoir This Ragged Grace: A Memoir of Recovery and Renewal in 2023. The memoir details Bright's journey with recovery from alcoholism, which she was first told she had at age 27 when she was finishing her PhD, as well as delving into her father's Alzheimer's diagnosis.

== Bibliography ==
- This Ragged Grace: A Memoir of Recovery and Renewal (2023)
