= Janeen Brady =

American composer

- Born: Janeen Jacobs; 1934 (age 91–92)
- Education: Brigham Young University
- Spouse: Ted Brady
- Children: 9

Janeen Jacobs Brady (born 1934) is an American composer, lyricist, and publisher of children's music, patriotic songs, educational music, and religious songs and hymns. She has also authored cantatas, musical comedies, musical dramas, and roadshows. She and her husband, Ted Brady, founded Brite Music, Inc. She has composed and produced over 40 full-length albums and her songs have sold over 6 million copies.

== Biography ==
Born Janeen Jacobs, she was the eldest of Owen S. and Agnes Jacobs' 11 children. She started piano lessons at the age of 4. In the first grade, when the teacher was having a difficult time with a song, Janeen offered to play for her and she ended up being the class accompanist. She performed with her 6 younger sisters as the "Jacobs Sisters" in Idaho, Utah, and California. At age 17, Janeen co-authored and directed her first roadshow. She attended Brigham Young University, where she was active in the Opera Workshop, the Delta Phi Chorus and the Student Program Bureau, and she met her husband, Ted Brady.

Janeen and Ted Brady founded Brite Music, Inc. in 1978. Janeen was the author of numerous Brite Music published children's music and books, including The Safety Kids, Watch Me Sing, I Have a Song For You, and Sing, Read and Write'. She is also the author of the Brite Music published Standin′ Tall books. She has also written children's books such as My Body Machine (ISBN 0-944803-73-3) and The Creation (ISBN 978-1599551395).

Ted and Janeen Brady have nine children.

In 1983, she was invited to the White House by U.S. President Ronald Reagan and Mrs. Reagan for a performance of her song, "The Great American Family".

She wrote Safety Kids music to teach children to stay safe from all kinds of dangers; it was turned into a movie to be used in elementary schools.

Brady's song "I Lived in Heaven" is in the 1989 Children's Songbook of The Church of Jesus Christ of Latter-day Saints.
