= Bright, West Virginia =

Unincorporated community in West Virginia, United States

Bright
- Unincorporated community
- Location within the state of West Virginia Bright (the United States)
- Coordinates: 38°37′33″N 81°14′4″W
- Country: United States
- State: West Virginia
- County: Roane
- Elevation: 787 ft (240 m)
- Time zone: UTC-5 (Eastern (EST))
  - Summer (DST): UTC-4 (EDT)
- GNIS ID: 1740858

Bright is an unincorporated community in Roane County, West Virginia, United States.
