= Mary Bright =

Scottish curtain designer (1954–2002)

- Born: 11 January 1954; Edinburgh, Scotland, United Kingdom
- Died: 29 November 2002 (aged 48); New York City, United States
- Citizenship: United Kingdom
- Occupation: Curtain designer
- Years active: 1979–2002
- Spouse: David Paskin (m. 1990–2002)

Mary Bright (11 January 1954 – 29 November 2002) was a Scottish curtain designer. She began her career doing a short apprenticeship at Paris' Lanvin fashion house. In 1979, Bright relocated to New York City and worked as a hat maker as well as designing clothes. She began designing curtains in her own studio Mary Bright Inc. in 1983, and her clientele included contemporary architects and other well-known celebrities. Bright was also a contributor to exhibition design. She experimented with corrugated paper, rubber and fine metal meshes with cut and sewn linen and wool.

== Biography ==
On 11 January 1954, Bright was born in Edinburgh, Scotland. She was the daughter of a family doctor. Bright learnt fine arts in London and then fashion and millinery in Leeds; despite this, she did not formally train as a designer. Bright did a brief apprenticeship period at Paris' Lanvin fashion house, where she learnt millinery's secrets. At Gelot, she sewed men's hats. In 1979, she relocated to the East Village neighbourhood of New York City, working as a hat maker, learning the production of both garments and sowing. To complement her work, Bright became a clothing designer, completing such projects as a cocktail dress with a revealing back shielded by slats by a window blind.

In 1983, she began working as a curtain designer in her own studio Mary Bright Inc. in lower Broadway, when she designed a 60 ft (18 m) curtain for Ellen Barkin, the actress. According to The Times, Bright "found herself in great demand, often working with New York's leading architects and interior designers." Such clients of hers included Lauren Bacall, Calvin Klein, The Mercer Hotel of New York, Bette Midler, Museum of Modern Art of New York, Rupert Murdoch, Wendi Deng Murdoch and Jean-Georges Vongerichten among other contemporary architects such as Laurie Hawkinson, Henry Smith-Miller, Keenen Riley, Michael Schmitt and Kevin Walz. One of Bright's works, which was a 12 ft (3.7 m)-high, 26 ft (7.9 m)-wide undulating veil of tiny metal coils, was hung in the Museum of Modern Art's restaurant. She was a contributor to exhibition design, such as for Mies in Berlin at the Museum of Modern Art in 2001.

== Personal life ==
She was married to David Paskin from 1990 to 2002. In 2002, Bright was diagnosed with lung cancer, which had metastasised to her brain and body treated with radiation and steroids. On 29 November 2002, she died from lung cancer at NewYork-Presbyterian Hospital.

== Approach and legacy ==
Bright experimented by using the materials corrugated paper, rubber and fine metal meshes, with linen and wool that was cut and sewn on. Using such materials garnered her much attention, and she would spread the fabric on a 30 ft (9.1 m) worktable, before cutting it up with her 8 in (200 mm) shears. Every room of her clients saw Bright apply a different solution of materials, such as blends, buttery wools, shimmering linens, synthetics, and Teflon-coated nylons of which she promoted. She said in 1997: "I try to find other ways besides using fringe and tassels to make curtains look interesting." Bright also used silvery metals in her works starting from 1987, which gradually became fashionable, and included 3 in (76 mm) of silk taffeta lining peering at the centre and bottom in the style of a petticoat to distinguish.

John A. Hoch described her legacy in the January 2003 issue of Metropolitan Home: "As a needle woman, she certainly flourished in her exacting craft in the most inventive and creative sense. And then there was Mary's depth of perception--whether at a showroom, an East Village restaurant or local coffee shop. Mary could assess a group or individual and ignite the situation into fiery brilliance with wit and sparkle, or calm it with that inner serenity of hers." Hoch also referred to Bright as "a larger-than-life individual" and "a unique talent". William L. Johnson of The New York Times wrote of Bright's artistry: "from controlled chaos – a crinkled polyester curtain for a New York apartment that looks alive with the electricity of an approaching storm – to a flatness as tranquil as a flat sea."
