= Bright.com =

- Type: Private
- Industry: Online services, Job search engine
- Founded: San Francisco, California (February 2011)
- Headquarters: 690 5th St, San Francisco, California, United States
- Key people: Steve Goodman (CEO)

Bright.com is a employment website that uses a computer algorithm to match potential employee to advertised positions. Bright Media is the parent company of Bright.com and Bright Labs, a group that provided access to data and resources on the current job market. Bright Media is led by CEO Steve Goodman.

Bright was founded in February 2011. Steve Goodman has held the position of CEO since the company's inception. The site hosted 2.1 million job descriptions.

Bright.com's jobs matching business was acquired by LinkedIn in February 2014 for $120 million (~$161 million in 2025).
