= Tom Bright =

Ugandan politician

Tom Bright Amooti
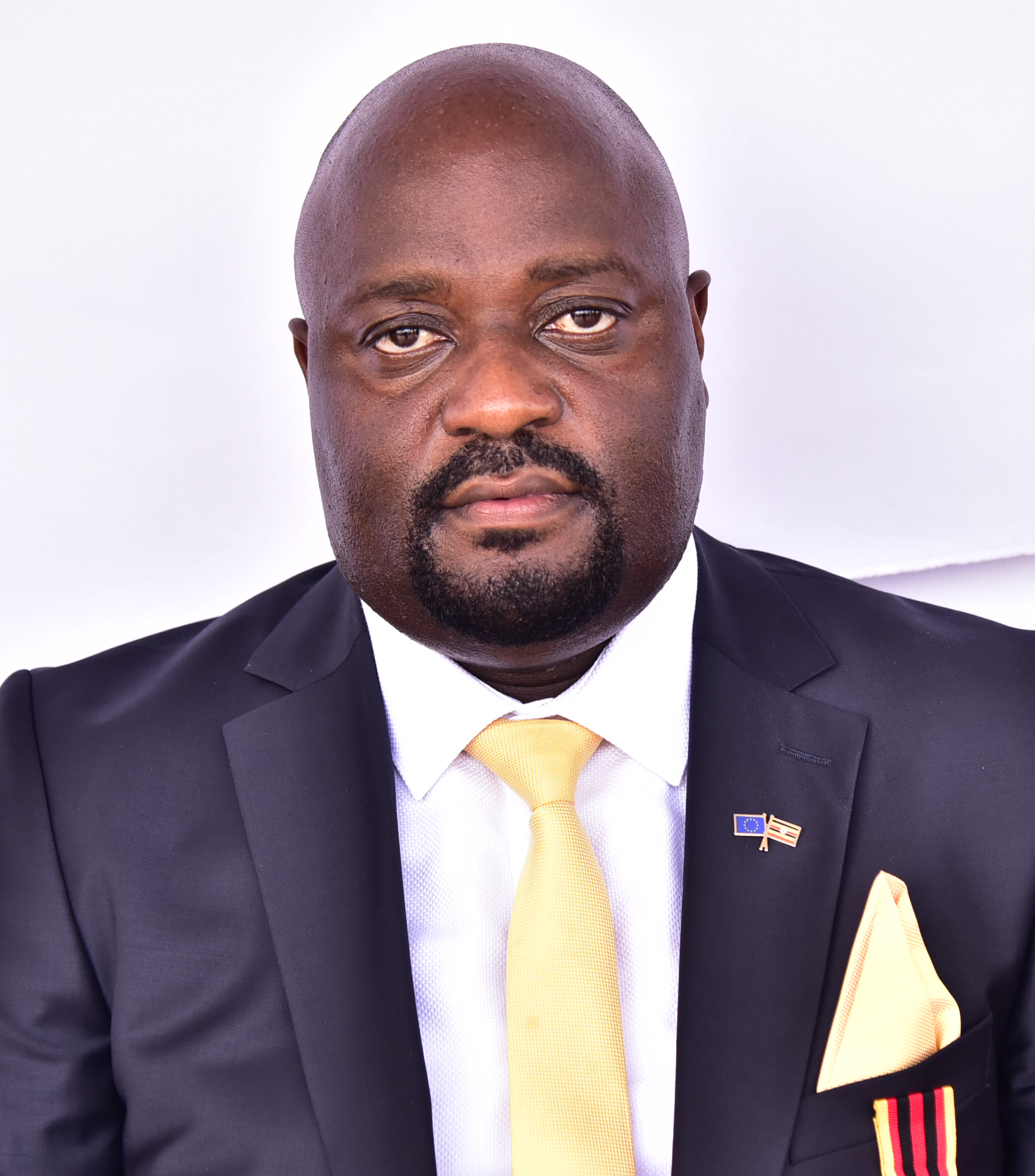
- Tom Bright Amooti in 2021

Member of Parliament (10th and 11th Parliaments)
- Constituency: Kyaka Central, Kyegegwa District

Personal details
- Born: 12 November 1981 (age 44) Uganda
- Party: National Resistance Movement (NRM)
- Profession: Politician, Businessman, Property Mogul

Tom Bright Amooti (born November 12, 1981) is a Ugandan politician from the National Resistance Movement. He is the MP for Kyaka Central constituency in Kyegegwa District. He is a member of the 11th parliament. He also represented the same Constituency in the 10th Parliament. His a member of the National Resistance Movement the ruling political party in Uganda.

== Background and education ==
Tom Bright Amooti was born on November 12, 1981 and as of late 2025, he is 44 years old. Amooti has publicly shared that he was raised by a single mother and supported himself by selling pancakes in his youth. He has recently referred to the loss of an elderly father figure in his life, "mzei Dad of Dr. James," in mid-2024.

While specific school names are often not listed in brief public biographies, he has discussed his education in interviews titled "One on One: Kyaka Central MP Bright Tom Amooti on Kyegegwa Politics, Education and Parliament". Tom Bright Amooti, the Ugandan Member of Parliament for Kyaka Central, attended Lwekishugi Baptist Primary School for his primary education. He later advanced his education by earning a degree from Nkumba University in 2017.

As a Member of Parliament for the 10th and 11th Parliaments, he meets the constitutional educational requirements for the office, which in Uganda typically include a minimum of an Advanced Level certificate (UACE) or its equivalent.

== Career ==
His journey into active politics started in 2016 as he contested for MP Kyaka Constituency the NRM flag bearer. He defeated three other parties with 15,956 votes while his rivals including Birihariiwe Eryeza who came as an independent candidate got 8,983 votes, Mukama Jovan of FDC with 173 and Byekwaso Moses of DP with 132 votes.

In 2021 elections, Tom contested again for the position he was holding in the tenth Parliament (MP Kyaka Central constituency) competing against Birihariiwe Eryeza, Nelson Alali, Barintuma Shaban and John Nyamuhanga. The Electoral Commission declared Tom of the NRM party winner winning with 18,777 votes defeating four other contestants where Elieza Birihariwe got 12,643 votes, Barintuma Shaban with 285 votes, Nelson Alali who scored 155 votes and John Nyamuhanga who managed to score 23 votes.

=== Professional and cultural career ===
- Business: He is known as a "property mogul" in the Tooro region, he is a prominent businessman and the director of Britop Radio. He also owns the Britop Echo Resort in Kyegegwa.
- Tooro Kingdom: Before entering national politics, he served as the Minister of Foreign Affairs and Inter-Kingdom Cooperation for the Tooro Kingdom.
- Chairperson Tooro Province. He is also known as the chairperson of the football team Tooro Province.

== Political status ==
In August 2025, Amooti was declared the official flag bearer for the National Resistance Movement (NRM) for Kyaka Central in the upcoming 2026 general elections. He is an active member of the 11th Parliament (2021–2026) and previously served in the 10th Parliament. He has recently advocated for agricultural support, specifically urging the Ministry of Agriculture to assist farmers with the supply of quality manure.

== Controversies ==
After the vitory of Tom Bright, Elieza filed for petiton in opposition with what was announced by the Election Commission. The Court of Appeal in presence of the Deputy Chief Justice Richard Buteera, Justice Irene Mulyagonja and Justine Catherine Bamugemereire dismissed the appeal on grounds it was filed after seven days which are directed by the law. Birihariwe petitioned the High Court in Fort Portal over complaints on the Bright's nominations and declaration that they were not in line with the election rules. This petition was dismissed in October by Justice Jesse Byaruhanga Rugyema but this forced Elieza to file for another notice of appeal against this decision on 3 November 2021. Elieza also filed the Memorandum of Appeal with a record of proceedings of High Court. All this was done on 22 December 2021 and Bright was served on 17 January 2022.

Bright through his Lawyer with William Kyobe as the lead, filed an application towards Birihairwe's appeal with concern that it was not filed under the directed timeframe of seven days. In his submission, he clearly indicated Eliezah's application did not contain any forms of request for an extension on time and serve the documents with in the stipulated time and so requested for case dismissal. This case was dismissed by the Justices on grounds that Birihairwe failed to provide sufficient reasons for his filing.

== Family ==
He is married to Phiona Hadoto Bright. She is an entrepreneur who was recognized in late 2024 with the Best Woman Entrepreneur Award for the Western Region. While he has mentioned having children, public details are typically kept private to maintain their security.

== See also ==
- List of members of the eleventh Parliament of Uganda
- List of members of the tenth Parliament
- Ngabu William Kwemara
- Rebecca Kadaga
