= Guang Ming Temple =

Buddhist temple in Orlando, Florida, United States

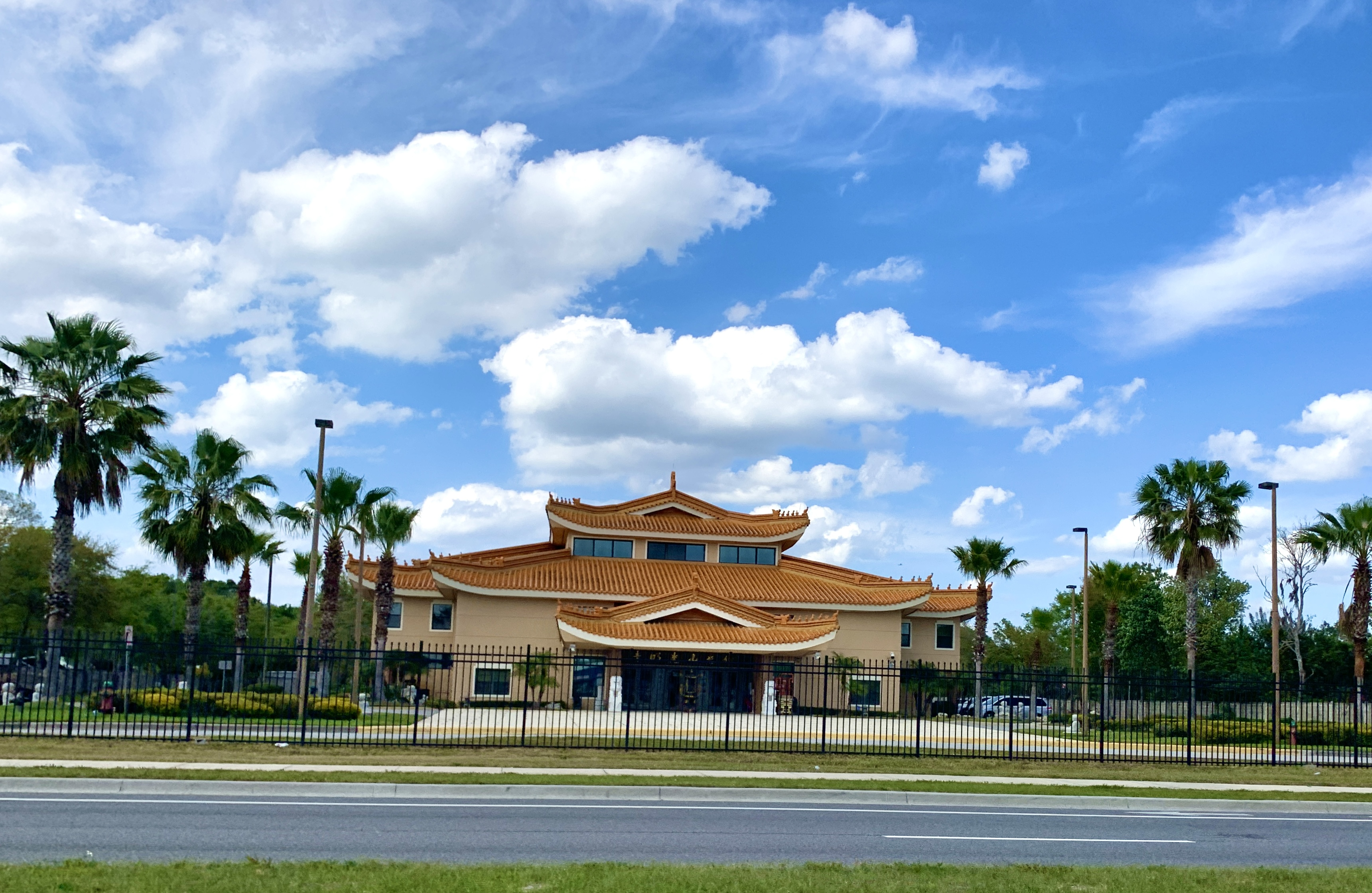

- Location within Florida Location within the United States

Religion
- Affiliation: Buddhism
- Sect: Fo Guang Shan

Location
- Location: 6555 Hoffner Road, Orlando, FL 32822
- Country: United States
- Interactive map of Guang Ming Temple
- Coordinates: 28.4815°N 81.295°W

Architecture
- Founder: Hsing Yun
- Completed: 2007

Website
- www.orlandobuddhism.org/

The Guang Ming temple (Chinese: 光明寺; pinyin: Guāngmíng Sì; Pe̍h-ōe-jī: Kong-bîng-sī; lit. 'Bright Light Temple') in Orlando, Florida, United States is the largest Buddhist temple in Central Florida. The three-story, 30,000-square-foot (2,800 m^{2}), traditional Chinese-monastic style temple was completed in 2007 and cost approximately $5 million to construct. The temple is associated with Fo Guang Shan, a monastic organization from Taiwan led by Venerable Hsing Yun that claims over one million members worldwide, and with Hsi Lai Temple in Los Angeles. Guang Ming is home to several resident monastics, and boasts a vast main shrine room, auxiliary meditation room, vegetarian cafeteria, tea room, gift shop, and guest dormitories. The temple is open daily from 10:30 am to 5:00 pm, and weekly events are held in Chinese as well as English.
