= SS Khalda =

1943 merchant ship

History
- Name: Tiefland (1943-45); Empire Gatehouse (1945-47); Gulfport (1947-64); Stefani (1964-66); Agia Marina (1966-67); Bright (1967-69); Khalda (1969-82)
- Owner: Hamburg Südamerikanische Dampfschifffahrts-Gesellschaft A/S & Co KG (1943-45); Ministry of War Transport (1945-46); Ministry of Transport (1946-47); Gulfport Steamship Co (1947-64); Alma Shipping Co (1964-66); M N Arcadis (1966-67); Bright Shipping Co (1967-69); Khalda Shipping Co (1969-77); A W & Y F Obeid (1977-82)
- Operator: Hamburg Südamerikanische Dampfschifffahrts-Gesellschaft A/S & Co KG (1943-45); Brown, Atkinson & Co (1945-47); Gulfport Steamship Co (1947-64); Alma Shipping Co (1964-66); M N Arcadis (1966-67); Bright Shipping Co (1967-69); Khalda Shipping Co (1969-77); A W & Y F Obeid (1977-82)
- Port of registry: (Nazi Germany) Hamburg, Germany (1944-45); London, United Kingdom (1945-47); Montreal, Canada (1947-64); Monrovia, Liberia (1964-67); Piraeus, Greece (1967-69); Panama (1969-77); Massawa, Ethiopia (1977-82)
- Builder: Lübecker Flenderwerke AG
- Yard number: 344
- Launched: 10 July 1943
- Completed: 26 October 1943
- Out of service: 1974
- Identification: United Kingdom Official Number 180737 (1945-47); Code Letters GSPL (1945-67); Code Letters VYDR (1946-64); Lloyd's Register Number 5137846 ( –1982)
- Fate: Scrapped

General characteristics
- Class & type: Hansa A type Cargo ship
- Tonnage: 1,924 GRT, 936 NRT, 3,400 DWT
- Length: 85.22 m (279 ft 7 in)
- Beam: 13.51 m (44 ft 4 in)
- Draught: 5.59 m (18 ft 4 in)
- Depth: 4.78 m (15 ft 8 in)
- Installed power: Compound steam engine, 1,200IHP
- Propulsion: Single screw propeller
- Speed: 10.5 knots (19.4 km/h)

Khalda was a Hansa A Type cargo ship which was built as Tiefland in 1943 by Lübecker Flenderwerke AG, Lübeck, Germany for Hamburg Südamerikanische Dampfschifffahrts-Gesellschaft A/S & Co K, Hamburg . She was seized as a prize of war in 1945, passing to the British Ministry of War Transport and renamed Empire Gatehouse. She was sold to Canada in 1947 and was renamed Gulfport. She was sold to Liberia in 1964 and was renamed Stefani, then Agia Marina in 1966. She was sold to Greece in 1967 and renamed Bright. Sold in 1969 to Panama and renamed Khalda, she was arrested in 1974. Sold to Ethiopia in 1977, she was scrapped in 1982.

== Description ==
The ship was 85.22 m (279 ft 7 in) long, with a beam of 13.51 m (44 ft 4 in). She had a depth of 4.78 m (15 ft 8 in), and a draught of 5.59 m (18 ft 4 in). She was assessed as 1,924 GRT, 936 NRT, 3,400 DWT.

The ship was propelled by a compound steam engine, which had two cylinders of 42 cm (16 9/16 in) and two cylinders of 90 cm (35 7/16 in) diameter by 90 cm (35 7/16 in) inches stroke. The engine was built by Ottensener Eisenwerke AG, Hamburg. Rated at 1,200IHP, it drove a single screw propeller and could propel the ship at 10.5 knots (19.4 km/h).

== History ==
Tiefland was a Hansa A Type cargo ship built in 1943 as yard number 344 by Lübecker Flenderwerke AG, Lübeck, Germany for Hamburg Südamerikanische Dampfschifffahrts-Gesellschaft A/S & Co K, Hamburg. She was launched on 15 July and completed on 26 October. Her port of registry was Hamburg.

In May 1945, Tiefland was seized as a prize of war at Brunsbüttel. She was passed to the Ministry of War Transport and was renamed Empire Gatehouse. The Code Letters GSPL and United Kingdom Official Number 180737 were allocated. Her port of registry was London and she was operated under the management of Brown, Atkinson & Co. Ltd., Hull.

In 1947, Empire Gatehouse was sold to the Gulfport Steamship Co., Montreal, Canada and was renamed Gulfport. The Code Letters VYDR were allocated. With their introduction in the 1960s, Gulfport was allocated the Lloyd's Register Number 5137846.

In 1964, Gulfport was sold to the Alma Shipping Co., Liberia and was renamed Stefani. She was sold to M N Arcadis, Liberia in 1966 and was renamed Agia Marina. In 1967, Agia Marina was sold to the Bright Shipping Co., Greece and was renamed Bright.

In 1969, Bright was sold to the Khalda Shipping Co., Panama and was renamed Khalda. She ran aground in the Gulf of Suez in December 1970 and was refloated on 1 January 1971. Arrested at Massawa, Ethiopia in 1974, she was sold by Court Order in 1977 to A W & Y F Obeid. Reported to be in a damaged condition at the time of sale, she was scrapped in 1982.
