= Porcelain stone =

Porcelain stone might refer to:

- Petuntse, a material for Chinese porcelain
- China stone, a material for English porcelain
