= Lower Bostraze and Leswidden SSSI =

Biological Site of Special Scientific Interest in Cornwall, England

Lower Bostraze and Leswidden
- Site of Special Scientific Interest
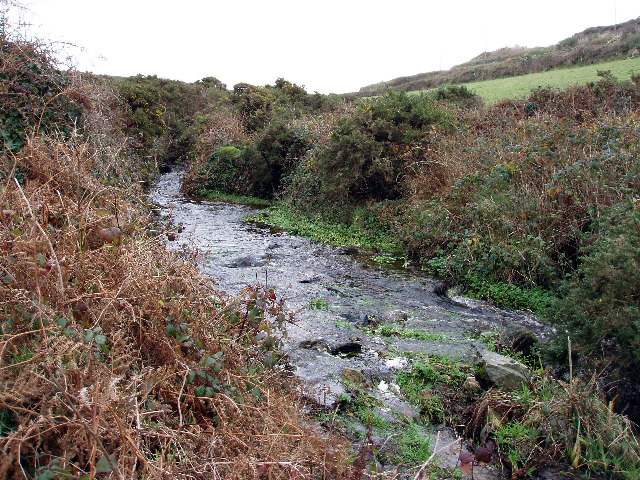
- A stream at Lower Bostraze

- Location within Cornwall Location within England
- Location of Lower Bostraze and Leswidden.
- Area of search: Cornwall
- Grid reference: SW385315
- Coordinates: 50.1262°N 5.6608°W
- Interest: Biological
- Area: 2.3 hectares (0.0230 km^{2}; 0.00888 sq mi)
- Notification date: 1996

Lower Bostraze And Leswidden SSSI is a biological Site of Special Scientific Interest, located on the Penwith Peninsula, Cornwall, England, a little to the east of St Just, approximately 8 km west of Penzance.

== Geography ==
There are two discrete parts of this site – Lower Bostraze China Clay Works and Leswidden Block Works; together they are 23,000 m^{2} in size. Lower Bostraze is located at grid reference SW385315, and Leswidden at grid reference SW390310. The site was notified as an SSSI in 1996. The site lies within the Cornwall Area of Outstanding Natural Beauty and the Penwith Heritage Coast and is partly within the West Penwith Environmentally Sensitive Area. The site has also been designated a Special Area of Conservation.

Both parts of the site are underlain by the Land's End granite, part of the Cornubian batholith. Zones within the granite, altered by kaolinisation, have been extensively worked for china clay until recent years. China clay was discovered in the Balleswidden sett in 1880 and both areas are located within disused china clay workings, consisting of pits, benches, spoil tips and granitic debris with sparse vegetation cover.

== Wildlife and ecology ==
The site's SSSI status is due to the presence of important populations of a very rare liverwort, the Western Rustwort (Marsupella profunda). This species is rare in a British context (it is known from only two other locations in the UK: St Austell Clay Pits and Tregonning Hill, both within Cornwall). However, it is also internationally rare, being known only from Portugal, the Canary Islands, the Azores and Madeira; throughout this range it is a rare species. At Lower Bostraze and Leswidden, Western Rustwort is generally found growing on micaceous or clay waste substrates which are flat or gently sloping. Some patches occur on granitic rocks, usually where these are soft or crumbling. It appears to be a pioneer species, the largest populations being found on surfaces showing the early stages of colonisation by other bryophytes and by vascular plants.

The conservation charity Plantlife designated the St Just Moors, part of this SSSI, an Important Plant Area for the occurrence of Western Rustwort and the green algae desmids.

== History ==
The china clay works at Leswidden started in 1886 or 1887 and were suspended in April, 1887 due to problems with water supply.

== Toponymy ==
The meaning of Bostraze is "dwelling in a flat-bottomed valley". There is a place called Bostrase in the parish of St Hilary (with the same meaning). The meaning of Leswidden is "white / fair ruin".
