= Zhushan =

Zhushan may refer to:

- Zhushan, Nantou (竹山鎮), urban township in Nantou County, Taiwan

== Mainland China ==
- Zhushan County (竹山县), Shiyan, Hubei
- Zhushan District (珠山区), Jingdezhen, Jiangxi
  - Zhushan Subdistrict, Jingdezhen (珠山街道), in the above district
- Zhushan Subdistrict, Jiaonan (珠山街道), Shandong
- Zhushan, Chongqing (竹山镇), town in Liangping County
- Zhushan, Xuan'en County (珠山镇), town in Hubei
- Zhushan, Hunan (珠山镇), town in Lingling District, Yongzhou
- Zhushan, Xinyu (珠珊镇), town in Yushui District, Xinyu, Jiangxi
