= Yaoli =

Yaoli, Yao Li, or variations thereof, may refer to:

- Yaoli, Anhui (姚李镇), a town in Huoqiu County, Anhui Province, China
- Yaoli, Jiangxi (瑶里镇), a town in Fuliang County, Jiangxi Province, China
- Yao Lee (姚莉; 1921–2019), also Yao Li, Chinese singer
- Yao Li (要離), 6th century BC Chinese assassin

== See also ==
- Li Yao (born 1992), Chinese handball player
