= Marsupella arctica =

Scientific classification
- Kingdom: Plantae
- Division: Marchantiophyta
- Class: Jungermanniopsida
- Order: Jungermanniales
- Family: Gymnomitriaceae
- Genus: Marsupella
- Species: M. arctica

Binomial name
- Marsupella arctica (Berggr.) Bryhn & Kaal.

Species of liverwort

Marsupella arctica, commonly known as Arctic rustwort, is a species of liverwort found in the Northern Hemisphere. It is present in Alaska and Greenland and has a European distribution confined to Scotland and Svalbard. The Scottish population was first discovered in 1989 and is restricted to two sites in the Cairngorm mountains - the Lairig Ghru and Beinn a' Bhùird.

The species occupies montane and alpine habitats, and in Britain is classified as a "Vulnerable".
