= Nardia huerlimannii =

Conservation status
- Vulnerable (IUCN 2.3)

Scientific classification
- Kingdom: Plantae
- Division: Marchantiophyta
- Class: Jungermanniopsida
- Order: Jungermanniales
- Family: Gymnomitriaceae
- Genus: Nardia
- Species: N. huerlimannii

Binomial name
- Nardia huerlimannii Grolle & Vána

Species of liverwort

Nardia huerlimannii is a species of liverwort in the family Gymnomitriaceae. It is endemic to New Caledonia. Its natural habitat is subtropical or tropical dry forests.
