= St Austell Clay Pits =

Protected area in Cornwall, England

- Site of Special Scientific Interest
- Location within Cornwall Location within England
- Location of St Austell Clay Pits.
- Area of search: Cornwall
- Grid reference: SW996587
- Coordinates: 50.3935°N 4.8201°W
- Interest: Biological
- Area: 0.6 hectares (0.006 km^{2}; 0.002 sq mi)
- Notification date: 2000

St Austell Clay Pits, (Cornwall, England, UK,) are a group of locations within active china clay quarries that form a single Site of Special Scientific Interest (SSSI) and Special Area of Conservation, noted for its biological characteristics. In particular, the site is known for the rare western rustwort, a plant that grows only at two other sites in the UK.

== Geography ==
The 0.6-hectare (1.5-acre) SSSI, notified in 2000, comprises three separate sites that are all about 4 miles (6.4 km) north of the town of St Austell. They all lie within china clay workings which are still active and are situated on either pits, spoil tips or vegetation-covered granitic debris. The combined site is also designated a Special Areas of Conservation (SAC).

== Wildlife and ecology ==
The SSSI owes its importance to a rare liverwort, the western rustwort (Marsupella profunda), which in the UK can be found only at this site and at two others: Lower Bostraze and Leswidden and Tregonning Hill SSSIs, both within Cornwall, to the west. It is mostly found growing in moist conditions on micaceous or clay waste substrates with no or little sloping, as well as on soft or crumbling granite rocks.

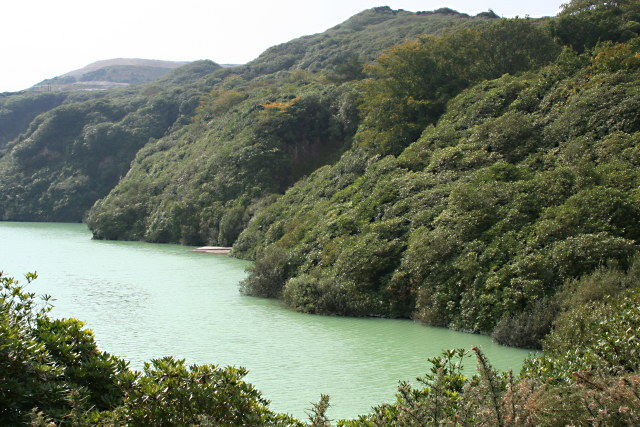
Lansalon Pit, within St Austell Clay Pits Important Plant Area

Owing to the presence of the rare western rustwort, Plantlife has designated a large area of active and disused mine workings in the St Austell area as an Important Plant Area, with the same name as the SSSI. This area includes all the SSSI sites, as well as many others. It is thought that the protected areas will act as a source for colonisation for the western rustwort to other locations in the surrounding china clay area.

== See also ==
- St Austell and Clay Country Eco-town
