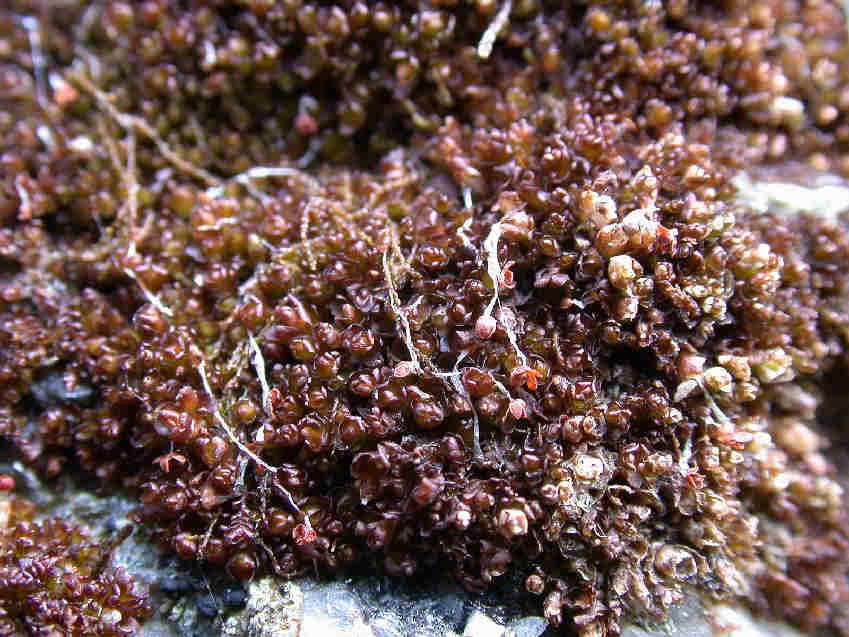

Conservation status
- Vulnerable (IUCN 3.1)

Scientific classification
- Kingdom: Plantae
- Division: Marchantiophyta
- Class: Jungermanniopsida
- Order: Jungermanniales
- Family: Gymnomitriaceae
- Genus: Marsupella
- Species: M. profunda

Binomial name
- Marsupella profunda Lindb.

= Marsupella profunda =

Species of liverwort

Marsupella profunda, the western rustwort, is a liverwort native to Europe and known only from Portugal (Mainland, Azores and Madeira) and Great Britain (Cornwall) and has been sighted in the Canary Islands. It is a small reddish liverwort and can be confused with Marsupella sprucei which has a more widespread distribution.

== Distribution and habitat ==
Marsupella profunda is a saxicolous plant, commonly found on open but shady sites, in wet rock crevices or on slopes. It has a very disjunct population, from Santa Maria Island and Madeira Island in Macaronesia to mountainous areas in Continental Portugal, to Cornwall in England. The species was also sighted in La Palma on the Canary Islands though its presence on the archipelago is not confirmed.

Less than 1000 individuals are known, occupying an area of about 208 square kilometres (80 sq mi) from 100 to 1,200 metres (330 to 3,940 ft) in altitude.

In Portugal the species is mainly reported from the Peneda-Gerês National Park, the Serra da Estrela Natural Park, the Serra de São Mamede Natural Park, the Alvão/Marão ranges and, to some degree, the Monchique Range.

The species is rare in Britain; it is known from just ten locations, all in Cornwall. These sites at Lower Bostraze and Leswidden, St Austell Clay Pits and Tregonning Hill, are all protected as Sites of Special Scientific Interest.

Within Cornwall, western rustwort is generally found growing on micaceous or clay waste substrates which are flat or gently sloping. Some patches occur on granitic rocks, usually where these are soft or crumbling. It appears to be a pioneer species, the largest populations being found on surfaces showing the early stages of colonisation by other bryophytes and by vascular plants. New plants develop and grow rapidly from spores, while older plants disappear as they are shaded out by surrounding vegetation. It disappeared from at least six Cornish sites between 1971 and 2005 due to shading from European gorse (Ulex europaeus) and bramble (Rubus fruticosus agg.)

== Conservation ==
This liverwort is rare in all parts of its range and is known from only a few sites in each locality where it is present. The species has several conservation designations. It is listed on Schedule 8 of the Wildlife and Countryside Act 1981, in Appendix 1 of the Bern Convention, and as a 'priority species' in Annex II of the European Community Habitats and Species Directive (1992).

Annex II means areas in which it occurs can be declared Special Areas of Conservation, if these areas belong to one of the number of habitats listed in Annex I of the directive.
