= Jingdezhen =

Jingdezhen 景德镇市 Kingtechen; Kingtehchen; Chingtechen
- Prefecture-level city
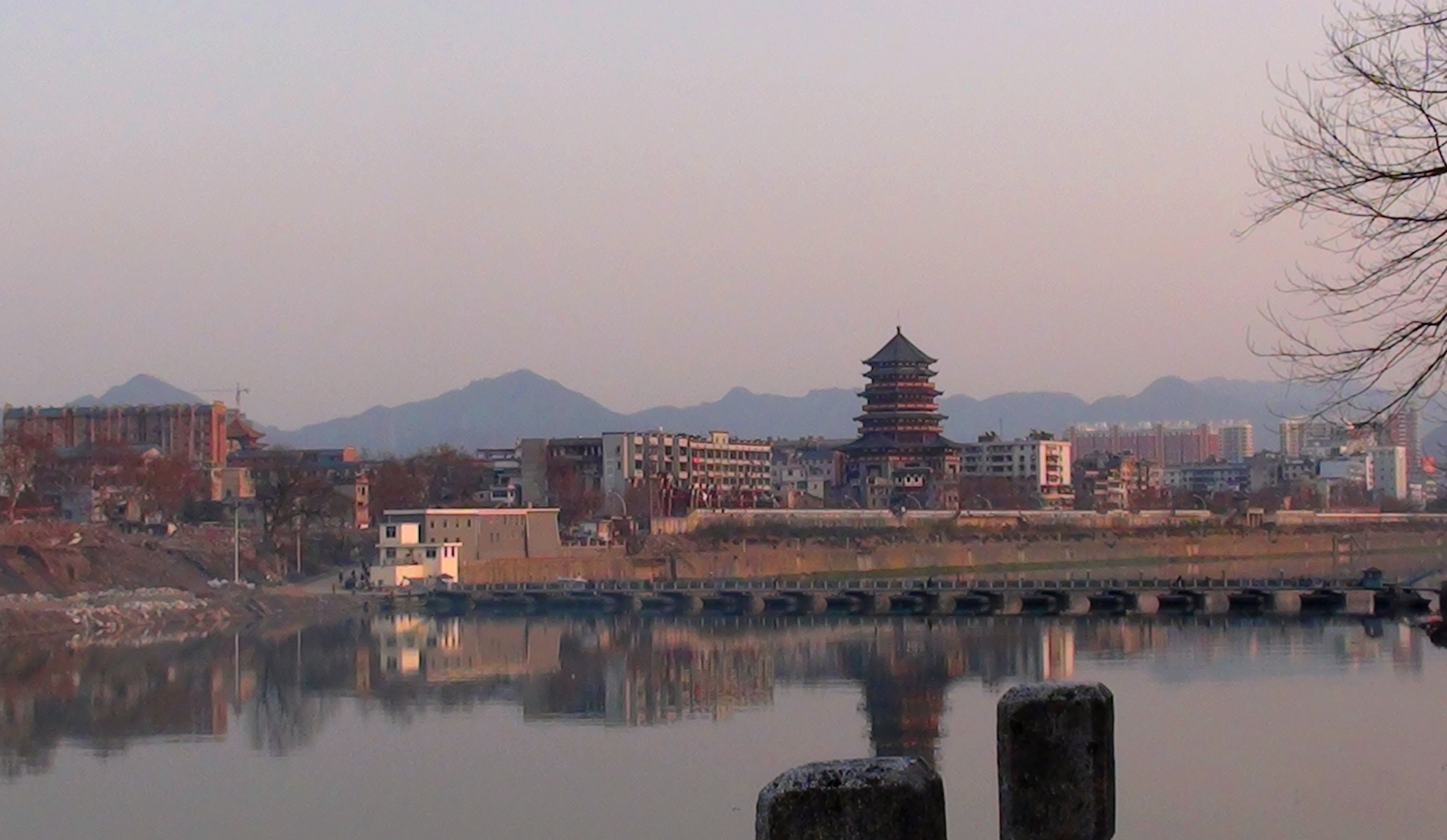
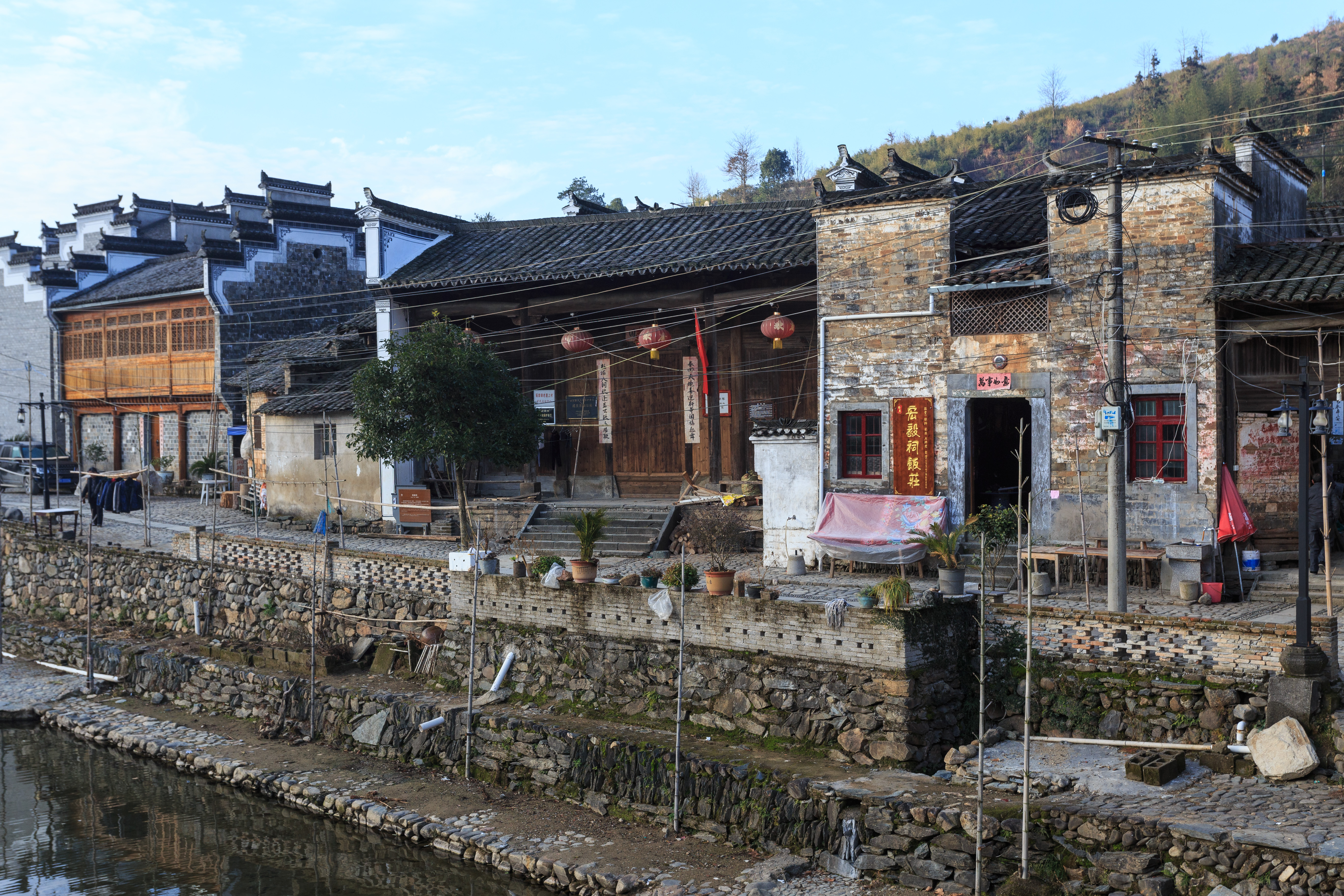
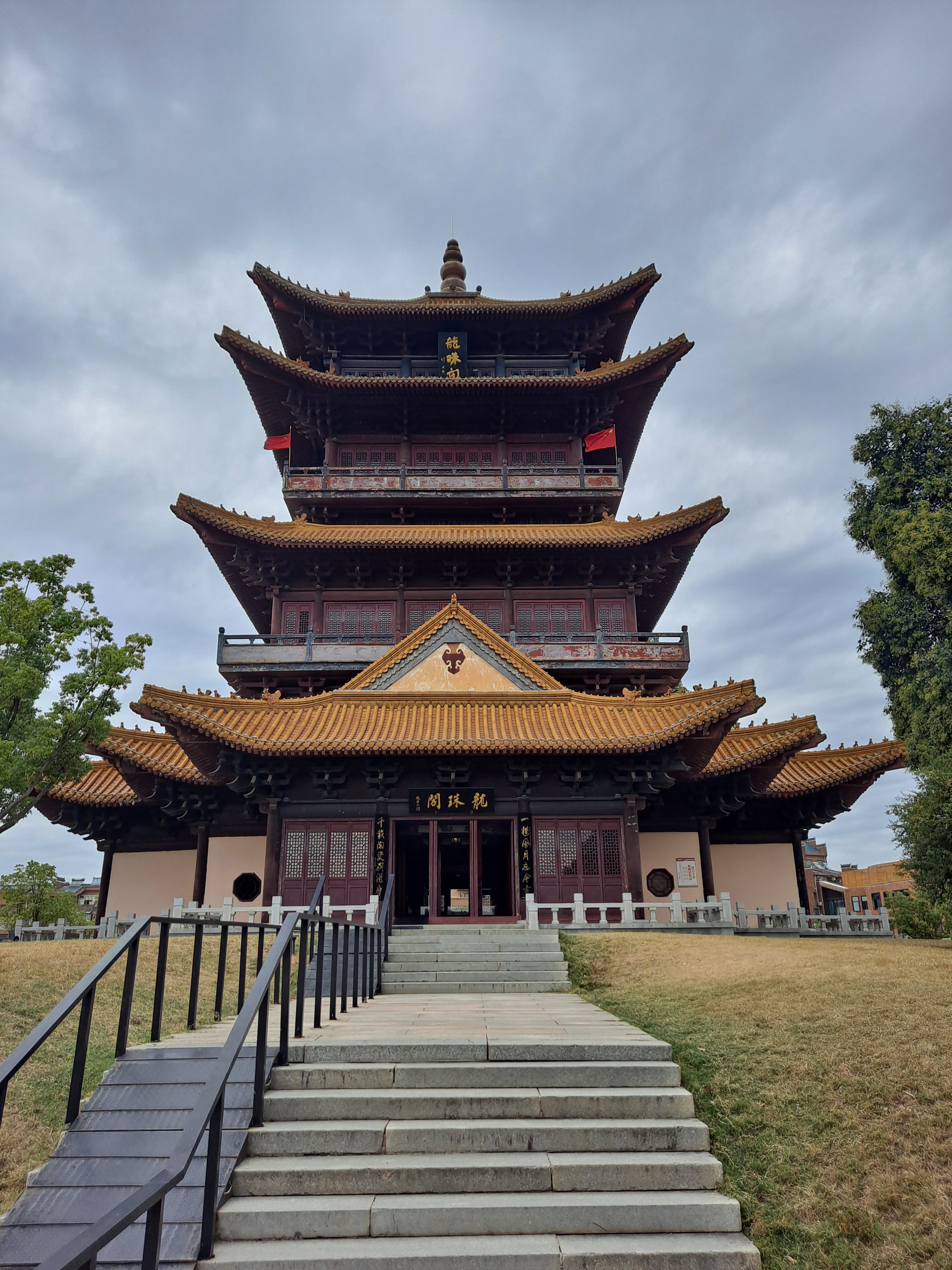
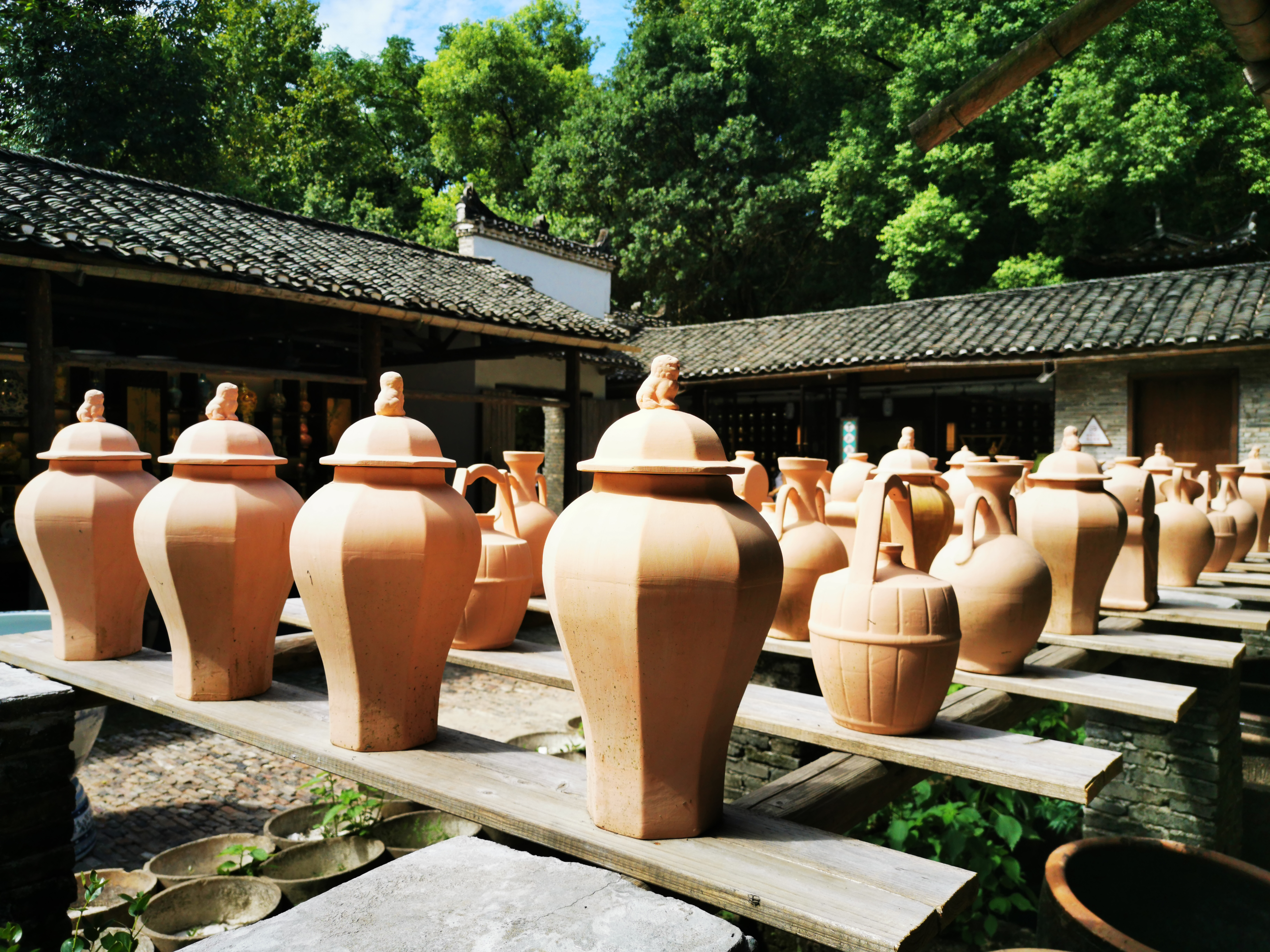
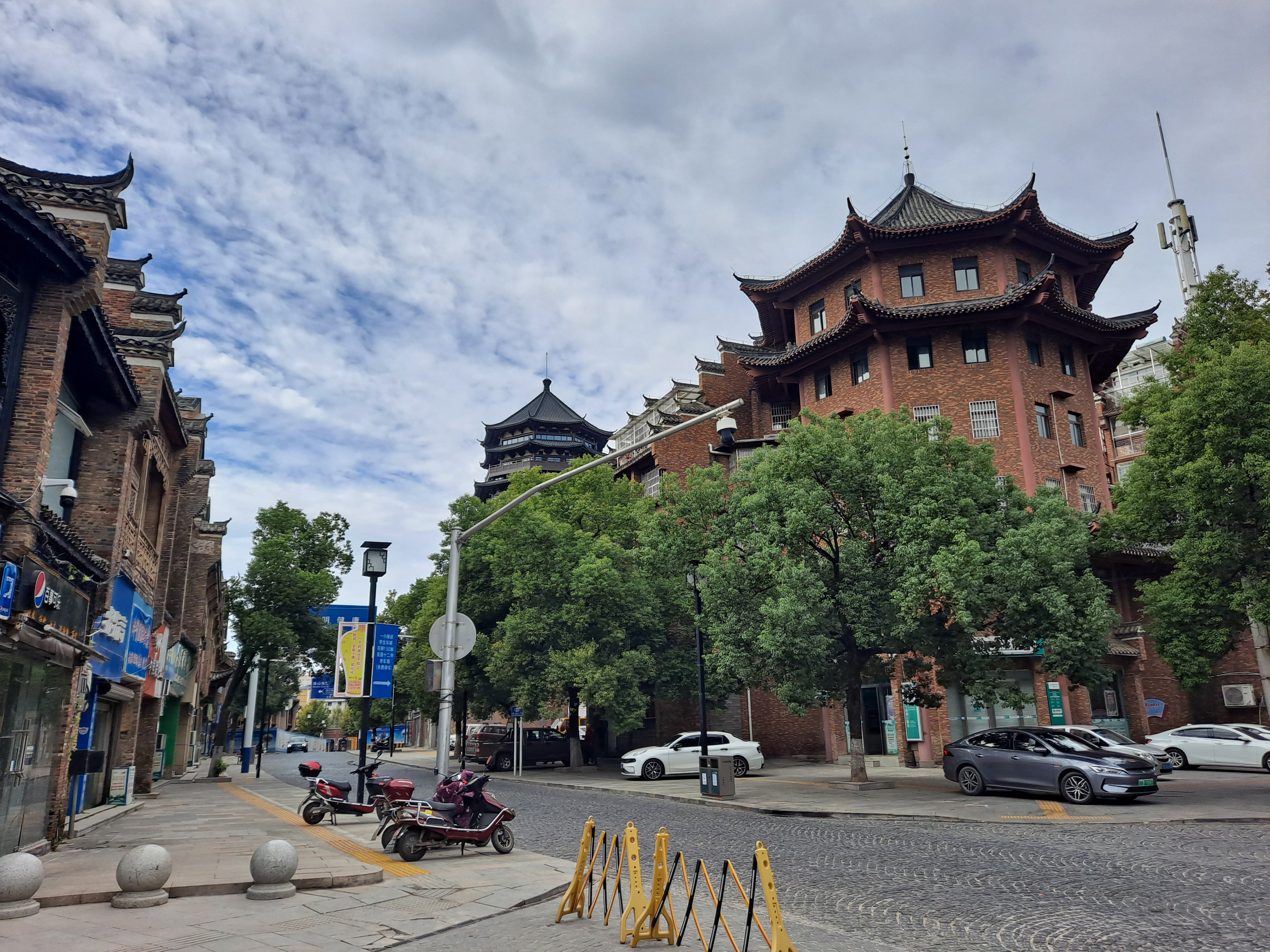
- Skyline of Jingdezhen Yaoli Ancient Town Longzhu Pavilion Ancient Kiln Folk Customs Museum Dou Fu Nong

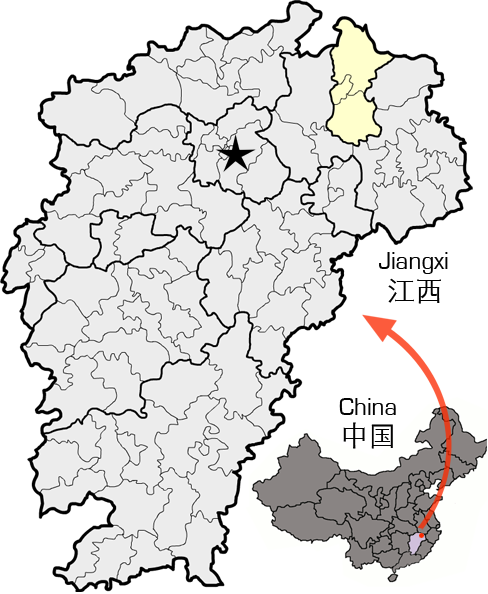
- Location of Jingdezhen City jurisdiction in Jiangxi
- Coordinates (Jingdezhen NPC): 29°17′30″N 117°11′55″E
- Country: People's Republic of China
- Province: Jiangxi
- Municipal seat: Changjiang District

Government
  - CPC Party Secretary: Hu Xuemei
  - Mayor: Chen Kelong; Acting

Area
  - Total: 5,256 km^{2} (2,029 sq mi)
- Elevation: 35 m (115 ft)

Population (2018)
  - Total: 1,669,057
  - Density: 317.6/km^{2} (822.5/sq mi)

GDP
  - Total: CN¥ 77.2 billion US$ 12.4 billion
  - Per capita: CN¥ 47,217; US$ 7,581
- Time zone: UTC+8 (China Standard)
- Postal code: 333000
- Area code: 0798
- ISO 3166 code: CN-JX-02
- Licence plate prefixes: 赣H
- Administrative division code: 360200
- Website: www.jdz.gov.cn

UNESCO World Heritage Site
- Official name: Jingdezhen Handicraft Porcelain Industry Sites
- Criteria: Cultural: ii, iii, iv, vi
- Reference: 1765
- Inscription: 2026 (48th Session)

Jingdezhen
- "Jingdezhen" in Simplified (top) and Traditional (bottom) Chinese characters
- Simplified Chinese: 景德镇
- Traditional Chinese: 景德鎮
- Postal: Fowliang
Transcriptions
Standard Mandarin
- Hanyu Pinyin: Jǐngdézhèn
- Wade–Giles: Ching^{3}-te^{2}-chen^{4}
- IPA: [tɕìŋ.tɤ̌.ʈʂə̂n]
Yue: Cantonese
- Yale Romanization: Gíng-dāk-jan
- Jyutping: Ging^{2}-dak^{1}-zan^{3}
Southern Min
- Hokkien POJ: Kíng-tik-tìn

Jingdezhen is a prefecture-level city in eastern Jiangxi province with a total population of 1,669,057 (2018), bordering Anhui to the north. It is known as the "Porcelain Capital" because it has been producing Chinese ceramics for at least 1,000 years, and for much of that period Jingdezhen porcelain was the most important and finest quality in China. The city has a well-documented history that stretches back over 2,000 years.

== History ==
Throughout both the Spring and Autumn period and the Warring States period, the area of present-day Jingdezhen belonged to the Chu State. After the fall of the Chu, the area was incorporated into the Qin dynasty as part of Fan County (番县) in Jiujiang Commandery. Under the Han dynasty, the area belonged to Poyang County (鄱阳县) in Yuzhang Commandery. Under the Han dynasty, the particular area of future Jingdezhen was known as Xinping (新平). Historical records show that it was during this time that it began to make porcelain.

The town was established during the Jin dynasty under the name Changnan (昌南), due to its location on the south bank of the Chang river. The town's name would be changed twice, first in 742 CE to Fuliang (浮梁), and then in 1004 to Jingdezhen, its current name, after the era name of the Emperor Zhenzong of Song during whose reign its porcelain production first rose to fame. The town was placed under the jurisdiction of Fuliang County.

In the Ming and Qing dynasties, Jingdezhen was considered one of China's four great towns in terms of commercial and industrial importance. The others were Foshan in Guangdong, Hankou in Hubei, and Zhuxian in Henan.

In 1855 during the Taiping Rebellion, Taiping forces destroyed all 9,000 kilns in Jingdezhen. They would be rebuilt after the war in 1866.

In the 19th century, Jingdezhen became a county.

On April 29, 1949, Communist forces took the city.

On May 4, 1949, it was upgraded to a prefecture city. However, to honor its history, Jingdezhen retained it the word zhen meaning town in its name. Usually when a town is upgraded to a city, the designation of shi meaning city replaces that of zhen.

In June 1953, Jingdezhen was upgraded into a provincial level city.

In 1960, Fuliang County was merged into the city.

Jingdezhen was named one of top 24 national historical and cultural cities of the People's Republic of China on February 28, 1982.

In July 1983, Leping County was also merged into the city. In October 1988, Fuliang County was re-established, and in September 1992, Leping County was re-established as a county-level city.

In 2004, Jingdezhen celebrated both 1000 years as an imperial kiln production center and its naming as Jingdezhen. The name switch from Changnan to Jingdezhen marked an important turning point. It recognized the city's leading ceramics industry, which subsequently led to more attention from the Emperor and the development of Jingdezhen's nickname as the "Porcelain Capital."

Due to the relatively low cost of living and heritage of the porcelain industry, Jingdezhen has become a haven for young artists from all over China, who are often referred to known as Jingpiao (景漂).

In 2026, UNESCO designated the porcelain industry sites in and around Jingdezhen as a World Heritage Site.

== Geography ==
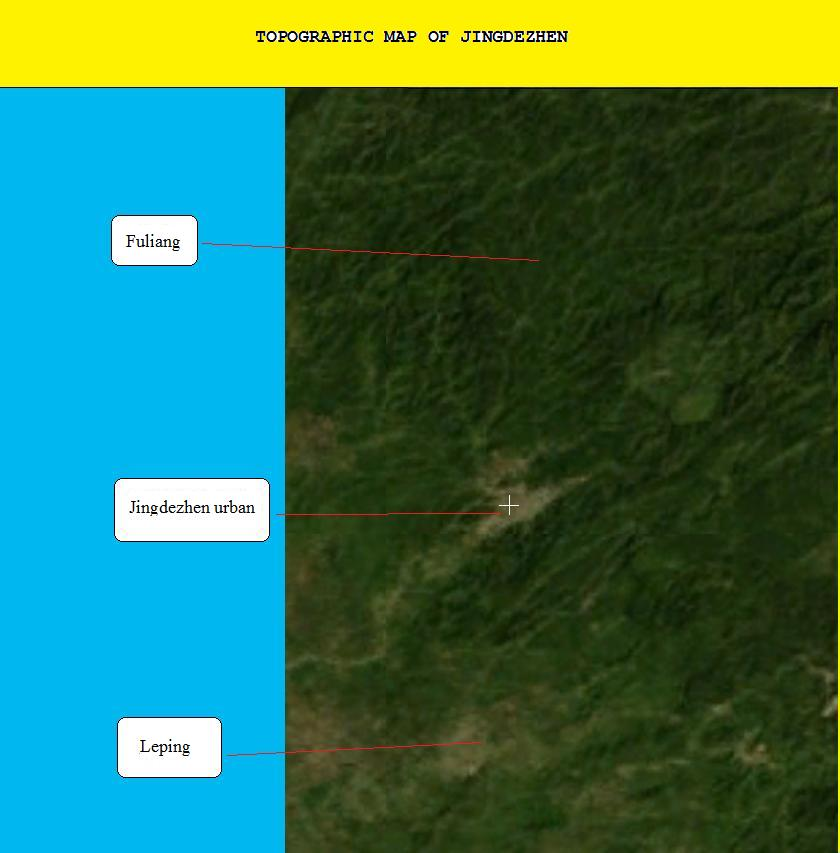
Topographic Map of Jingdezhen

Jingdezhen is situated in the north-east of Jiangxi and borders on Anhui; the city center area is located in the north-east of the Poyang Lake Plain. Its area is 5,256 km^{2} (2,029 sq mi). The highest point is 1,618 m (5,308 ft), with plains on the southern part having an average altitude of 200 m (660 ft).

There are some cities and counties between Jiangxi and Anhui Province around Jingdezhen. To its north, northwest and northeast are Dongzhi, Xiuning, and Qimen County of Anhui province. To its south are Wannian County and Yiyang County. To its west is Boyang County. Lastly, to its southeast are Wuyuan County and Dexing City.

The prefecture's natural resources include kaolin, coal, manganese, and lime. Although various forms of kaolin has since been found around the world, it was the Jingdezhen kilns who first perfected its use in combination with petuntse to create world-class hard-paste porcelain. The name "kaolin" itself derives from the French Jesuit d'Entrecolles's transcription of the local term gāolǐngtǔ (高嶺土), taken from Gaoling (高嶺, Gāolǐng), a village in Ehu Town in Fuliang County that provided most of the city's kaolin during the early and mid-Qing dynasty.

== Climate ==
Jingdezhen has a humid subtropical climate (Köppen Cfa) affected by the East Asian monsoon, with long, humid, very hot summers and cool and drier winters with occasional cold snaps. The monthly 24-hour average temperature ranges from 5.6 °C (42.1 °F) in January to 29.1 °C (84.4 °F) in July, with an annual average of 17.81 °C (64.1 °F). The average annual precipitation is 1,805 mm (71.1 in). With monthly percent possible sunshine ranging from 25% in March to 56% in August, the city receives 1,798 hours of bright sunshine annually. Winter begins somewhat sunny and dry but becomes progressively wetter and cloudier; spring begins especially gloomy, and from March to July each of the months averages more than 190 mm (7.5 in) of rainfall. Summer is the sunniest season here, while autumn remains warm to mild and relatively dry. Extreme maximum temperatures of above 40 °C (104 °F) have been recorded, as have extreme minimums below −10 °C (14 °F).

Climate data for Jingdezhen, elevation 62 m (203 ft), (1991–2020 normals, extremes 1952–present)
Month	Jan	Feb	Mar	Apr	May	Jun	Jul	Aug	Sep	Oct	Nov	Dec	Year
Record high °C (°F)	27.2 (81.0)	28.8 (83.8)	34.0 (93.2)	35.0 (95.0)	36.3 (97.3)	37.9 (100.2)	40.5 (104.9)	41.8 (107.2)	39.7 (103.5)	38.2 (100.8)	32.3 (90.1)	26.3 (79.3)	41.8 (107.2)
Mean daily maximum °C (°F)	10.4 (50.7)	13.5 (56.3)	17.4 (63.3)	23.7 (74.7)	28.0 (82.4)	30.2 (86.4)	33.9 (93.0)	33.9 (93.0)	30.7 (87.3)	25.7 (78.3)	19.5 (67.1)	13.2 (55.8)	23.3 (74.0)
Daily mean °C (°F)	6.0 (42.8)	8.5 (47.3)	12.3 (54.1)	18.2 (64.8)	22.9 (73.2)	25.9 (78.6)	29.3 (84.7)	28.9 (84.0)	25.4 (77.7)	20.0 (68.0)	13.9 (57.0)	8.0 (46.4)	18.3 (64.9)
Mean daily minimum °C (°F)	3.0 (37.4)	5.1 (41.2)	8.7 (47.7)	14.1 (57.4)	18.9 (66.0)	22.6 (72.7)	25.6 (78.1)	25.2 (77.4)	21.6 (70.9)	16.0 (60.8)	10.0 (50.0)	4.5 (40.1)	14.6 (58.3)
Record low °C (°F)	−10.9 (12.4)	−9.2 (15.4)	−4.5 (23.9)	0.2 (32.4)	6.2 (43.2)	13.8 (56.8)	18.4 (65.1)	16.8 (62.2)	8.9 (48.0)	0.0 (32.0)	−7.2 (19.0)	−9.6 (14.7)	−10.9 (12.4)
Average precipitation mm (inches)	95.7 (3.77)	116.6 (4.59)	194.3 (7.65)	229.2 (9.02)	243.2 (9.57)	353.4 (13.91)	241.2 (9.50)	160.0 (6.30)	59.3 (2.33)	56.0 (2.20)	78.9 (3.11)	58.7 (2.31)	1,886.5 (74.26)
Average precipitation days (≥ 0.1 mm)	13.4	13.4	17.0	15.9	15.2	16.7	12.1	10.9	7.2	6.9	9.5	9.6	147.8
Average snowy days	2.4	1.4	0.3	0	0	0	0	0	0	0	0.1	0.9	5.1
Average relative humidity (%)	77	76	77	76	76	80	75	75	73	71	75	74	75
Mean monthly sunshine hours	89.5	90.4	102.8	127.7	150.1	124.6	208.0	205.8	177.0	169.1	136.3	126.8	1,708.1
Percentage possible sunshine	27	29	28	33	36	30	49	51	48	48	43	40	39
Source: China Meteorological AdministrationNOAA

== Administrative divisions ==
The city of Jingdezhen is divided into 4 county-level divisions: Zhushan District, Changjiang District, Fuliang County, and the county-level city of Leping. These 4 county-level divisions administer 52 township-level divisions, and 687 village-level divisions.

County-level divisions of Jingdezhen
English name	Hanzi	Division Type	Population (2007)
Zhushan District	珠山区	District	279,357
Changjiang District	昌江区	District	170,229
Fuliang County	浮梁县	County	280,029
Leping City	乐平市	County-level city	832,142

Map
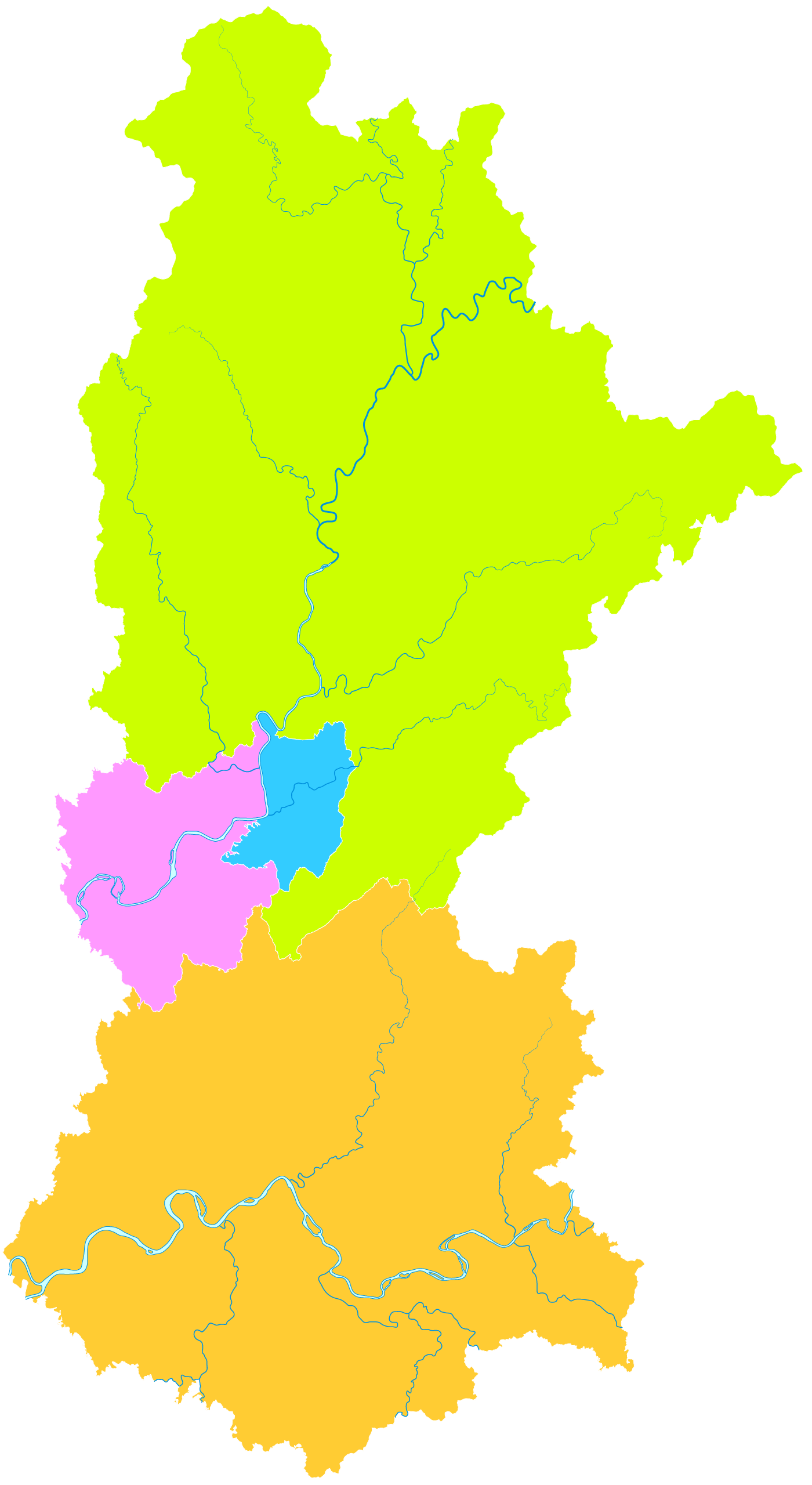

== Porcelain ==
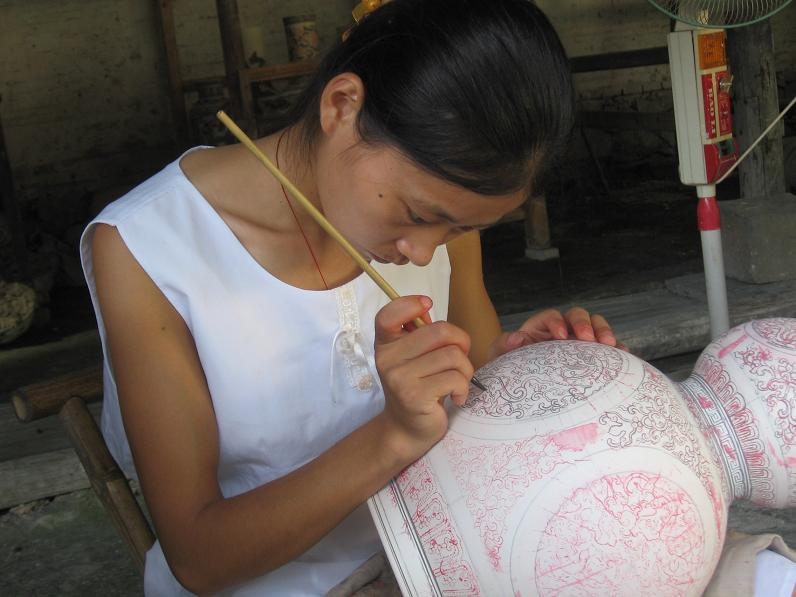
Porcelain workshop in Jingdezhen

Jingdezhen may have produced pottery as early as the sixth century CE, though it is named after the reign name of Emperor Zhenzong, in whose reign it became a major kiln site, around 1004. By the 14th century it had become the largest centre of production of Chinese porcelain, which it has remained, increasing its dominance in subsequent centuries. For several centuries, almost all top quality Chinese porcelain has come from the town. From the Ming period onwards, official kilns in Jingdezhen were controlled by the emperor, making "imperial porcelain" in large quantity for the court and the emperor to give as gifts.

Although apparently an unpromising location for potteries, being a remote town in a hilly region, Jingdezhen is close to the best quality deposits of petuntse, more contemporarily called pottery stone, in China, as well as being surrounded by forests, mostly of pine, providing wood for the kilns. It also has a river leading to river systems flowing north and south, facilitating transport of fragile wares. The imperial kilns were in the centre of the city at Zhushan (Pearl Hill), with many other kilns four kilometres away at Hutian.

It has produced a great variety of pottery and porcelain, for the Chinese market and as Chinese export porcelain, but its best-known high quality porcelain wares have been successively Qingbai ware in the Song and Yuan dynasties, blue and white porcelain from the 1330s, and the "famille rose" and other "famille" colours under the Qing dynasty. The town continues to produce cheaper tablewares in great quantity, as well as more expensive decorative pieces. During the Cultural Revolution, Jingdezhen produced a large number of porcelain Mao badges and statues of a seated Mao Zedong.

Jingdezhen porcelain has fetched record prices at auctions, with a blue and white porcelain jar produced during the Yuan dynasty auctioning for $27.7 million in London in 2005, and a porcelain cup produced during the Ming dynasty auctioning for $36.3 million in 2014.

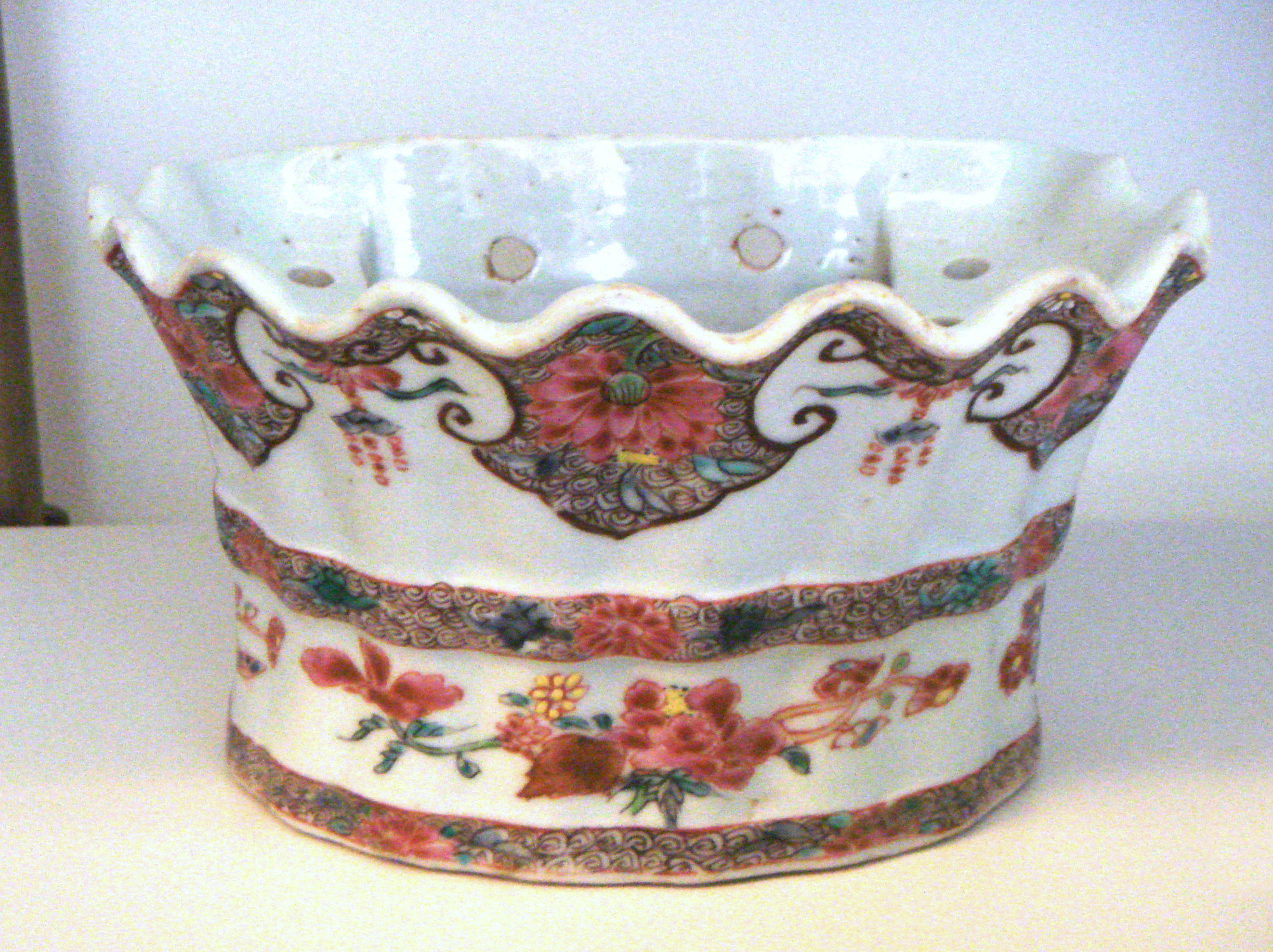
Jingdezhen soft paste porcelain flower holder, "Famille Rose", 1736–1796, Qianlong period

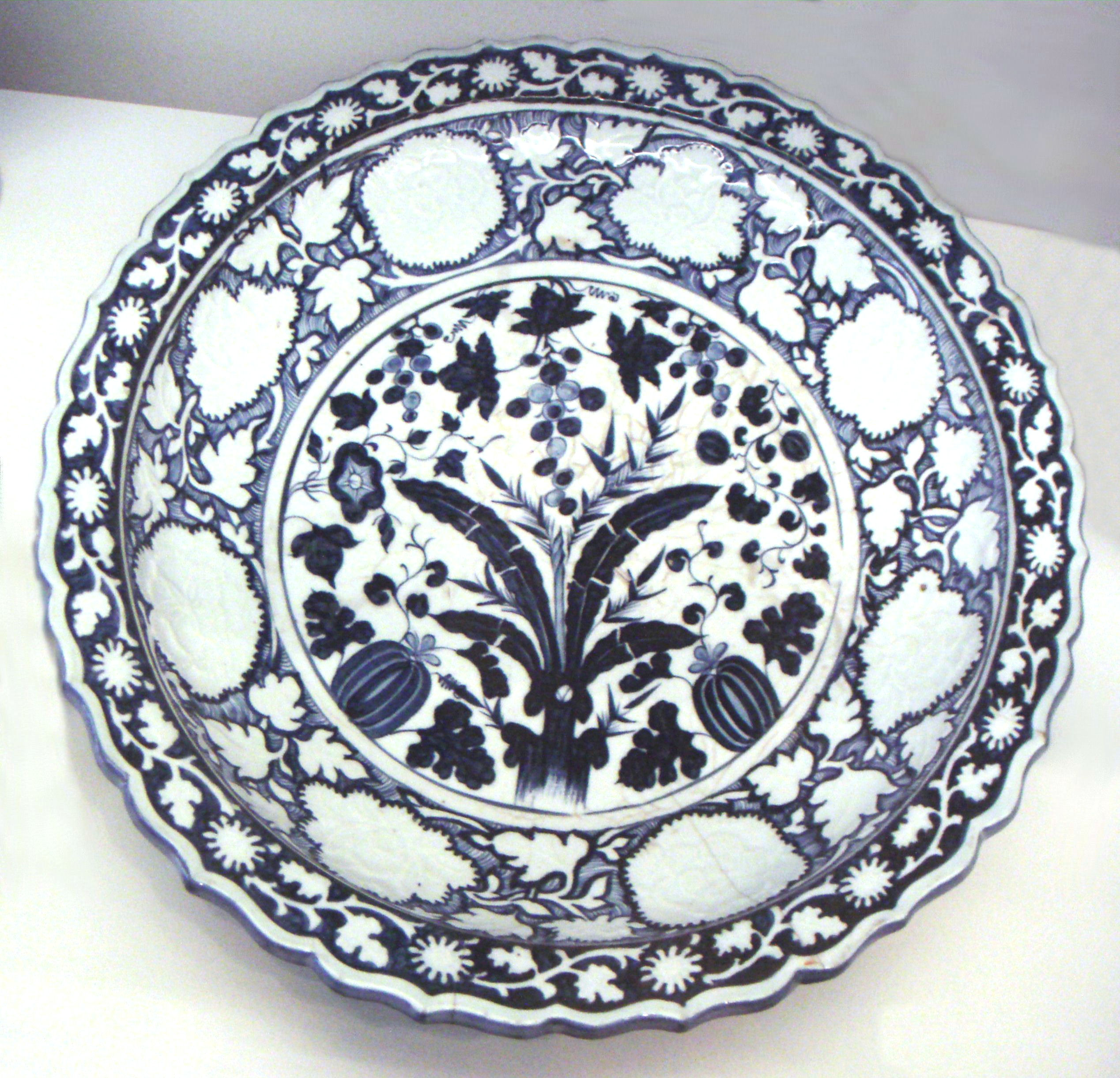
Jingdezhen blue and white plate, mid-14th century

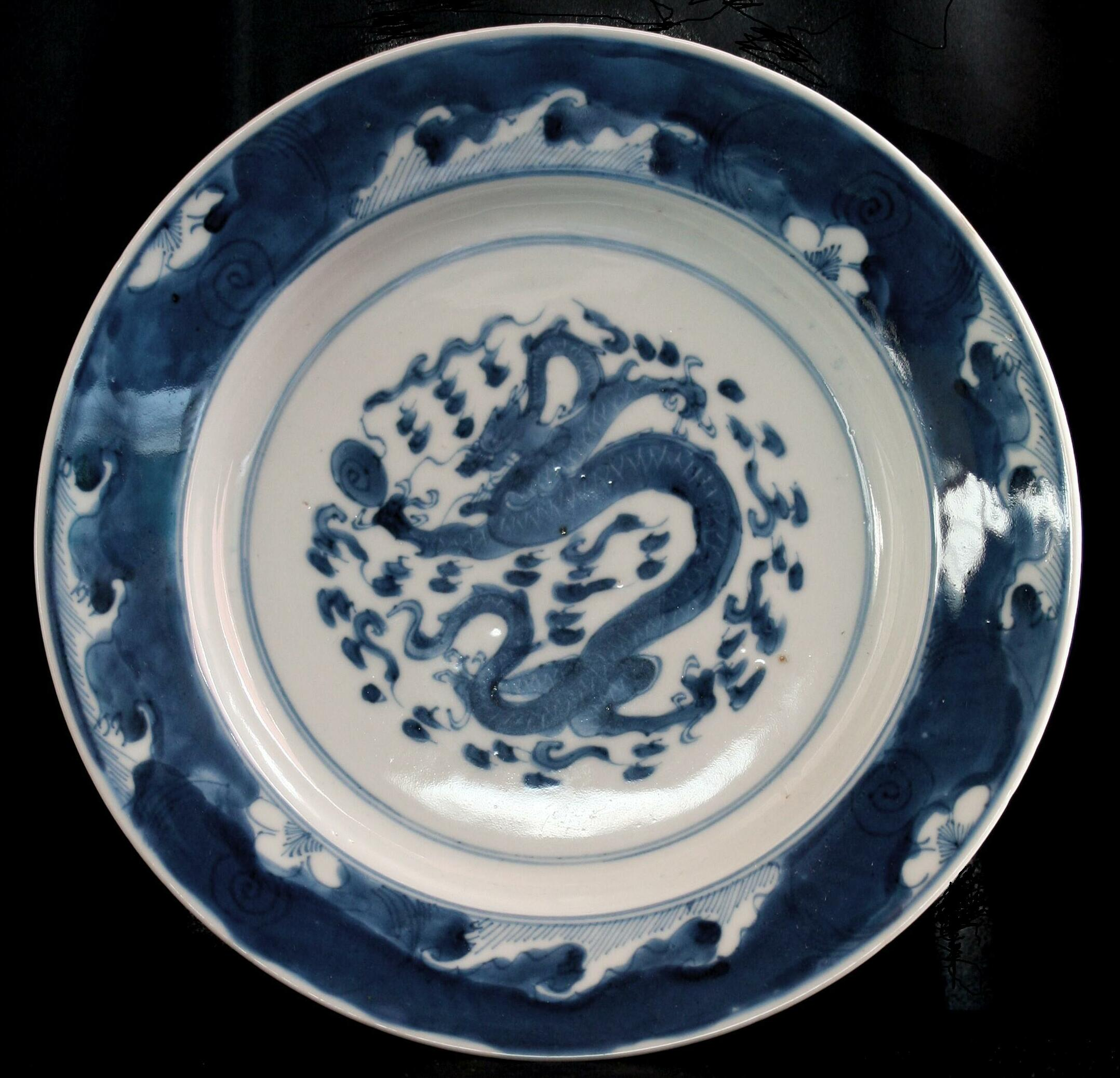
Early Kangxi 17th century, Jingdezhen Ware, Nantoyōsō Collection, Japan

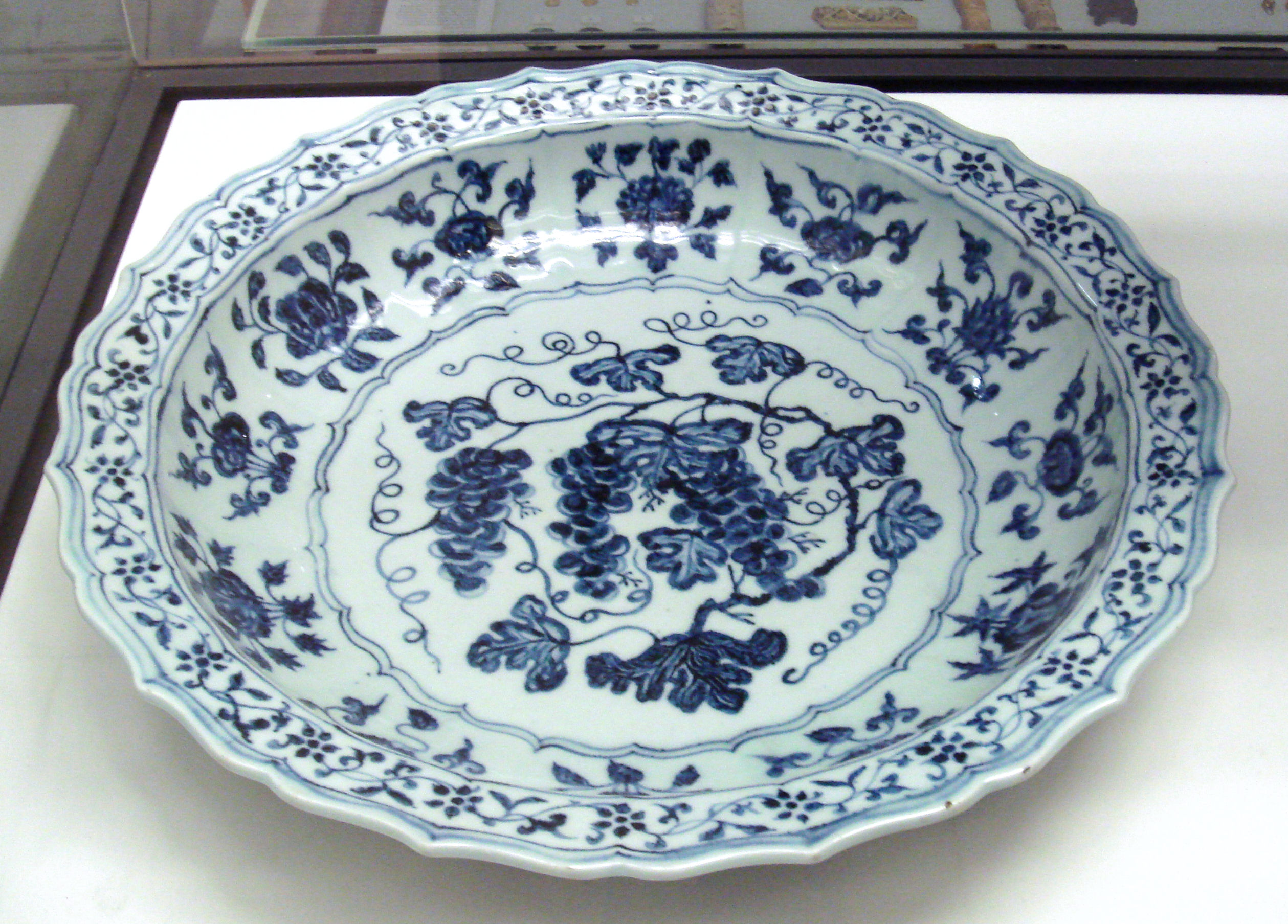
Ming plate with grape design, 15th century, Jingdezhen kilns, Jiangxi, British Museum

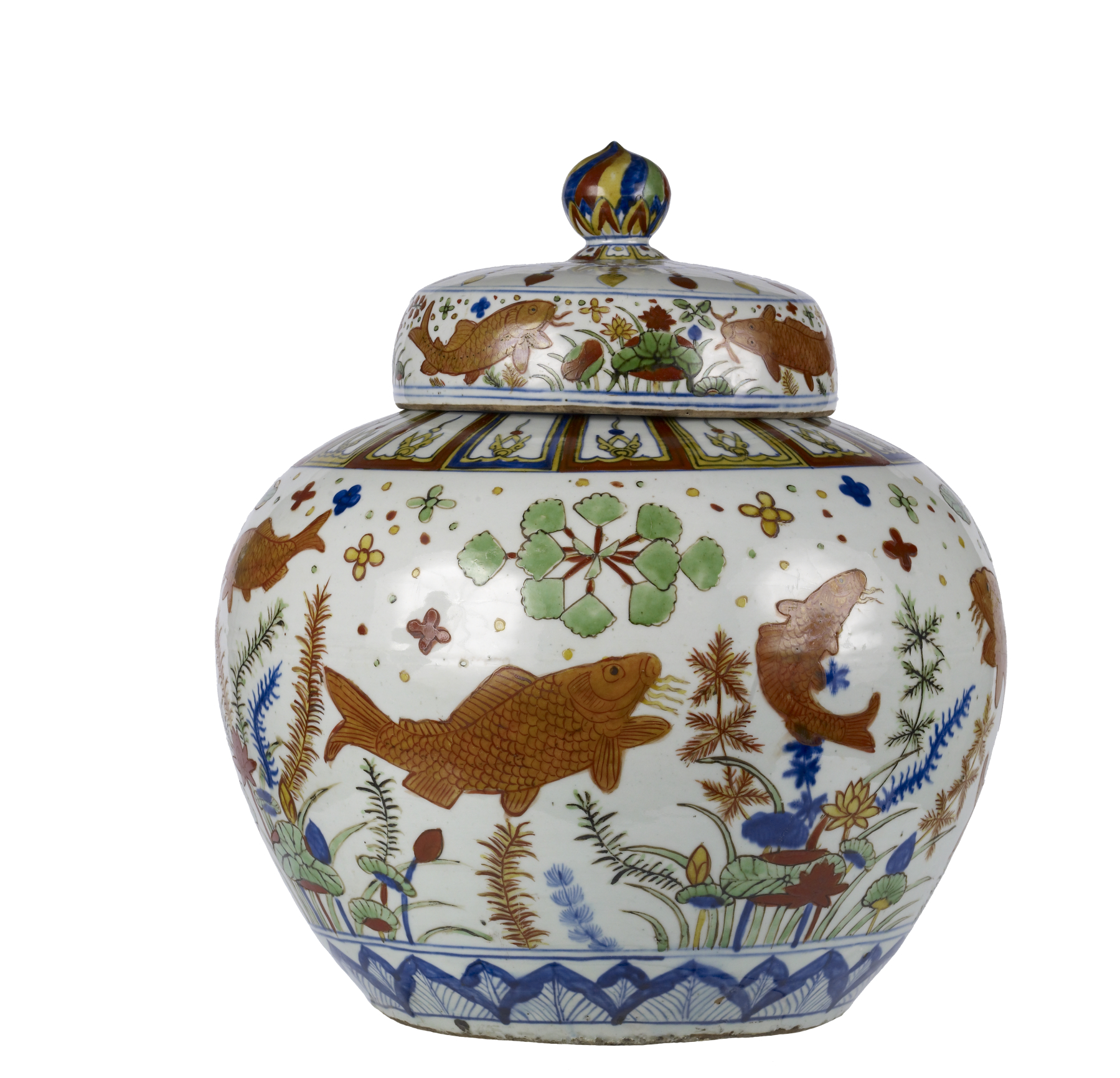
Wine Jar with Carp among Water Weeds and Lotuses, 16th century, The Walters Art Museum

== Economy ==
Jingdezhen serves as an important industrial and commercial base in Jiangxi Province. In 2018, Jingdezhen achieved a GDP of 92.611 billion yuan. Of this, 6.62% of the city's GDP came from its primary sector, 44.22% came from its secondary sector, and the remaining 49.16% came from its tertiary sector.

As of 2018, the per capita disposable income of urban residents in the city is ¥37,183, which ranks third among prefecture-level divisions in Jiangxi (behind Nanchang and Xinyu). Per capita disposable income for rural residents for 2018 is ¥16,510, which ranks fourth among prefecture-level divisions in Jiangxi (behind Pingxiang, Xinyu, and Nanchang).

For 2018, the city's public budget revenue was ¥8.98555 billion, and its public budget expenditure was ¥20.43550 billion.

=== Industry ===
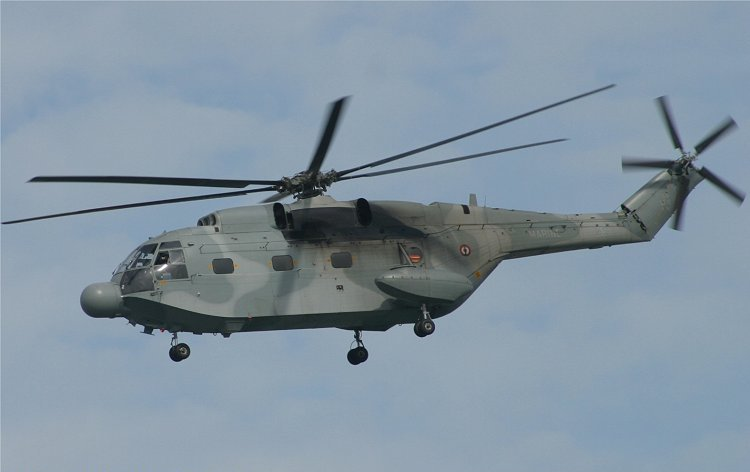
The French SA 321 Super Frelon, which Changhe produces under license as the Z-8

There are some important industrial enterprises in Jingdezhen City, such as Changhe Aircraft Industries Corporation; Jingdezhen Ceramics; Jingdezhen Refrigeration Compressor, etc.

Changhe Aircraft Industries Corporation, a subsidiary of the Aviation Industry Corporation of China, is based in Jingdezhen. The firm, established in 1969, mainly sells helicopters to the People's Liberation Army, but also does business with firms such as Boeing, Sikorsky, and Leonardo. Changhe produces aircraft parts for the Boeing 767-300BCF.

Jiangxi Changhe Automobile Co Ltd, commonly known as Changhe, is an automotive firm owned by BAIC Group which is based in the city. The firm is forecast to produce 53,400 vehicles in 2019.

Jingdezhen Ceramics Co Ltd (景德镇陶瓷股份有限公司) is a joint venture with a French company and is most famous of Jingdezhen's ceramic companies. In February 2002, then-CCP General Secretary Jiang Zemin presented a porcelain set produced by the company under its Hongye (红叶) brand to U.S. President George W. Bush.

Jingdezhen Refrigeration Compressor Company is well known in China for its non-Eph refrigeration compressor. It holds a 20% share of its market in China.

=== Agriculture ===
Agricultural Economic Data of Jingdezhen (2007)
Economic Item		Unit	Data
Name of Items	Statistics range		
Agricultural GDP	city	RMB(yuan)	3.8 billion
Sown area of grain	city	Mu	13.22 billion
Grain output	city	ton	515,000
Meat production	city	ton	47,000
Forestry production	city	RMB(yuan)	2.41 million
Animal husbandry output value	city	RMB(yuan)	1.036 billion
Fishery production	city	RMB(yuan)	262 million
Agricultural services industry	city	RMB(yuan)	161 million
Tea output	Fuliang County	RMB(yuan)	123 million
Aquaculture output	Changjiang District	RMB(yuan)	200 million
Source: Jingdezhen People's Government

Jingdezhen is a major agricultural center in Jiangxi, with extensive rice cultivation within its boundaries. The area is also an important producer of commodity grain, pigs, and cotton.

In Fuliang County there are some large-scale tea plantations and processing facilities. The tea of Fuliang County is well known in China. Bai Juyi, a famous poet of Tang dynasty China, wrote a poem that says "My merchant loved money more than family, he left me to go to Fuliang to buy tea last month". This suggests that one thousand years ago Fuliang was already well known for its tea. In 1915, Fuliang's "Fuhong" brand tea won a golden prize in Panama–Pacific International Exposition.

Leping City, the "Vegetable Township of South China", is a major vegetable growing and processing area for Jiangxi Province even for China. Its vegetable output and sales are important to the agricultural economy of Jiangxi Province. In 2007, Leping had 1.7 million hectares under cultivation that produced a total output of 620,000 tons. The Agriculture Ministry of China also designated Leping as a demonstration zone for "pollution-free" vegetable production.

== Transportation ==
Jingdezhen is the most important transportation hub in the northeast region of Jiangxi province. Historically, Jingdezhen's main communication route was via the Chang River. It could ship its porcelain down the Chang to Poyang Lake and connected there with the Yangtze River in Hukou County, Jiangxi Province. From there the porcelain could get to the coast for export. Today, the city is connected to the rest of China via road, rail, and air.

=== Road ===
- G35, running from Jinan, Shandong to Guangzhou, Guangdong,
- G56 Hangzhou-Ruili Highway from Hangzhou, Zhejiang to Ruili, Yunnan,
- G206, running from Yantai, Shandong to Shantou, Guangdong.

=== Rail ===
The Anhui–Jiangxi Railway connects Jingdezhen to many key cities in China such as Shanghai, Nanjing, Jinan, Qingdao, Hefei, Guangzhou, Fuzhou, Xiamen, Nanchang, Kunming and Guiyang, etc. In addition, the Jiujiang- Jingdezhen-Quzhou Railway is under construction. In the near future, the two rail lines will intersect in Jingdezhen, and make the city an important rail transportation hub in Jiangxi Province and East China. The Jingdezhen Railway Station is located in the city center and is under the control of the Nanchang Railway Bureau.

=== Air ===
Jingdezhen Luojia Airport is located at Luojian Village, northwest of Jingdezhen city, and about 8 km (5.0 mi) from the city's downtown.

CAAC statistics show that in 2008 Jingdezhen Airport served 189,256 passengers, 81st among all Chinese airports. Annual cargo and mail traffic was 119.8 tons; annual landings were 2,424, ranking 111th and 91st respectively in China.

There are flights from Jingdezhen to Beijing(CA), Shanghai(ZH), Guangzhou(ZH), Shenzhen(ZH), Chengdu(CA), Hangzhou(MU), Fuzhou(ZH), Kunming(MU), Xiamen(CA), Xi'an(ZH). There are no international flights. Jingdezhen Airport is the second largest airport in Jiangxi Province. The largest is at Nanchang.

=== Local transit ===
There was only one bus line in Jingdezhen before the 1980s, which was from Huang-ni-tou to Nan-men-tou with a total line distance of 7 kilometres (4.3 miles). In that time, the city had no taxi service and the buses were channel-type bus, it could carry more than one hundred passengers at most at the same time. This kinds of buses were renewed when they were operated to the end of 1990s.

Currently, Jingdezhen public buses and taxis are the two main means of transportation within the city. Nearly more than 20 public bus lines crisscross the city and its countryside. Taxis in Jingdezhen are plentiful; fares start at ¥8 for the first 2 kilometres (1.2 miles).

== Education ==
Jingdezhen has 4 higher education institutions, 110 secondary schools, 328 primary schools, and 4 special education schools.

The city's 4 higher education institutions are the Jingdezhen Ceramic Institute (JCI), Jingdezhen College, Jiangxi Ceramic Arts and Crafts Vocational and Technical College (江西陶瓷工艺美术职业技术学院), and Jingdezhen Ceramic Vocational and Technical College (景德镇陶瓷职业技术学院).

Among the city's secondary schools is the No.1 Middle School of Jingdezhen, which was founded in 1940. It is famous for its success rate, relative to other schools in Jiangxi Province, in placing its students in Chinese colleges.

== Public health ==
Jingdezhen has more than 20 medical service institutions with a total 2182 beds. Doctors and nurses number 2,672. It has the largest hospital system in the north-east of Jiangxi Province. The No.1, No.2 and No.3 People's Hospital of Jingdezhen are the most important hospitals in the city; the No.4 People's Hospital is a psychiatric hospital.

== Tourism ==
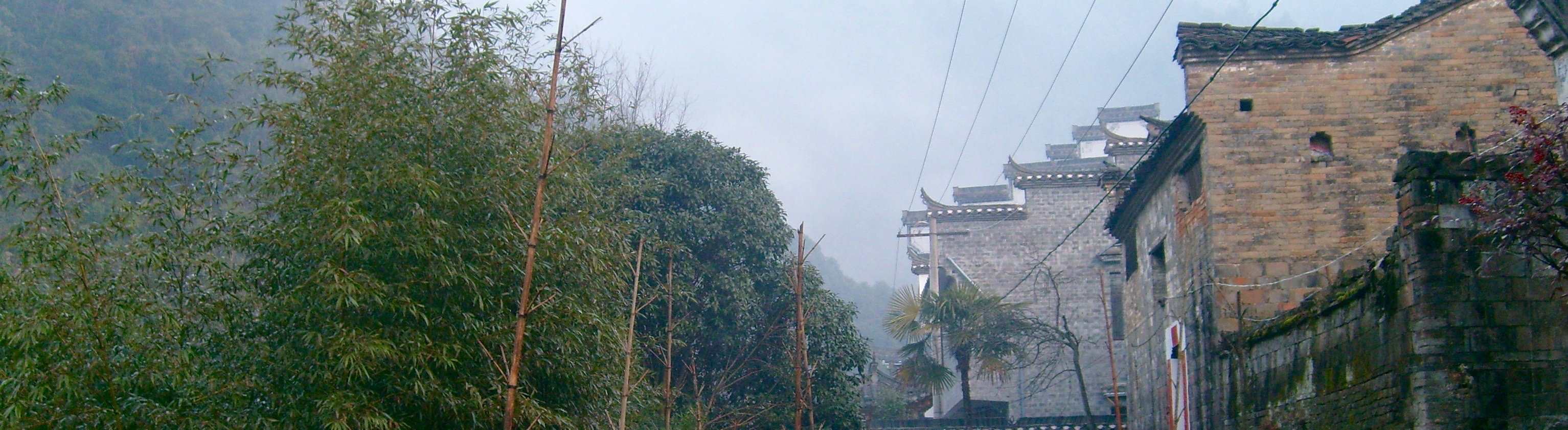
Huizhou architecture (Anhui Province) in Yaoli town, Fuliang county

=== Travel Overview ===
Jingdezhen is a major tourism destination within Jiangxi Province, receiving 150,800 tourists in 2025. Many of the city's tourist attractions are related to the city's famous ceramics, including the Ancient Kiln Folk Customs Museum, a 5A tourist attraction. Jingdezhen also has 8 4A tourist attractions, and 14 3A tourist attractions. The city also provides access to nearby popular tourist areas such as Lushan, Huangshan, and Wuyuan.

At present, Jingdezhen has the most tourist hotels of any city in Jiangxi Province. In the city there is one quasi-five-star hotel, two four-star hotels, and many three-star and other common grade hotels.

== Twin towns – sister cities ==
- : Faenza, Emilia-Romagna, Italy
- : Safi, Morocco
- : Arita, Saga, Japan
- : Seto, Aichi, Japan
- : Icheon, Gyeonggi-do, South Korea
- (United Kingdom) : Redbridge, London, UK
- : Delft, South Holland, Netherlands
- (United States) : Door County, Wisconsin, US

=== Domestic ===
- Chaoyang District, Beijing
- Dongcheng District, Beijing
- Shenzhen, Guangdong
