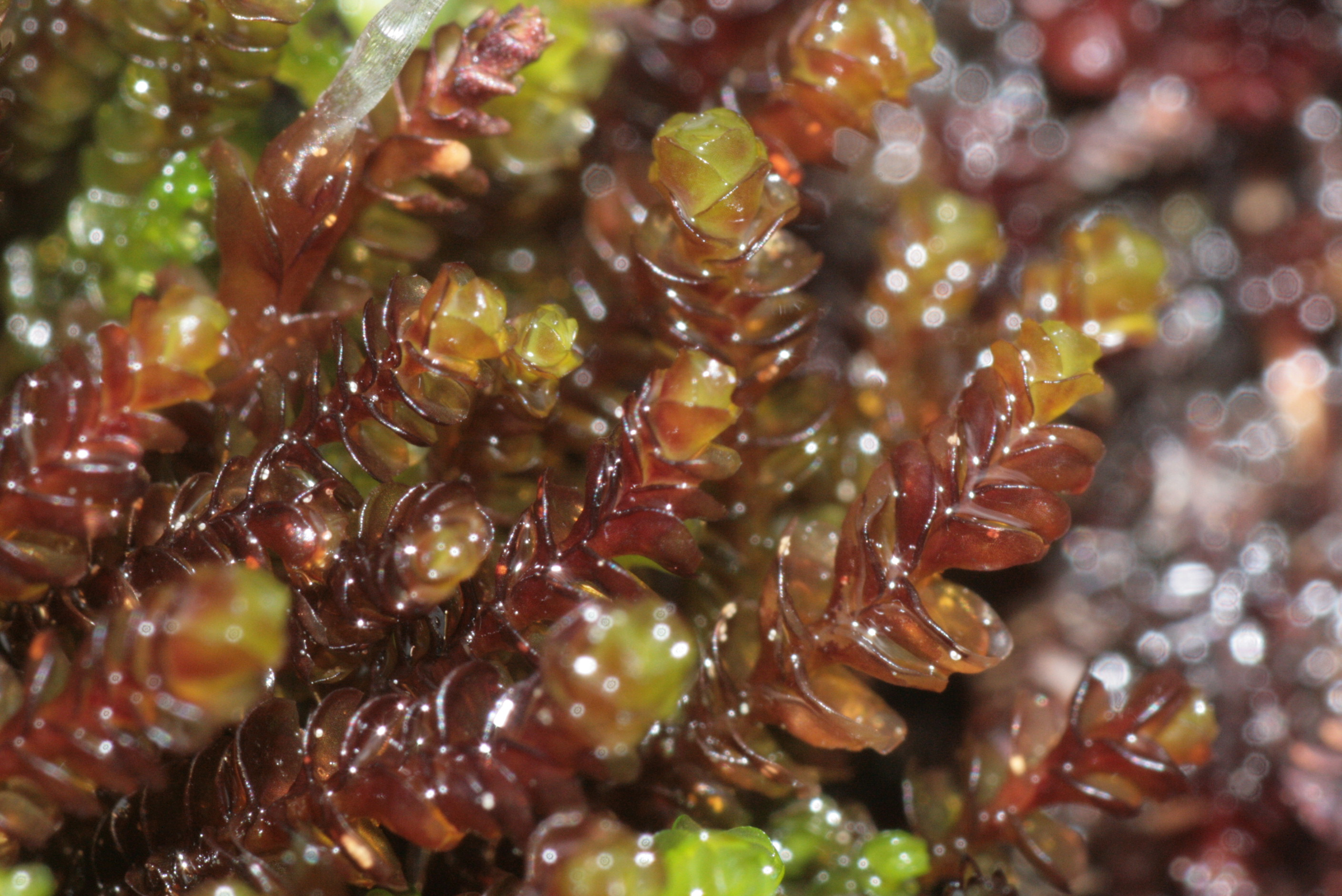
- Marsupella emarginata

Scientific classification
- Kingdom: Plantae
- Division: Marchantiophyta
- Class: Jungermanniopsida
- Order: Jungermanniales
- Family: Gymnomitriaceae
- Genus: Marsupella; Dumort.

Synonyms
- Cesia Lindb.; Sarcocyphos Corda; Sarcoscyphus Corda

= Marsupella =

Genus of liverworts

Marsupella is a liverwort genus in the family Gymnomitriaceae.

The genus has cosmopolitan distribution, but mostly in the northern hemisphere.

== Species ==
As accepted by GBIF;

- Marsupella africana Stephani ex Bonner
- Marsupella alata S.Hatt. & N.Kitag.
- Marsupella alpina (Mass. & Carest.) H. Bern.
- Marsupella andreaeoides (Lindb.) Müll.Frib.
- Marsupella apiculata Schiffn.
- Marsupella aquatica (Lindenb.) Schiffn.
- Marsupella arctica (Berggr.) Bryhn & Kaal.
- Marsupella aurita (Lehm.) Sim
- Marsupella austrogeorgica Hässel de Menéndez
- Marsupella badensis Schiffner
- Marsupella boeckii (Aust.) Kaal.
- Marsupella bolanderi (Aust.) Underw.
- Marsupella brevissima (Dum.) Grolle
- Marsupella capensis S.W.Arnell
- Marsupella condensata (Ångstr. ex C.Hartm.) Lindb. ex Kaal.
- Marsupella crenulata Stephani & C.Massal.
- Marsupella cuspidata Steph.
- Marsupella disticha Steph.
- Marsupella emarginata (Ehrh.) Dum.
- Marsupella exigua Steph.
- Marsupella fengchengensis C.Gao & G.C.Zhang
- Marsupella funckii (Web. & Mohr) Dum.
- Marsupella integra N.Kitag.
- Marsupella involuta Váňa
- Marsupella koreana Bakalin, Fedosov, Cryptogamie & Bryologie
- Marsupella mexicana (Lindenb. & Gottsche) Stephani
- Marsupella microphylla R.M.Schust.
- Marsupella minutissima N.Kitag.
- Marsupella neesii Sande Lac. ex Schiffn.
- Marsupella paroica Schust.
- Marsupella profunda Lindb.
- Marsupella pseudofunckii S.Hatt.
- Marsupella pusilla Steph.
- Marsupella ramosa Müll.Frib.
- Marsupella sparsifolia (Lindb.) Dumort.
- Marsupella sphacelata (Giesecke ex Lindenb.) Dumort.
- Marsupella spiniloba R.M.Schust. & Damsh.
- Marsupella sprucei (Limpr.) Bernet
- Marsupella stableri Spruce
- Marsupella stoloniformis N.Kitag.
- Marsupella subemarginata Bakalin & Fedosov
- Marsupella subhyalina R.M.Schust.
- Marsupella truncato-apiculata (Herzog) Váňa
- Marsupella yakushimensis (Horik.) S.Hatt.
