= Fuliang County =

Fuliang County 浮梁县 Fowliang
- County
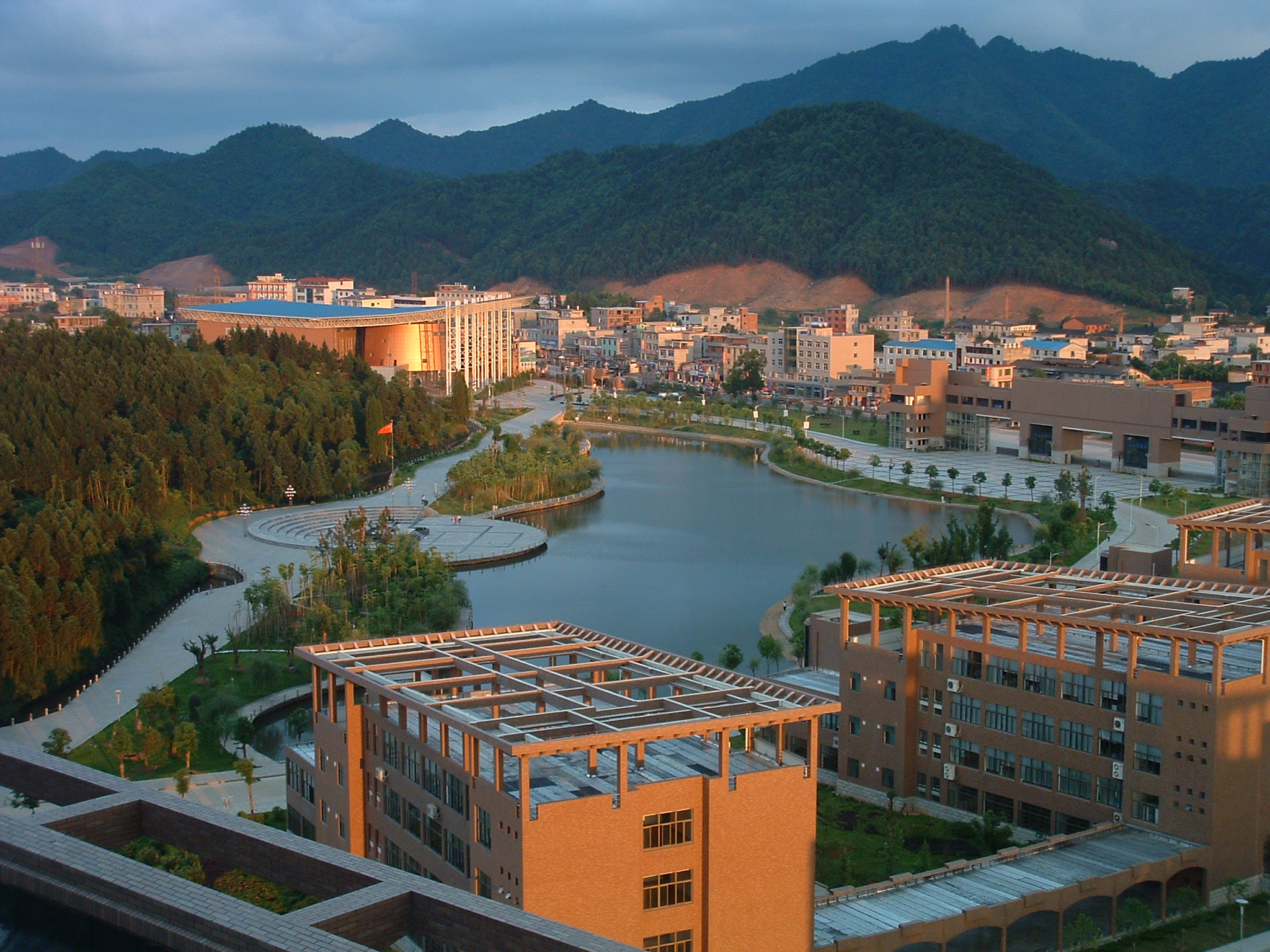

- Location of Fuliang County in Jiangxi
- Coordinates: 29°21′10″N 117°12′54″E
- Country: People's Republic of China
- Province: Jiangxi
- Prefecture-level city: Jingdezhen

Area
  - Total: 2,851 km^{2} (1,101 sq mi)
- Highest elevation (Wugujian): 1,618.4 m (5,310 ft)
- Lowest elevation (Jinzhukeng): 28 m (92 ft)

Population (2019)
  - Total: 317,884
  - Density: 111.5/km^{2} (288.8/sq mi)
- Time zone: UTC+8 (China Standard)
- Postal code: 333400

Fuliang (Chinese: 浮梁县; pinyin: Fúliáng Xiàn) is a county in the northeast of Jiangxi province, People's Republic of China, bordering Anhui province to the north. It is under the administration of the prefecture-level city of Jingdezhen.

Fuliang's historic center is located 8 kms from Jingdezhen's urban center and was historically the administrative center of Jingdezhen division.

The population in 2022 was 280,376.

== History ==
Fuliang was originally named Xinchang (新昌) until 742 AD. The current city was founded in 817 AD after floods necessitated moving the old city. In 1916 the county seat of Jingdezhen was moved away from Fuliang and in 1949 the county was split off as a separate administrative division.

Since the Tang dynasty, Fuliang has been a center of tea production and trade, as well as for production of tea-related utensils such as cups and pots.

== Administrative divisions ==
Fuliang County is divided to 9 towns and 9 townships.

9 towns

- Fuliang (浮梁镇)
- Ehu (鹅湖镇)
- Jinggongqiao (经公桥镇)
- Jiaotan (蛟潭镇)
- Xianghu (湘湖镇)
- Yaoli (瑶里镇)
- Hongyuan (洪源镇)
- Shou'an (寿安镇)
- Sanlong (三龙镇)

9 townships

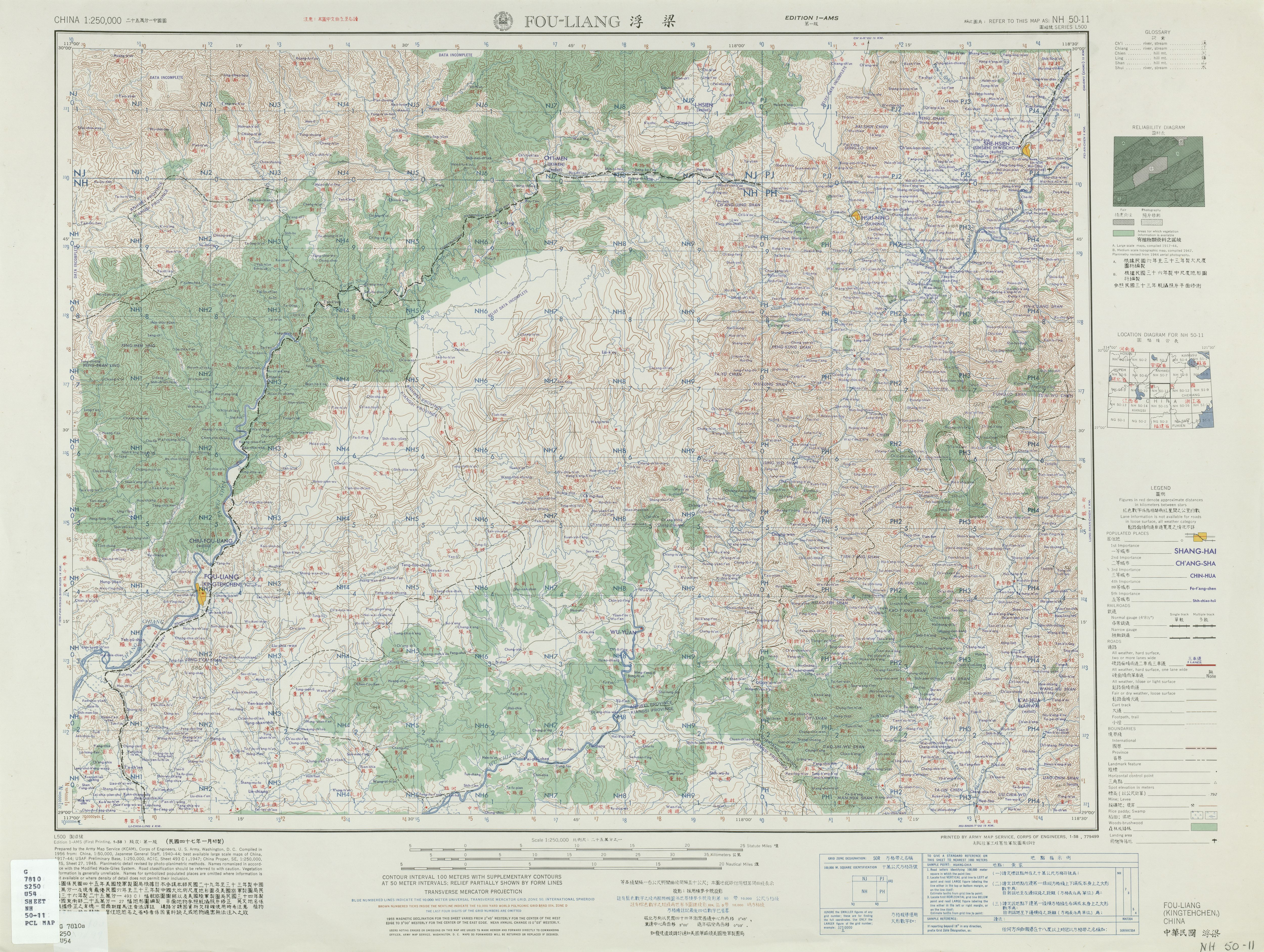
Map including Fuliang (labeled as FOU-LIANG (KINGTEHCHEN) 浮梁) (AMS, 1956)

- Wanggang (王港乡)
- Zhuangwan (庄湾乡)
- Huangtan (黄坛乡)
- Xingtian (兴田乡)
- Jiangcun (江村乡)
- Zhitan (峙滩乡)
- Legong (勒功乡)
- Xihu (西湖乡)
- Luojiaqiao (罗家桥乡)

== Culture ==
Besides Jingdezhen porcelain, Fuliang has some local speciality foods:

- Lengfeng (冷粉), a relatively thick cold vermicelli, circa 0.5 cm in diameter severed with very spicy sauce. It is served with pickled vegetables, orange peels, beans, chives, chili sauce, soy sauce, garlic, and ginger. Before serving it is shortly put in boiling water.
- Dumpling cake, a kind of dumpling wrapped in thin skin and cooked by steaming. A spicy variety is generally filled with radish, a non-spicy one with leek and dried tofu. Locals often eat it for breakfast and lunch.
- Lye‑water rice cake (碱水耙), a type of steamed or boiled rice‑flour cake made with alkaline water, which gives it a springy texture and a slightly yellow color.
- Deep‑fried wontons
- Jingde Banji (景德板鸡), a specialty poultry product made from the local Jinghuang chicken breed of Jiangxi.
