= Changjiang, Jingdezhen =

Changjiang 昌江区
- District
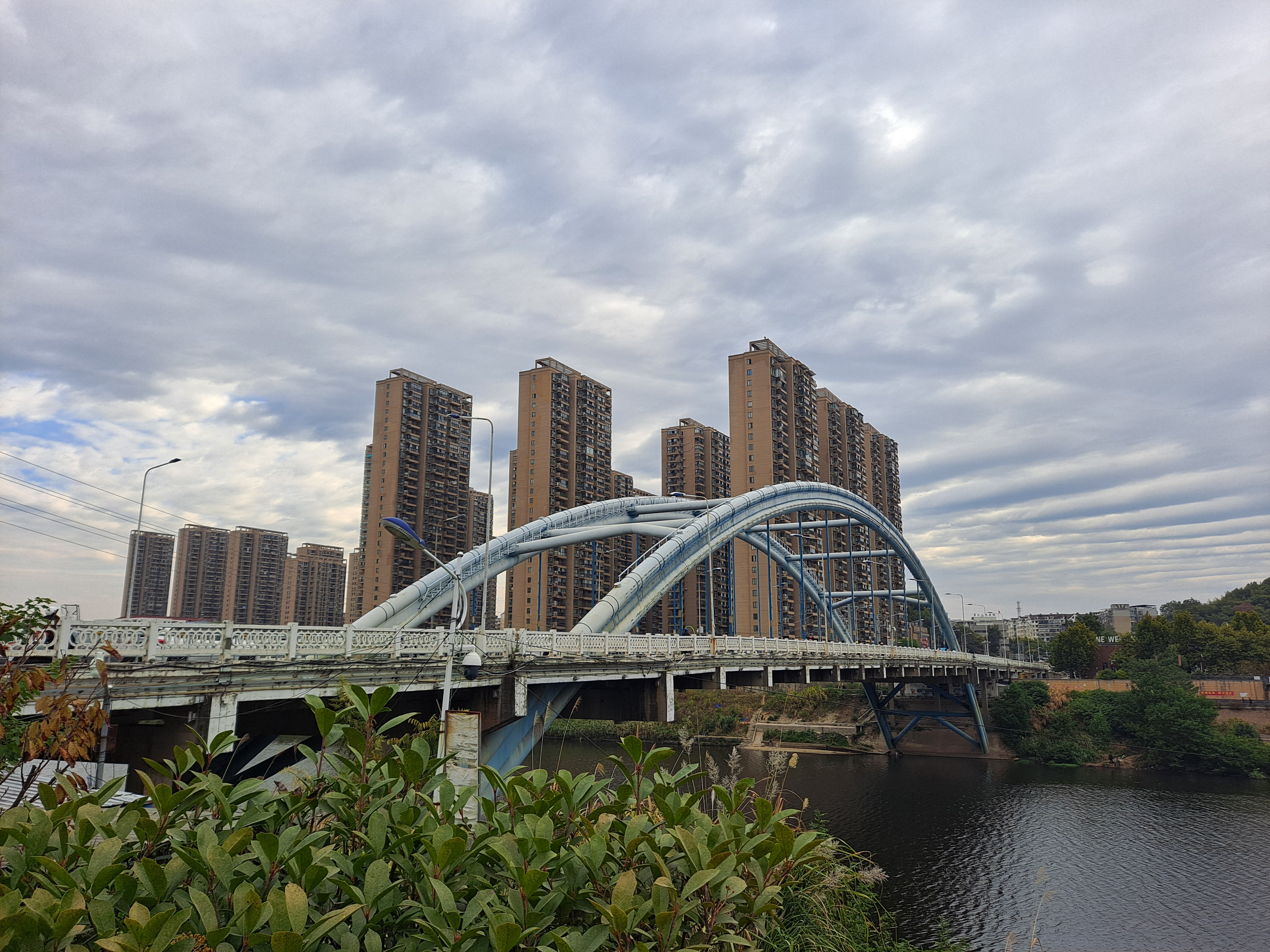
- Interactive map of Changjiang
- Coordinates: 29°16′26″N 117°10′59″E
- Country: People's Republic of China
- Province: Jiangxi
- Prefecture-level city: Jingdezhen

Area
  - Total: 432 km^{2} (167 sq mi)

Population
  - Total: 164,700
  - Density: 381/km^{2} (987/sq mi)
- Time zone: UTC+8 (China Standard)
- Postal code: 333000

Changjiang (Chinese: 昌江; pinyin: Chāngjiāng; lit. 'Chang River') is a district of the city of Jingdezhen, Jiangxi, China.

== Administrative divisions ==
Changjiang District is divided to 2 subdistricts, 2 towns and 3 townships.

2 Subdistricts

- Xijiao (西郊街道)
- Xinfeng (新枫街道)

2 Towns

- Jingcheng (竟成镇)
- Nianyushan (鲇鱼山镇)

3 Townships

- Liyang (丽阳乡)
- Hetang (荷塘乡)
- Lümeng (吕蒙乡)
