= Yaoli, Jiangxi =

Yaoli 瑶里镇
- Town
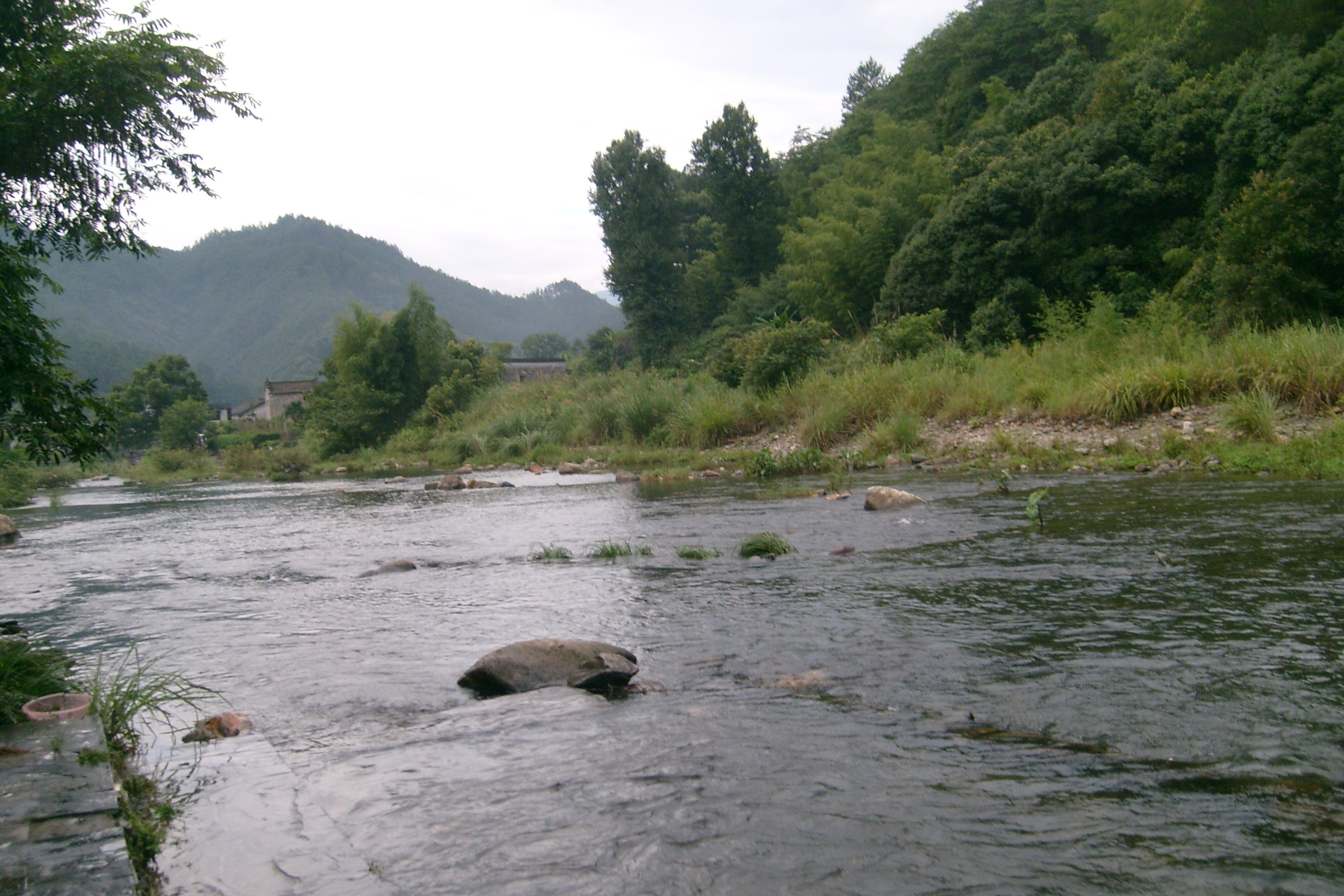
- Yao River passing near the town centre
- Interactive map of Yaoli
- Coordinates: 29°32′52″N 117°34′34″E
- Country: People's Republic of China
- Province: Jiangxi
- Prefecture-level city: Jingdezhen
- County: Fuliang
- Elevation: 114 m (374 ft)
- Time zone: UTC+8 (China Standard)
- Postal code: 333411
- Area code: 0798

Yaoli (Chinese: 瑶里; pinyin: Yáolǐ) is a town of Fuliang County, in the north-east of Jiangxi Province, China, located on the mountainous border region with Anhui. Yaoli is a popular tourism site for its mountain scenery, well preserved old buildings, and historic production of both Chinese porcelain and its main material, petuntse or "porcelain stone". Ceramic production seems to have begun as early as the Tang dynasty, but declined by around 1600 under the Ming dynasty, leaving several abandoned dragon kilns that have been preserved, and a town centre that was largely unchanged until recent years. Both mining of porcelain stone and the production of porcelain continue on a smaller scale, using rather traditional methods.

== Geography ==
Yaoli town is located in the area of the mountains at the border between Anhui and Jiangxi Province, the centre of the town is in the valley.

== Economy ==
According to statistics: In 2007, Yaoli achieved a GDP of RMB 206,510,000; town's fiscal revenue was RMB 21,420,000 and per capita net rural income was RMB 4,429.

== Tourism and local customs ==
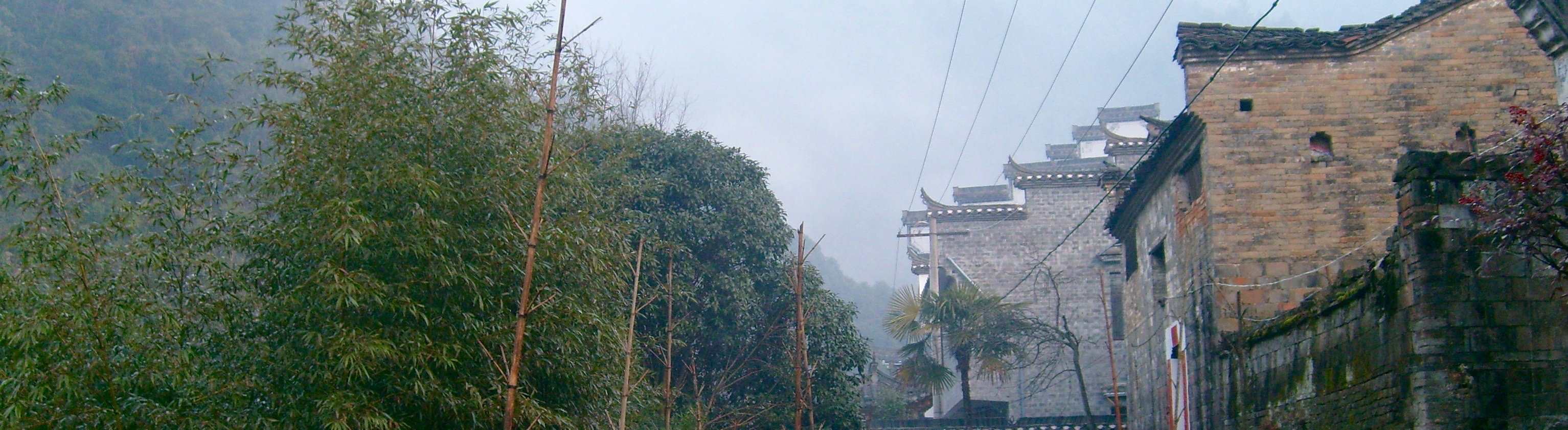
Huizhou architecture of Ming and Qing Dynasty in Yaoli

There are old ruined dragon kilns, which can be visited. To judge by sherds excavated, some of which are displayed in a museum in Jingdezhen, at least latterly the production was of lower-quality popular blue and white pottery, with a red rather than white body. The only piece identified as from Yaoli in the British Museum is one such.

=== Attractions ===
- Nashan Falls
- Natural Forest in Wanghu Village
- Huizhou architecture of Ming and Qing Dynasty

== See also ==
- List of township-level divisions of Jiangxi
