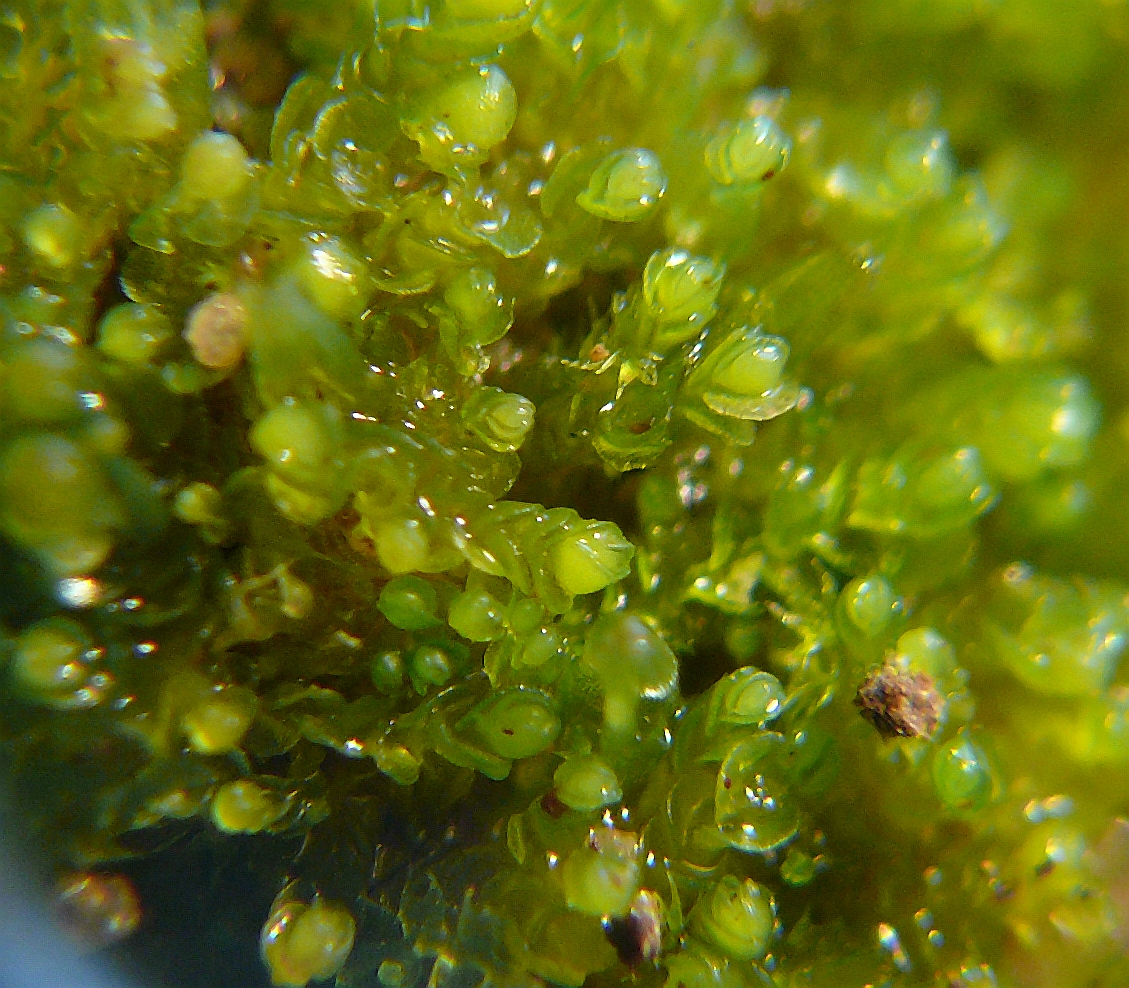
- Nardia scalaris

Scientific classification
- Kingdom: Plantae
- Division: Marchantiophyta
- Class: Jungermanniopsida
- Order: Jungermanniales
- Family: Gymnomitriaceae; Vàňa
- Genus: Nardia; Gray

Synonyms
- Alicularia Corda; Apotomanthus (Spruce) Schiffn.

= Nardia =

Genus of liverworts

Nardia is a genus of liverworts in the family Gymnomitriaceae.

The genus has cosmopolitan distribution, but mostly in the Northern Hemisphere.

== Species ==
As accepted by GBIF;

- Nardia abyssinica (Nees) Cufod.
- Nardia arnelliana Grolle
- Nardia assamica (Mitt.) Amakawa
- Nardia biloba (Horik.) S.Hatt.
- Nardia breidleri (Limpr.) Lindb.
- Nardia compressa (Hook.) Gray
- Nardia crassicaulis (Stephani) S.Hatt.
- Nardia emarginata H.Hara
- Nardia flagelliformis Inoue
- Nardia geoscyphoides Amak.
- Nardia geoscyphus (De Not.) Lindb.
- Nardia grollei Váňa & D.G.Long
- Nardia hiroshii Amak.
- Nardia huerlimannii Grolle & Vána
- Nardia insecta Lindb.
- Nardia japonica Steph.
- Nardia kamtschatica Arnell & C.E.O.Jensen
- Nardia leptocaulis C.Gao
- Nardia lescurii (Austin) Underw.
- Nardia macroperiantha Y.H.Wu & C.Gao
- Nardia minutifolia Furuki
- Nardia nepalensis Amak.
- Nardia nigra (Stephani) S.Hatt.
- Nardia nuda (Lindenb. & Gottsche) Váňa
- Nardia pacifica Bakalin
- Nardia poeltii Váňa
- Nardia scalaris Gray
- Nardia sendaica (Stephani) S.Hatt.
- Nardia sieboldii (Sande Lac.) Stephani
- Nardia subclavata (Steph.) Amakawa
- Nardia succulenta (A.Rich.) Spruce
- Nardia takeana (Stephani) S.Hatt.
- Nardia unispiralis Amakawa
