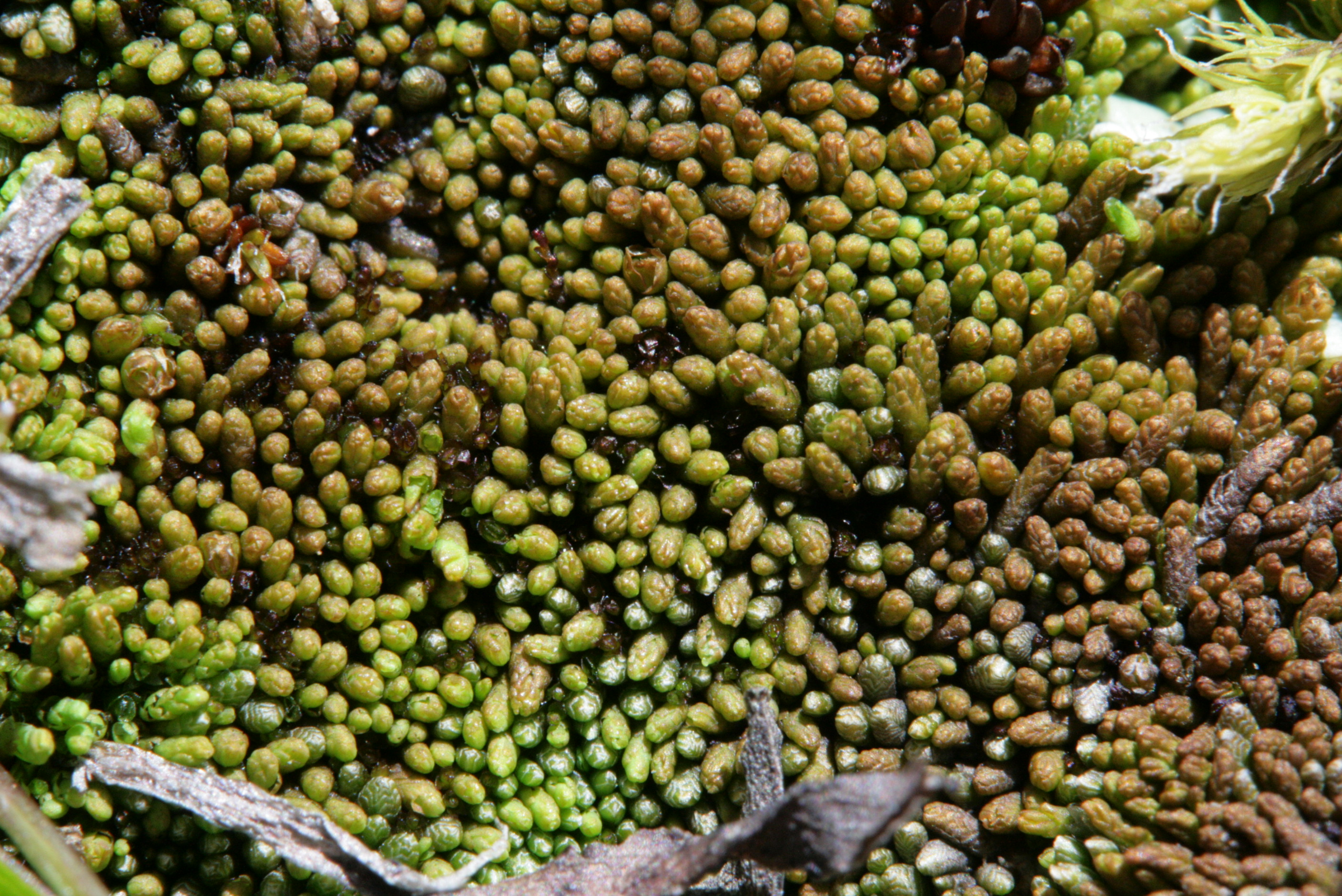
- Gymnomitrion concinnatum

Scientific classification
- Kingdom: Plantae
- Division: Marchantiophyta
- Class: Jungermanniopsida
- Order: Jungermanniales
- Family: Gymnomitriaceae
- Genus: Gymnomitrion; Corda

= Gymnomitrion =

Genus of liverworts

Gymnomitrion is a genus of liverworts, belonging to the family Gymnomitriaceae.

== Species ==
Gymnomitrion has the following 35 species:

- Gymnomitrion adustum
- Gymnomitrion africanum
- Gymnomitrion alpinum
- Gymnomitrion asperulatum
- Gymnomitrion atrofilum
- Gymnomitrion bolivianum
- Gymnomitrion brevissimum
- Gymnomitrion commutatum
- Gymnomitrion concinnatum
- Gymnomitrion corallioides
- Gymnomitrion crenatilobum
- Gymnomitrion crenulatum
- Gymnomitrion crystallocaulon
- Gymnomitrion faurianum
- Gymnomitrion fissum
- Gymnomitrion incompletum
- Gymnomitrion laceratum
- Gymnomitrion miniatum
- Gymnomitrion minutulum
- Gymnomitrion moralesae
- Gymnomitrion mucronulatum
- Gymnomitrion mucrophorum
- Gymnomitrion nigrum
- Gymnomitrion noguchianum
- Gymnomitrion obtusilobum
- Gymnomitrion obtusum
- Gymnomitrion pacificum
- Gymnomitrion parvitextum
- Gymnomitrion revolutum
- Gymnomitrion rubidum
- Gymnomitrion setaceum
- Gymnomitrion sinense
- Gymnomitrion strictum
- Gymnomitrion subintegrum
- Gymnomitrion truncatoapiculatum
- Gymnomitrion verrucosum
