= Cryptocoleopsis =

Scientific classification
- Kingdom: Plantae
- Division: Marchantiophyta
- Class: Jungermanniopsida
- Order: Jungermanniales
- Family: Gymnomitriaceae
- Genus: Cryptocoleopsis; Amakawa

Genus of plants

Cryptocoleopsis is a monotypic genus of liverworts belonging to the family Gymnomitriaceae.

The only species of this genus, Cryptocoleopsis imbricata Amakawa was found in Russian Far East and Japan.
