= Tregonning Hill =

Hill in Cornwall, England

- Site of Special Scientific Interest
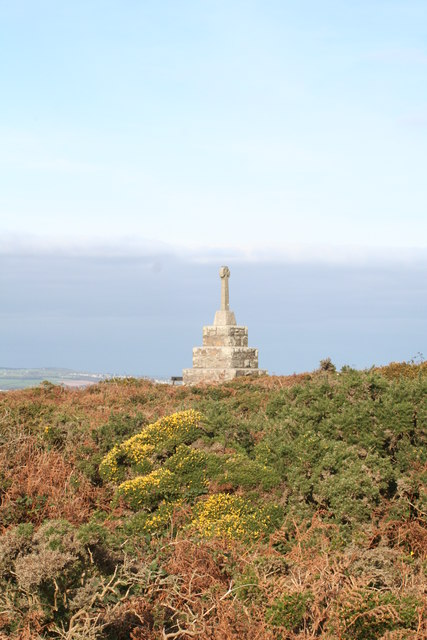
- Germoe war memorial, on the summit of the hill

- Location within Cornwall Location within England
- Location of Tregonning Hill.
- Area of search: Cornwall
- Grid reference: SW602296
- Coordinates: 50.1184°N 5.3551°W
- Interest: Biological
- Area: 5.21 hectares (0.05 km^{2}; 0.02 sq mi)
- Notification date: 1994

Tregonning Hill (Cornish: Bre Gonan for the hill itself, the summit is named Penn Ker) is the westerly of two granite hills overlooking Mount's Bay in west Cornwall, England, United Kingdom, the other being Godolphin Hill. They are approximately 6 kilometres (3.7 mi) west of the town of Helston. The Plymouth chemist William Cookworthy mixed china stone with kaolin, mined from the hill to make Plymouth porcelain in 1768; which was the first time hard-paste porcelain was made in Britain. Part of the hill is designated as a Site of Special Scientific Interest (SSSI) and at the date of notification (1994) was the only known site of western rustwort (Marsupella profunda) in Great Britain.

In July 2023 the hill was listed by Estate Agents for £150,000 and bought by the Cornwall Heritage Trust in November.

== Wildlife and ecology ==
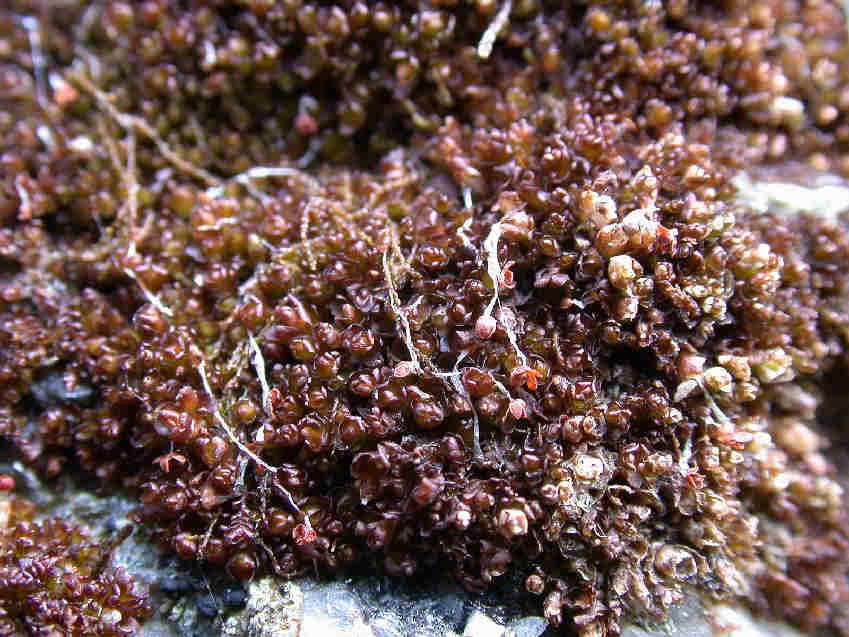
Marsupella profunda

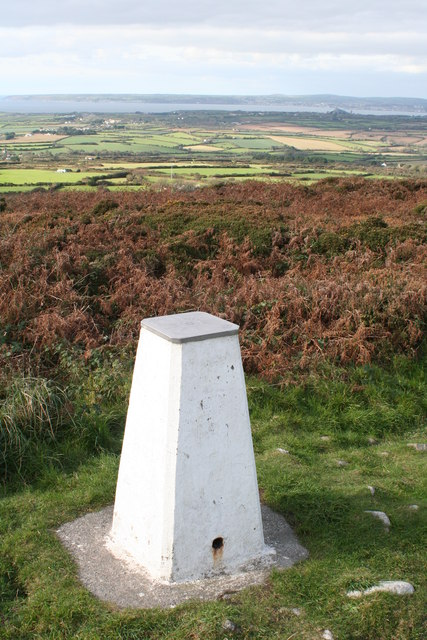
Trig point, Tregonning Hill

The main vegetation types on the hill are western lowland heath and scrub. The heath consists of a mixture of heather (Calluna vulgaris), bell heather (Erica cinerea) and western gorse (Ulex gallii] with cross–leaved heath (Erica tetralix) replacing E. cinerea in wet areas. Bilberry (Vaccinium myrtillus) and tormentil (Potentilla erecta) also occur. On the deeper soils European gorse (Ulex europaeus), bracken (Pteridium aquilinum) and bramble (Rubus fruticosus) are the dominant scrub species. The bare slopes of the old china clay works are where western rustwort (Marsupella profunda) occurs. By 2004 the liverwort was known from fourteen sites within three SSSIs, making Cornwall the main stronghold globally. The nationally scarce moss (Brachydontium trichodes) known from only two sites in Cornwall also occurs on Tregonning Hill.

The condition of the SSSI was considered to be ″unfavourable declining" in September 2010 and by November 2023 was still ″unfavourable - No change″.

== History ==
On the top of the hill is Castle Pencaire, an Iron Age hillfort, two rounds and a field system which are all scheduled under the Ancient Monuments and Archaeological Areas Act 1979, as a ″multi-period archaeological landscape″. Due to scrub and tree growth it is in a poor condition and is on Historic England's, Heritage at Risk Register.

The grade II listed Germoe war memorial is on the summit of the hill within the hillfort.

=== Industry ===
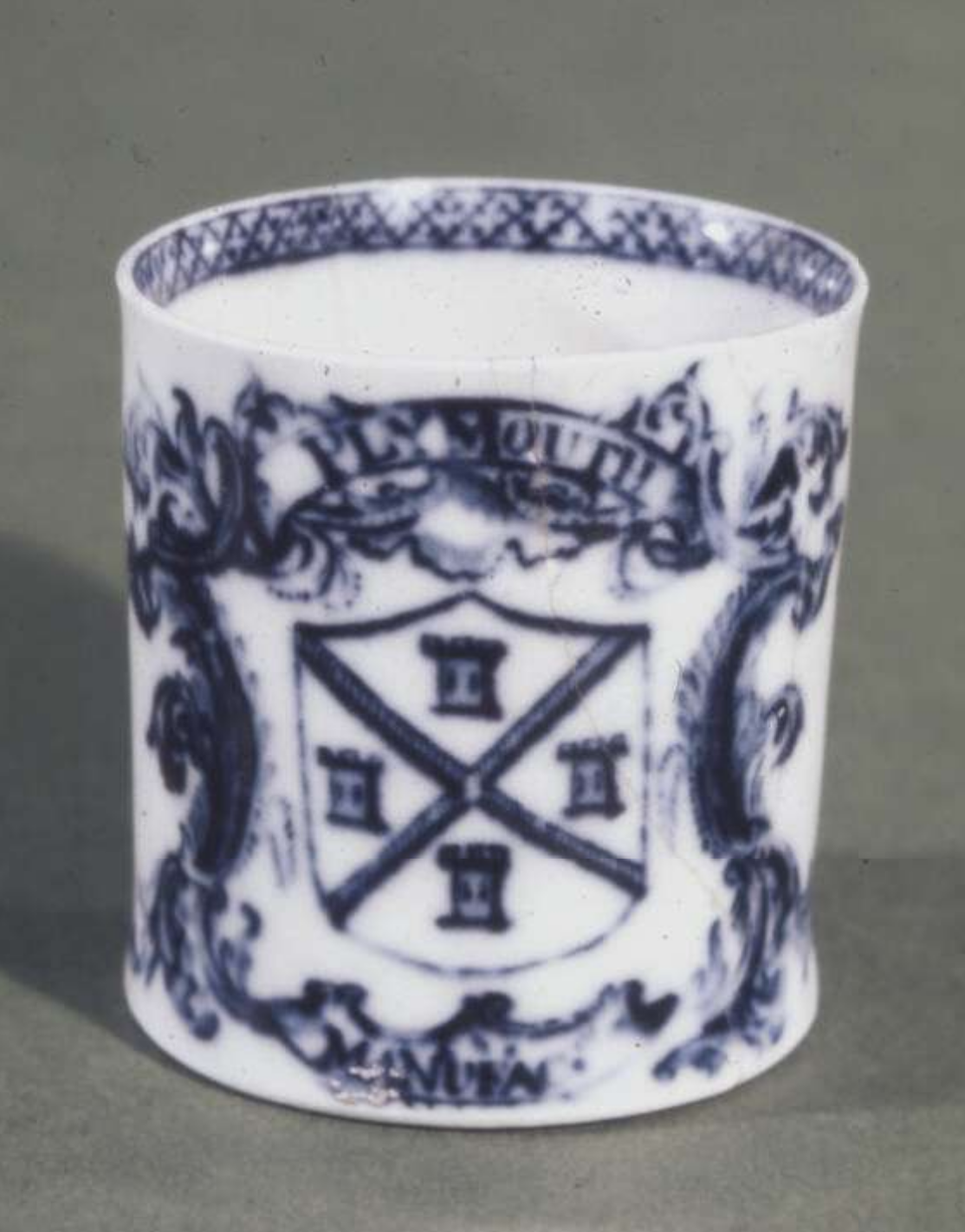
A tankard made by William Cookworthy, using kaolin mined at Tregonning Hill, dated March 14, 1768. was the first piece of hard-paste porcelain ever produced in Britain.

Tregonning Hill is a detached outcrop of the Cornubian batholith. The granite has been altered by kaolinization resulting in china clay. Disused pits, gullies, waste-tips and debris litter the hillside. While visiting the area in 1745, William Cookworthy, a Plymouth chemist observed a very fine clay being used to repair furnaces. Cookworthy had previously studied how to make hard-paste porcelain, which at that time could only be imported from China and Germany. He subsequently searched for a suitable clay so that porcelain could be made in Britain and found that when mixed with china stone the clay from Tregonning Hill was suitable. He took leases on the hill and exported the clay from Porthleven to Plymouth. A cider tankard Cookworthy produced in the spring of 1768 was the first successful firing of hard-paste porcelain in Britain. The tankard, now in the collection of the British Museum, features a scrolling banner with the name of Cookworthy's fledgling pottery, "Plymouth Manufactory" around the arms of the city of Plymouth, painted in underglaze blue, and a date and maker's mark on the base, "March 14, 1768 C.[ookworthy] F.[ecit]

In the 1870s china clay from Tregonning, and a 30 to 40 acre quarry at Tresowes on the western side of hill, was shipped from Porthleven; the amounts were 92 tons in 1876, 130 in 1877, 61 in 1878, 136 in 1879 and none in 1880. Export of china clay and fire bricks to New York via Hayle first started in August 1880. In 1882, Tresowes produced 700 tons, while Tregonning Hill produced 500 tons.

In the early 1870s the Tregonning Hill China Clay and Brick Works was established by William Argall. He had the financial backing of two ironfounders; William Harvey of Hayle and John Toy of Helston. A Scrivener kiln (grid reference SW60492991) is the only part of the brickwork's which can still be seen. In the early 1880s, ten people were employed at the brickworks and the approximate annual number of bricks produced was 150,000. According to Historic England the partly ruinous kiln is probably of the 18th-century and in 1987 was given a grade II listing. An Ordnance Survey map published in 1907 indicates the site was disused by then.

An elvan quarry was in operation on the summit in 1879.

== Religion ==
In 1880 The Cornishman reported on the annual custom, by the Ashtown Free Church Sunday scholars (Ashton), to walk in procession to the ″old amphitheatre″ for a sermon.

== 1941 Aircraft crash site ==
In 1941 a Bristol Beaufort MK1 plane with the registration number 'W6483' of 217 Squadron left RAF St.Eval with a crew of four at 11:50 along with 2 other planes to attack what was believed to be an enemy vessel in the Bay of Biscay. The vessel was not found by two of the planes and the third plane located it but chose not to attack. Upon returning W6483 ran into fog and crashed at County Quarry on Tregonning Hill. The crash was heard in the surrounding villages and the plane was burnt up killing all four of its occupants. There is a memorial carved into a rock at County Quarry to the four men who died.
