= Zhushan, Jingdezhen =

Coordinates: 29°18′00″N 117°12′10″E

Zhushan 珠山区
- District
- Interactive map of Zhushan
- Country: People's Republic of China
- Province: Jiangxi
- Prefecture-level city: Jingdezhen

Area
  - Total: 111 km^{2} (43 sq mi)

Population
  - Total: 330,000
  - Density: 3,000/km^{2} (7,700/sq mi)
- 2018
- Time zone: UTC+8 (China Standard)
- Postal code: 333000

Zhushan District (Chinese: 珠山区; pinyin: Zhūshān Qū) is a district of the city of Jingdezhen, Jiangxi province, China.

== Administrative divisions ==
Zhushan District has 9 subdistricts.

9 subdistricts

- Shishibu (石狮埠街道)
- Xinchang (新厂街道)
- Licun (里村街道)
- Zhoulukou (周路口街道)
- Changjiang (昌江街道)
- Xincun (新村街道)
- Zhushan (珠山街道)
- Taibaiyuan (太白园街道)
- Changhe (昌河街道
