= China stone =

Type of altered granite

China stone – St Probus, Probus, Cornwall, 2023

China stone (occasionally Cornish stone or Cornwall stone) is a medium-grained, feldspar-rich partially kaolinised granite characterised by the absence of iron-bearing minerals.

Its mineral content includes quartz, feldspar and mica; accessory minerals include kaolinite and fluorspar. It is found in one area near St Austell, Cornwall in the United Kingdom. It was the last UK sourced feldspathic material to be commercially extracted.

A number of varieties, named on the basis of their hardness and physical appearance, were produced. Maximum production was achieved in the early 1950s, with around 70,000 tonnes per year. The largest producer, English China Clays, ceased production in 1973, when Goonvean Ltd became the sole producer. Due to increasing competition from imported alternatives and a contracting domestic market, sales fell from 8,000 tonnes per year to 2,800 tonnes in 2001. The last quarry closed in 2006.

Relatively similar material has been mined, and exported to England for ceramics use, in the Isle of Man and Jersey.

China stone is sometimes confused with the Chinese material traditionally known as petuntse as well as other Asian pottery stones. However, although somewhat similar they differ in mineralogy.

== See also ==
- Geology of Cornwall
