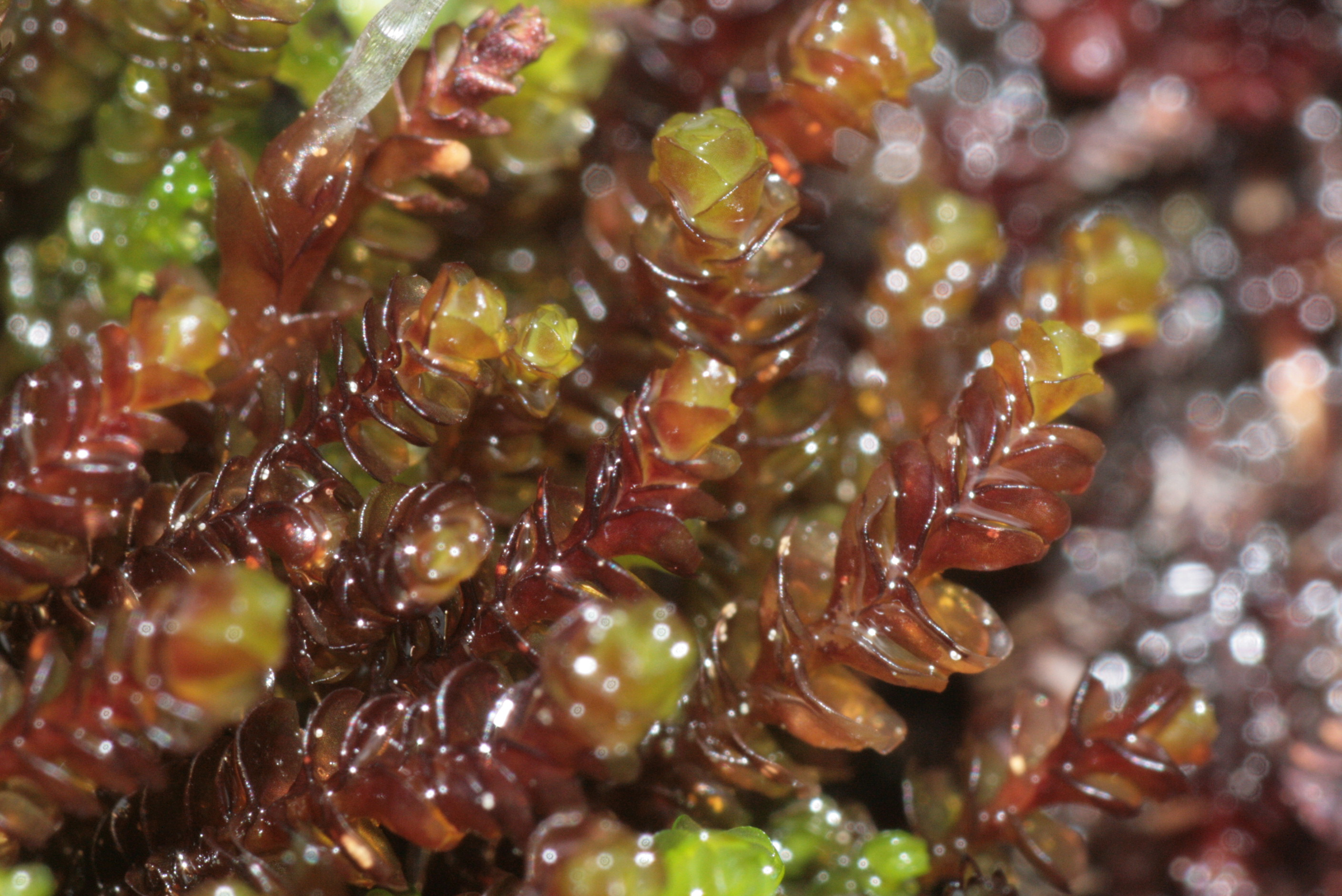
- Marsupella emarginata

Scientific classification
- Kingdom: Plantae
- Division: Marchantiophyta
- Class: Jungermanniopsida
- Order: Jungermanniales
- Family: Gymnomitriaceae; H.Klinggr.

Genera
- See text

= Gymnomitriaceae =

Species of liverwort

Gymnomitriaceae is a liverwort family in the order Jungermanniales.

== Subfamilies and genera ==
Subfamilies and genera included in Gymnomitriaceae:

  - Acrolophozia R.M.Schust. (not assigned to a subfamily)
  - Nanomarsupella R.M.Schust. ex A.Hagborg (not assigned to a subfamily)
  - Paramomitrion R.M.Schust. (not assigned to a subfamily)
- Gymnomitrioideae T.Jense
  - Cryptocoleopsis Amakawa
  - Gymnomitrion Corda
  - Marsupella Dumort.
  - Poeltia Grolle
  - Prasanthus Lindb.
- Nardioideae Váňa
  - Nardia Gray
