= Petuntse =

Type of rock used in manufacture of ceramics

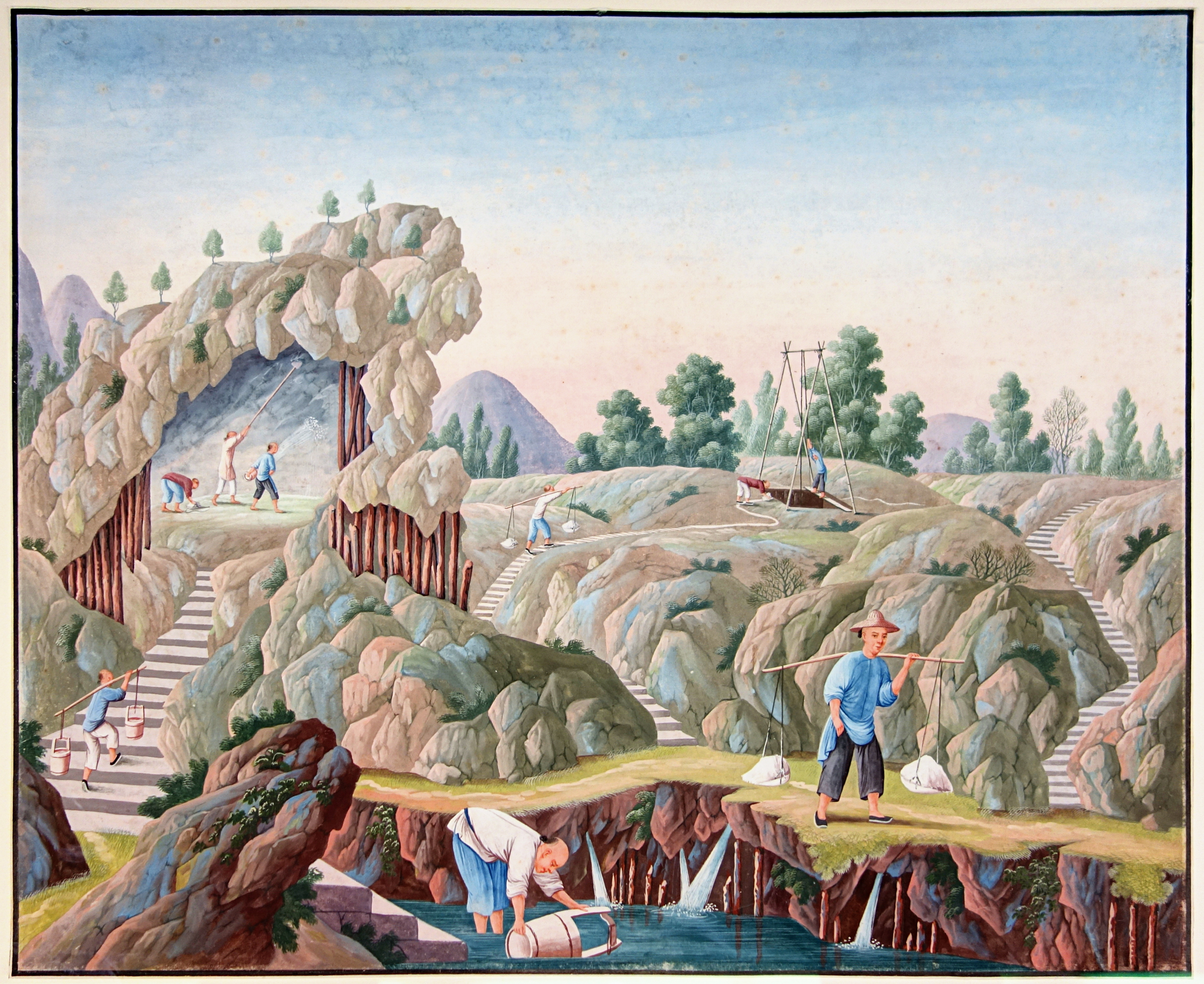
19th century illustration of the extraction of petuntse and kaolin in China

Petuntse (from Chinese: 白墩子; pinyin: báidūnzì), also spelled petunse and bai dunzi, baidunzi, is a historic term for a wide range of micaceous or feldspathic rocks. However, all will have been subject to geological alteration of igneous rocks that result in materials which, after processing, are suitable as a raw material for some ceramic formulations. The name means "little white bricks", referring to the form in which it was transported to the potteries (compare ball clay).

It was, and to some extent continues to be, an important raw material for porcelain. The name pottery stone is now used. The alternative name of porcelain stone is occasionally used.

According to one source, it is mixed with kaolin in proportions varying according to the grade of porcelain to be produced; equal quantities for the best and two thirds petuntse to one third kaolin for everyday ware. There were large deposits of high-quality stone in Jiangxi province in south-eastern China, which became a centre for porcelain production, especially in Jingdezhen ware.

== Non-Chinese pottery stones ==
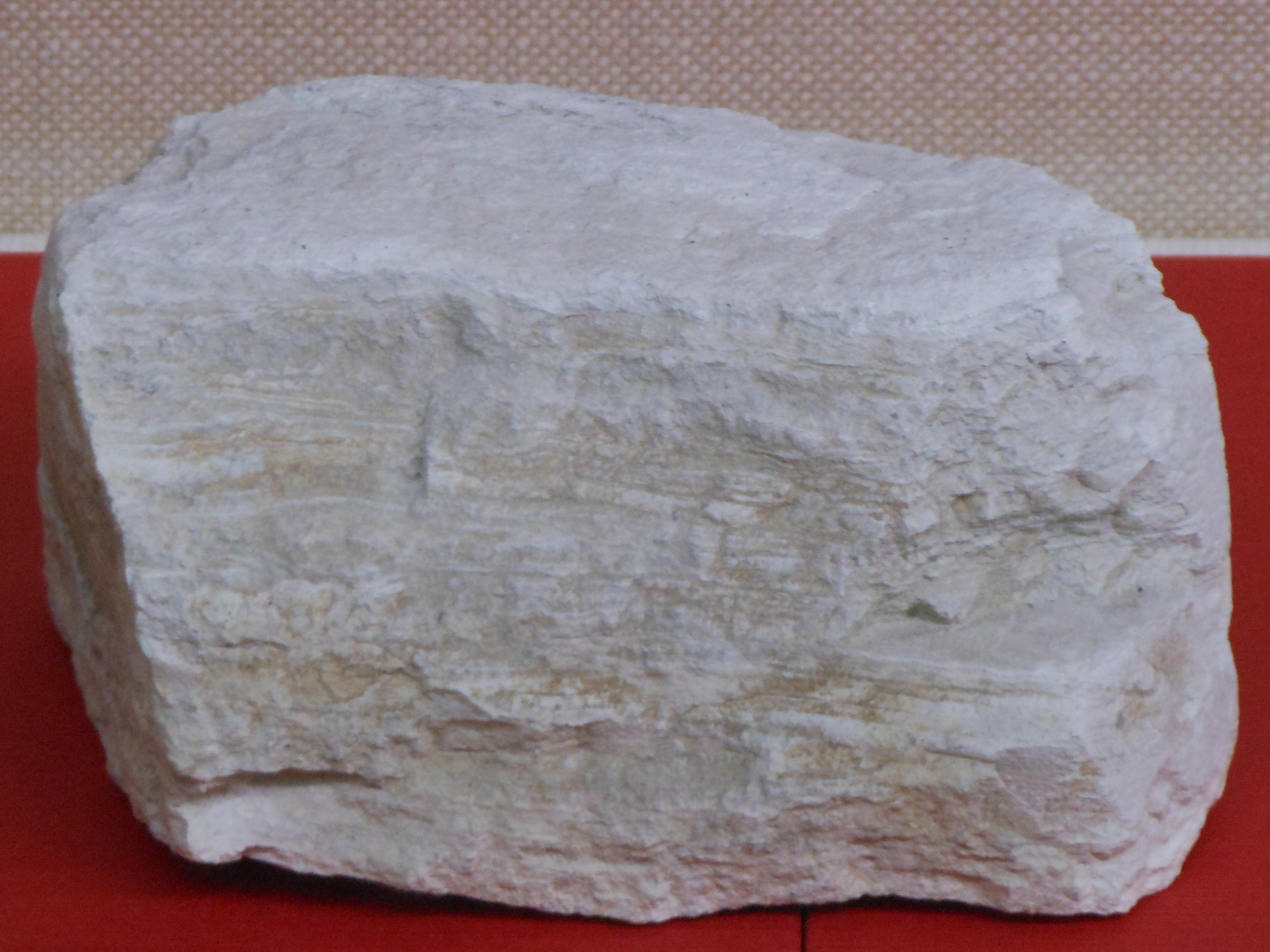
A lump of Japanese pottery stone

Similar material is found, and used, in Japan, Korea and Thailand.

China stone, which is found uniquely in southwestern England, shares some similarities to Asian pottery stones, although there are differences in mineralogy. Relatively similar material to China stone has been mined, and exported to England for ceramics use, in the Isle of Man and Jersey.
