= Ningguo railway station =

Railway station in Anhui, China

Ningguo 宁国
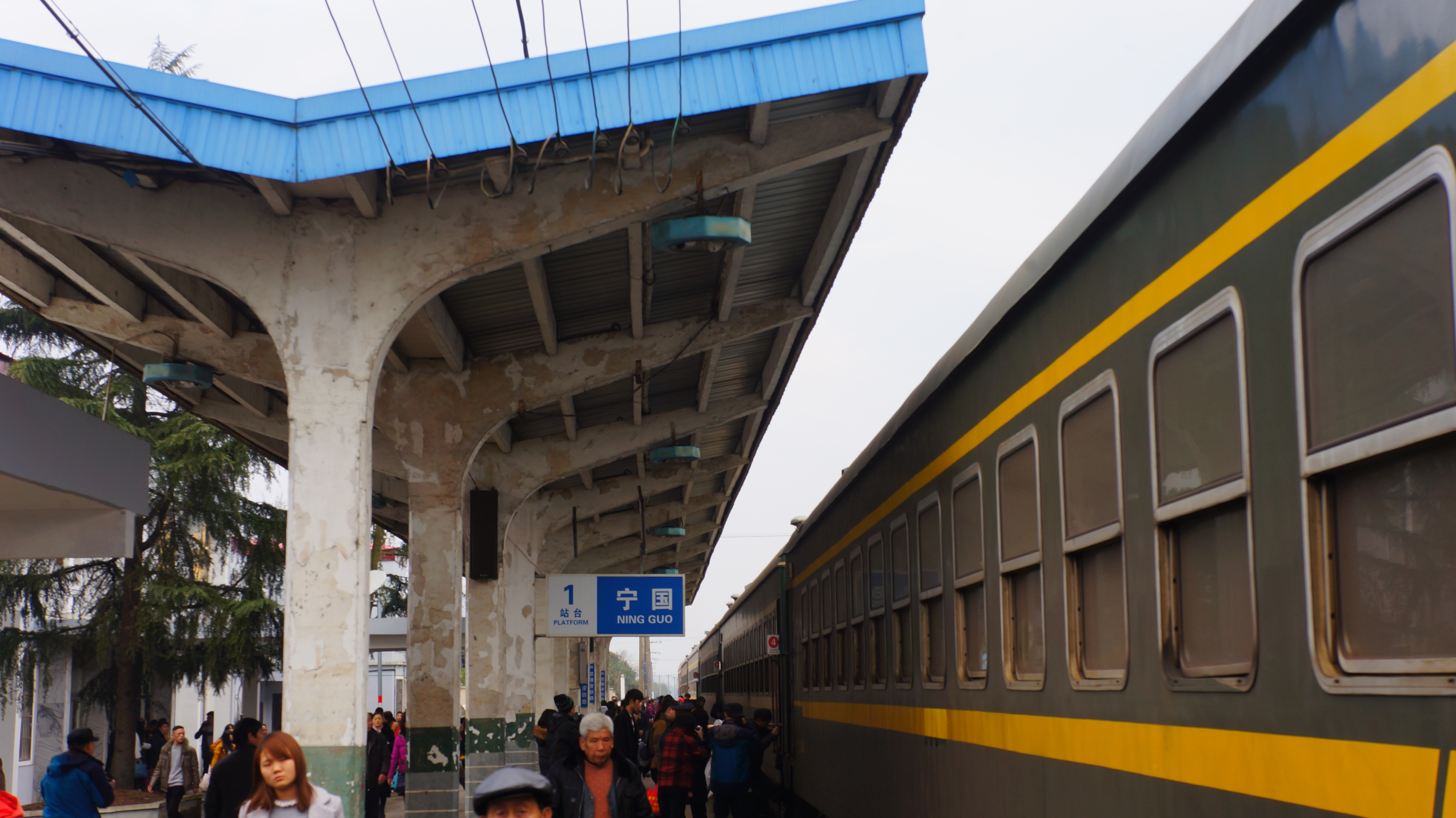

General information
- Location: Ningguo, Xuancheng, Anhui; China
- Coordinates: 30°38′16″N 118°59′14″E
- Line(s): Anhui–Jiangxi railway

History
- Opened: April 1974

Ningguo railway station (Chinese: 宁国站) is a railway station in Ningguo, Xuancheng, Anhui, China. It is an intermediate stop on the Anhui–Jiangxi railway.

== History ==
The railway station opened in April 1974.
