= Hongcun Town, Anhui =

Coordinates: 30°00′N 117°59′E

Hongcun
- Town

Chinese transcription(s)
  - Chinese: 宏村
- Interactive map of Hongcun
- Country: China
- Province: Anhui
- Prefecture: Huangshan City
- District: Yi County
- Time zone: UTC+8 (China Standard Time)

Hongcun (Chinese: 宏村) is a town in Yi County, Huangshan City, Anhui Province, China. It was formerly known as Jilian (际联).

== See also ==
- List of township-level divisions of Anhui
- Hongcun
