= Tunxi District =

Tunxi 屯溪区 Tunki
- District
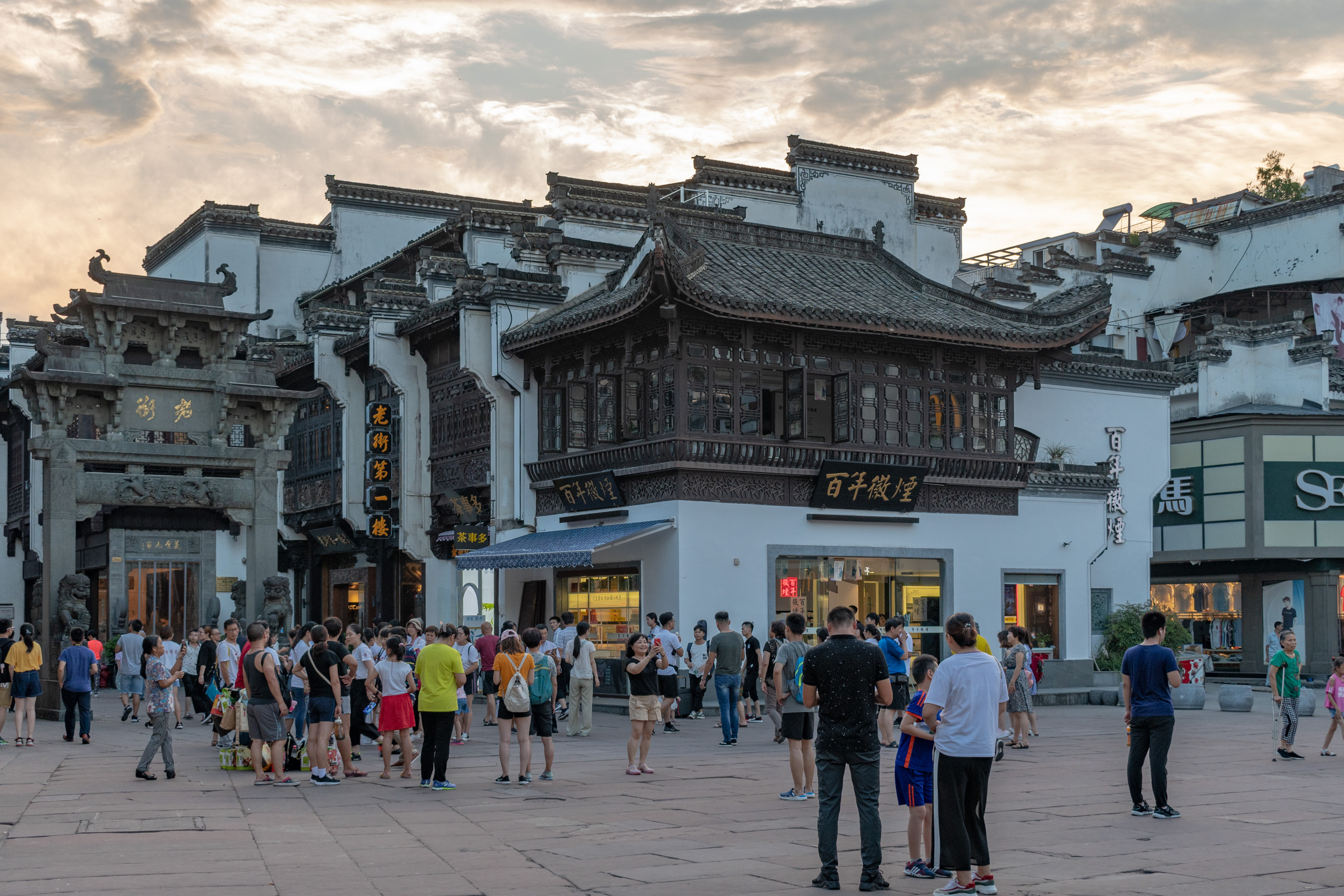
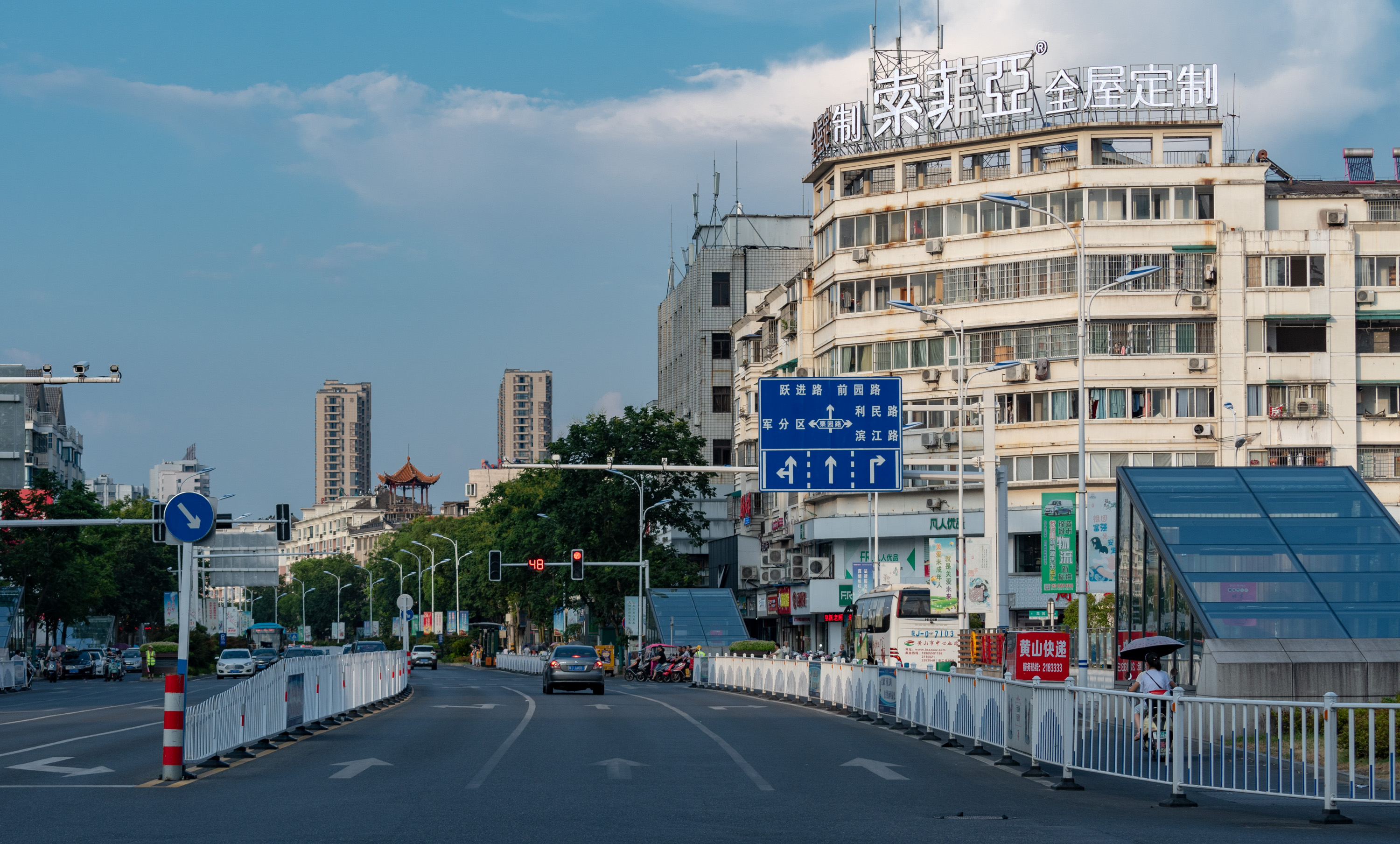
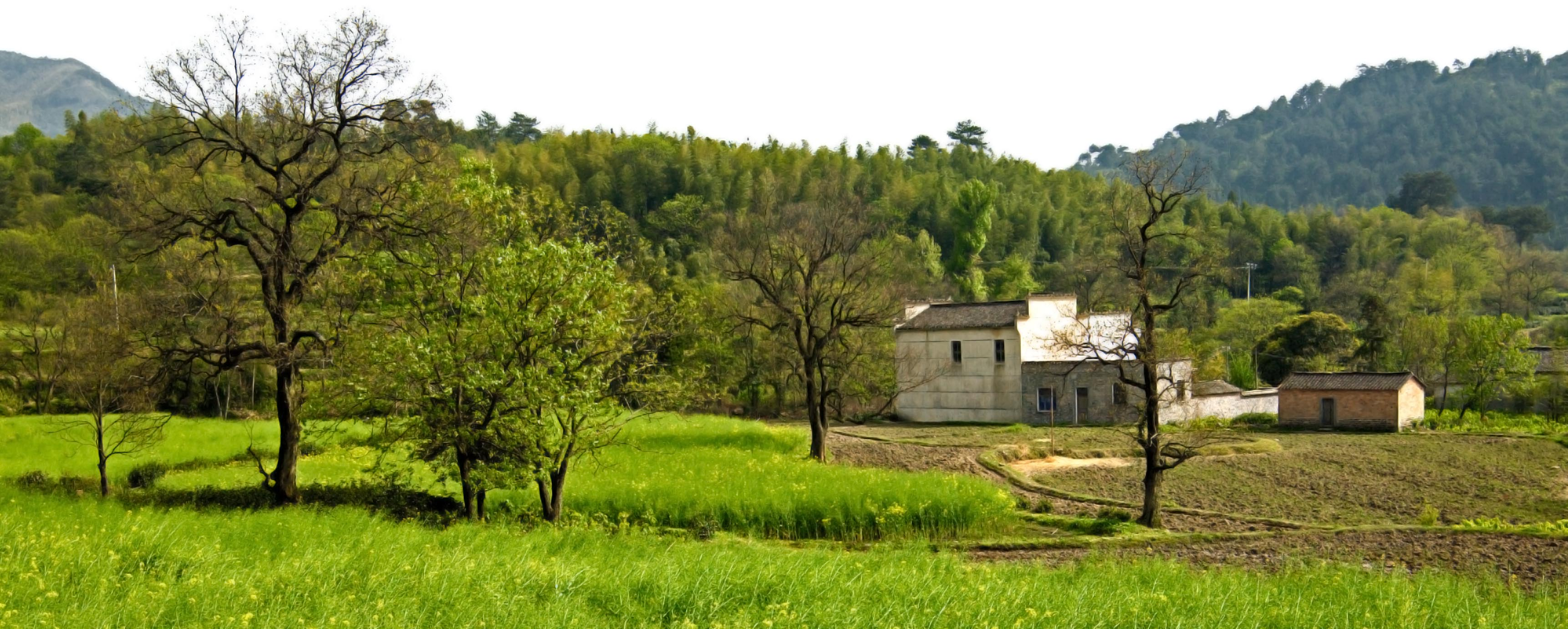
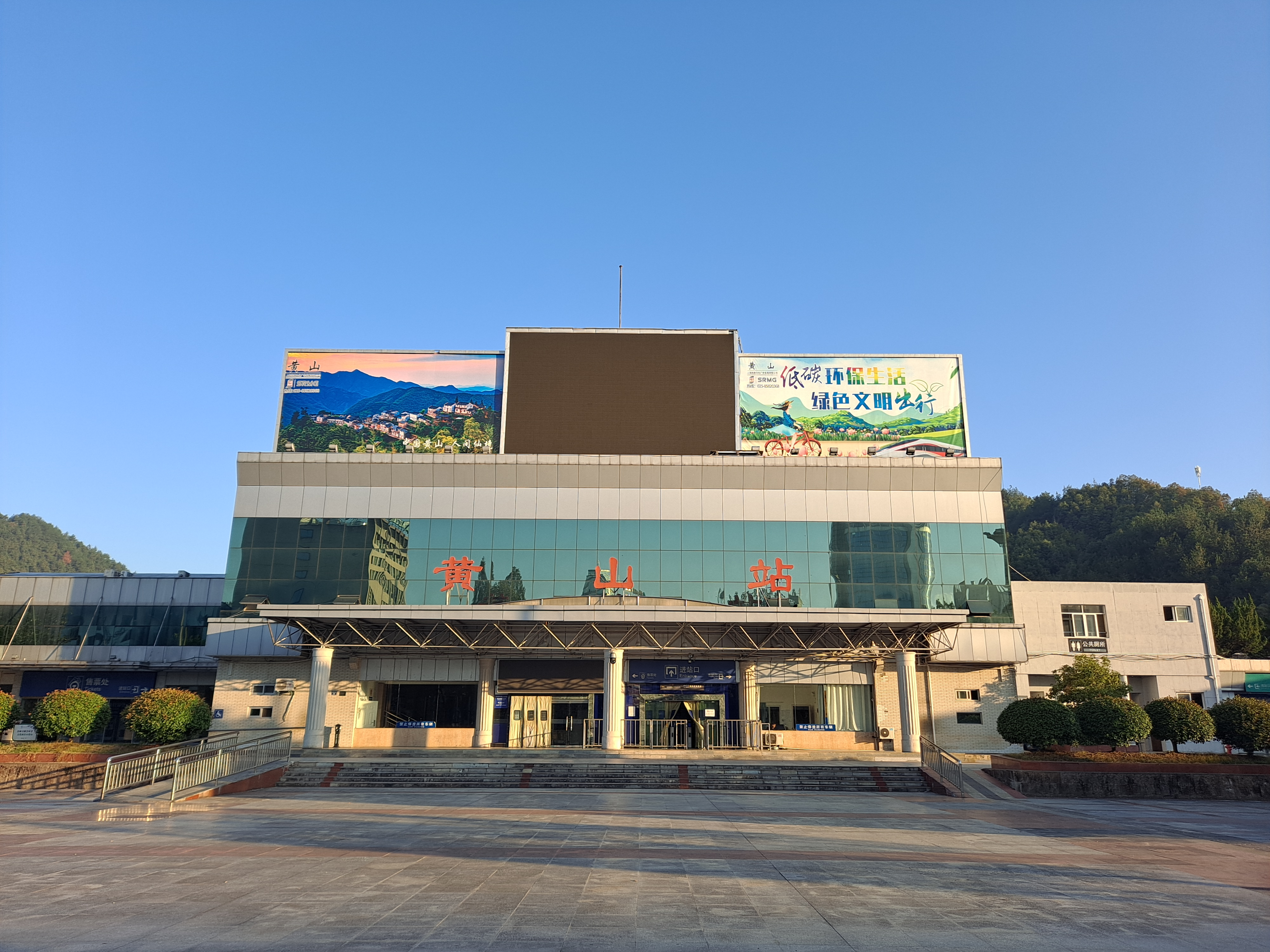
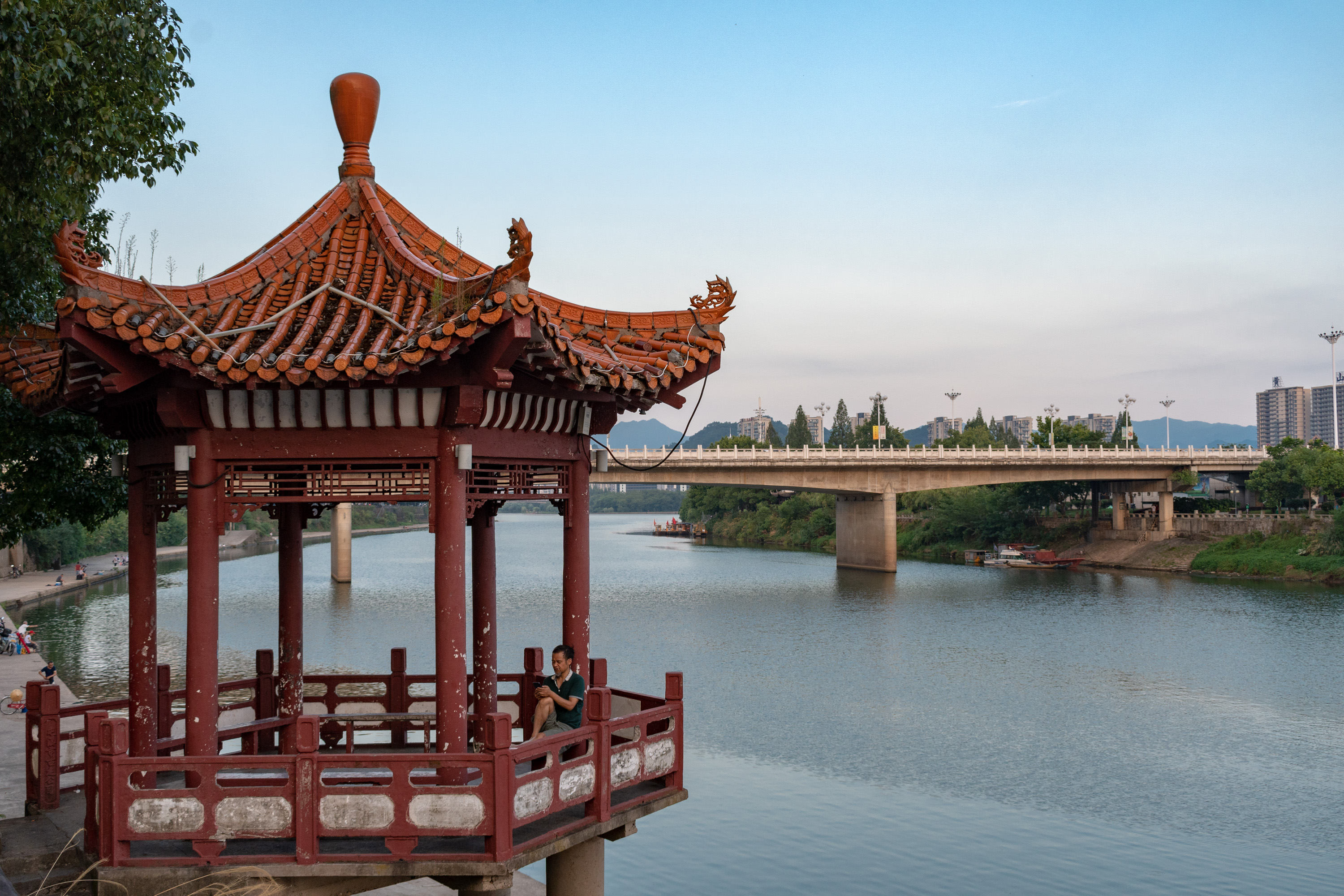
- Old town of Tunxi Downtown Village near a mountain Huangshan railway station Heng River

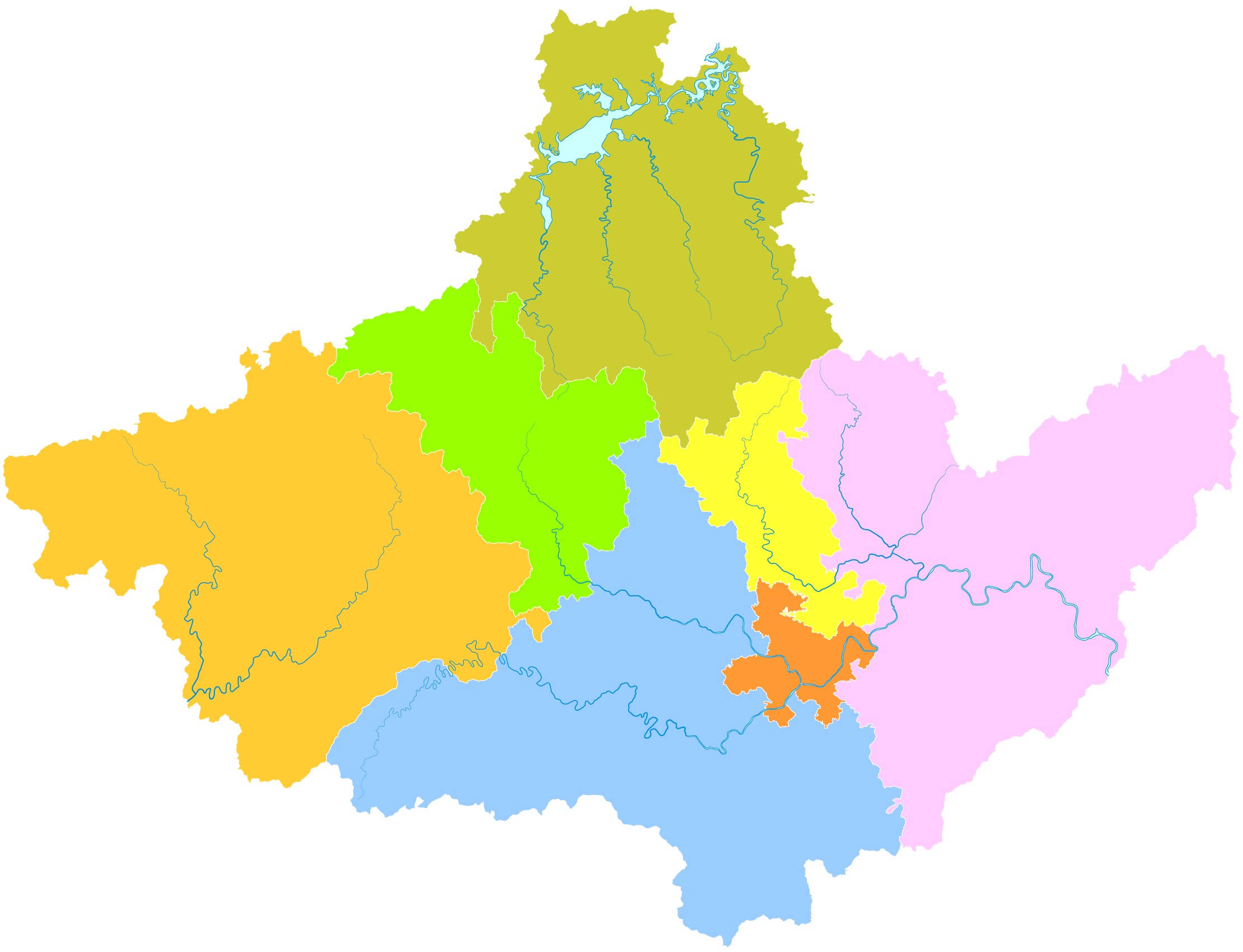
- Tunxi, seen in orange, within Huangshan
- Coordinates: 29°41′46″N 118°18′55″E
- Country: China
- Province: Anhui
- Prefecture-level city: Huangshan
- District seat: Yanghu

Area
  - Total: 191 km^{2} (74 sq mi)

Population (2020)
  - Total: 291,188
  - Density: 1,520/km^{2} (3,950/sq mi)
- Time zone: UTC+8 (China Standard)
- Postal code: 245000
- Website: www.ahtxq.gov.cn

Tunxi District (Chinese: 屯溪区; pinyin: Túnxī Qū) is the central district and the administrative seat of Huangshan City, Anhui Province, eastern China.

It has a population of 217,637 (2010) and an area of 249 square kilometres (96 sq mi). Tunxi District has jurisdiction over four subdistricts and five towns.

The most well-known tourist spot is the Old Town, although Tunxi is also close to the Huangshan Mountain Range and Hongcun Village, both of which are World Heritage Sites.

== History ==
In the late Eastern Han Dynasty (208 AD), Sun Quan, the ruler of Sun Wu, established Liyang County (犁陽縣) in Tunxi, marking the beginning of Tunxi's administrative system. In 464, Liyang County was abolished and merged into Haining County (海寧, present-day Xiuning County). In 553, Liyang County was reestablished under Xinning Commandery.

On April 30, 1949, the 35th Division of the 12th Corps of the Second Field Army of the Chinese People's Liberation Army occupied Tunxi. On May 13, the Huizhou District was established, with Tunxi City established and the district government stationed in Tunxi. To promote local tourism economy, on November 27, 1987, the former Huizhou District was abolished and replaced by Huangshan City (same name as Huangshan), with Tunxi becoming a city district and the seat of the municipal government.

== Administrative divisions ==
Tunxi District is divided to 4 Subdistricts and 5 towns.

Subdistricts

- Yudong Subdistrict (昱东街道)
- Yuzhong Subdistrict (昱中街道)
- Yuxi Subdistrict (昱西街道)
- Laojie Subdistrict (老街街道)

Towns

- Tunguang (屯光镇)
- Liyang (黎阳镇)
- Yanghu (阳湖镇)
- Yiqi (奕棋镇)
- Xintan (新潭镇)

== Religion ==
Tunxi (or Tunki) is the seat of the Latin Catholic Apostolic prefecture (a pre-diocesan jurisdiction, not entitled to a Titular Bishop) of Tunxi / Tunkien(sis) (Latin adjective), which depends on the missionary Roman Congregation for the Evangelization of Peoples. It was established on 1937.02.22 on territory split off from the then Apostolic Vicariate of Wuhu (now a Diocese). No statistics available. It has been vacant indefinitely without Apostolic administrator (possibly dormant) since the death of its only incumbent:

- Father José Fogued y Gil (扶植義), Claretians (C.M.F., April 24, 1937- January 24, 1954)

== Transportation ==
=== Roads and expressways ===
- G56 Hangzhou–Ruili Expressway
- G3 Beijing–Taipei Expressway
- China National Highway 205

=== Railway ===
- Huangshan North railway station on
  - Hefei–Fuzhou high-speed railway
  - Hangzhou–Nanchang high-speed railway
  - Chizhou–Huangshan high-speed railway
- Huangshan railway station on
  - Anhui–Jiangxi railway

=== Airport ===
- Huangshan Tunxi International Airport

== Sources and external links ==
- GCatholic - Apostolic prefecture

Specific
