= Anhui–Jiangxi railway =

Railway line in China

Anhui–Jiangxi railway 皖赣铁路
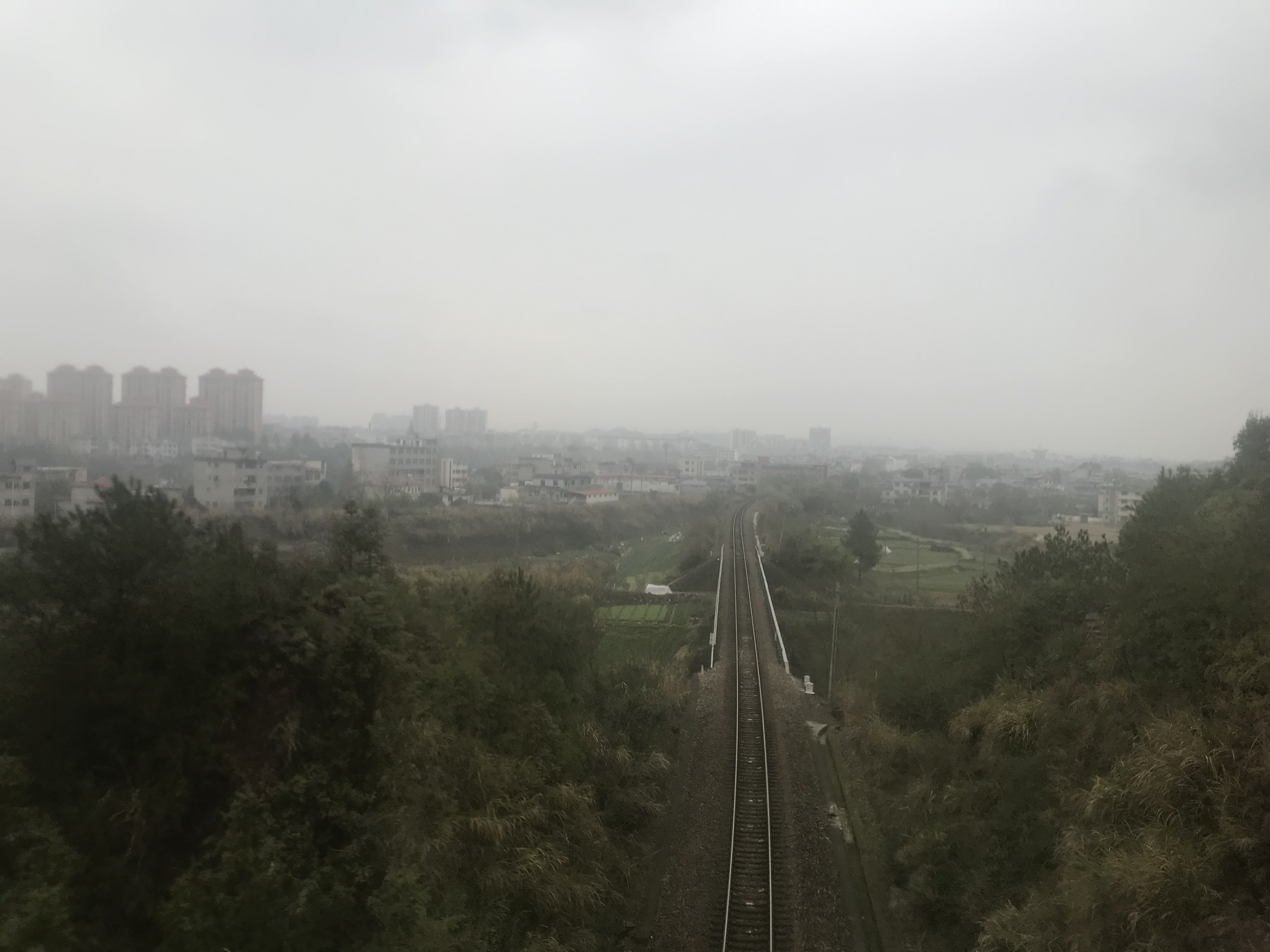
- Between Jingdezhen and Fuliang

Overview
- Other name: Wan'gan railway
- Status: Operational
- Locale: China: Anhui; Jiangxi
- Termini: Wuhu; Yingtan
- Stations: 24

Service
- Type: Heavy rail
- System: China Railway

Technical
- Line length: 570 km (354 mi)
- Track gauge: 1,435 mm (4 ft 8 1/2 in)
- Operating speed: 120 km/h (75 mph)

The Anhui–Jiangxi railway or Wan'gan railway (simplified Chinese: 皖赣铁路; traditional Chinese: 皖贛鐵路; pinyin: wǎn gàn tiělù), is a single-track railroad in eastern China between Wuhu in southern Anhui Province and Guixi in northern Jiangxi Province. The line is 551 km (342 mi) long and was built between 1905 and 1985. Cities along route include Wuhu, Xuancheng, Ningguo, Jixi, She County, Huangshan City, Xiuning, Yi County, and Qimen in Anhui Province and Jingdezhen, Leping, Wannian and Guixi in Jiangxi Province.

The railway, known in Chinese as the Wan'gan line, is named after the Chinese shorthand names for the two provinces through which it traverses, Wan for Anhui and Gan for Jiangxi. Points of interest along the line include UNESCO World Heritage Sites Huangshan and the ancient villages of Hongcun and Xidi of southern Anhui as well as China's porcelain capital, Jingdezhen.

== Line Description ==
In the north, the Anhui–Jiangxi railway, begins in Wuhu, at the junction with the Nanjing–Tongling railway. The railway follows a southeasterly course through Xuancheng to Ningguo and then turns to a southwesterly course through Jixi and She County to Huangshan City. From Huangshan, also known as Tunxi, the railway runs due west through Xiuning, Yuting, and Qimen before entering into Jiangxi Province and proceeding south to Jingdezhen, Leping, Wannian and Guixi. At Guixi, the line joins the Zhejiang–Jiangxi railway.

== History ==
The Anhui–Jiangxi (Wan'gan) railway was planned and built, on and off, over more than 80 years.

=== Qing Dynasty and Republic of China ===
During the late Qing Dynasty, the Anhui Provincial Private Railway Company, a joint-stock company supported by Anhui merchants, proposed the building of a rail line from Wuhu to Jingdezhen. In 1904, the company raised two million taels of silver and hired a Norwegian and a Japanese engineer to oversee the project. Construction began in 1905 but the project ran out of funds in April 1911, after completing 32 kilometres (20 mi) of roadbed and bridges from Wuhu to the township of Wanzhi.

In 1914, the Beijing-based Beiyang Government of the Republic of China approved a proposal by another group of investors to build the Nanjing–Hunan railway with British bank financing and sold the right to build the Wan'gan railway along with the partially finished section for 1 million taels of silver. The outbreak of World War I prevented further financing for the project.

In 1932, a group of Shanghai-based investors, with the approval of the Nanjing-based Nationalist government of the Republic of China formed the Jiangnan Railway Company to resume construction of the Wuhu–Xuancheng railway. The government sold the existing roadbed and bridgework to the Jiangnan Company for 360,000 silver dollars. Construction began in March 1933 and the section to Sunjiabu Township in Xuancheng opened for service in 1934.

In May 1936, work began on both ends of the railway from Xuancheng in the north and Guixi in the south and track-laying began in the latter half of 1937, but was halted in November by the Second Sino-Japanese War. In November 1937, Japanese forces captured Nanjing. In the summer of 1938, the Nationalist government dismantled the railway and moved building materials to southwest China. The Japanese after capturing Wuhu, rebuilt the demolished Wanzhi Bridge and resumed rail service between Wuhu and Xuancheng for a year, but the bridge was later washed away by floods.

After the end of World War II, the Nationalist government moved material for the railway to Northeast China for the civil war with the Communists.

=== People's Republic of China ===
After the founding of the People's Republic in 1949, the Wangan railway project was studied three times by the government in 1956, 1958 and 1959. Work began in September 1958 and July 1961 but in each instance was halted after a short time due economic dislocations caused by the Great Leap Forward. Full-scale construction resumed in 1970 under separate leadership of Jiangxi and Anhui. A State Council order to reduce the scale of infrastructure development forced planners to slow the pace of construction.

Full-scale construction resumed again on July 1, 1974, but within one year, the project ran into shortages of steel, cement and lumber. In 1975, some of the railway engineers were transferred to the rebuilding of the Tianjin–Pukou railway. The remaining project engineers were divided by political infighting incited by the Gang of Four's Anti-Confucius, Anti-Lin Biao campaign of the Cultural Revolution. Rebel factions within the engineering corps effectively halted work. In October 1976, after the Gang of Four was ousted, the reconstituted Anhui Provincial Party Committee organized 200 recalcitrant members of the rebel faction for three months of political study and self-criticism, and adjusted the leadership personnel of the construction effort.

After the Third Plenary Session of the 11th CPC Central Committee in 1978, which affirmed the course of the reform and opening up, construction on the Wan'gan Line was pursued with renewed vigor. CPC Party Secretary Hu Yaobang, Anhui Party Secretary Wan Li, and each of the Railway Ministers after 1978, visited the construction site to give their personal support. Track-laying on the Anhui–Jiangxi railway was completed in 1982 and full-scale commercial service began in 1985.

=== Capacity expansion ===
In October 2013, the Ministry of Land Resources approved a plan to expand capacity of the Wuhu to Xuancheng section of the Wan'gan railway to accommodate trains at speeds of up to 250 km/h (160 mph). The 73.3 km (45.5 mi) section would contain four stations and require investment of Y8.99 billion. Travel time between the two cities would be reduced to 20 minutes.

== Stations on the line ==
Stations listed from Anhui to Jiangxi

Station name	Chinese name	Distance (km)	Rail Connection
Wuhu	芜湖	550	Nanjing–Tongling railway, Shangqiu–Hangzhou railway
Xuancheng	宣城	486	Xuancheng–Hangzhou railway, Shangqiu–Hangzhou railway
Ningguo	宁国	441	
Jixi County	绩溪县	354	
She County	歙县	326	
Huangshan City (Tunxi)	黄山市 (屯溪)	304	
Xiuning	休宁	286	
Yi County, Anhui (Yuting)	黟县 (渔亭)	264	
Qimen	祁门	238	
Jingdezhen	景德镇	137	Jiujiang–Jingdezhen–Quzhou railway
Leping	乐平市	89	
Wannian	万年	57	
Guixi	贵溪	0	Shanghai–Kunming railway

== See also ==
- List of railways in China
