= Wannian County =

Wannian 万年县 Wannien
- County
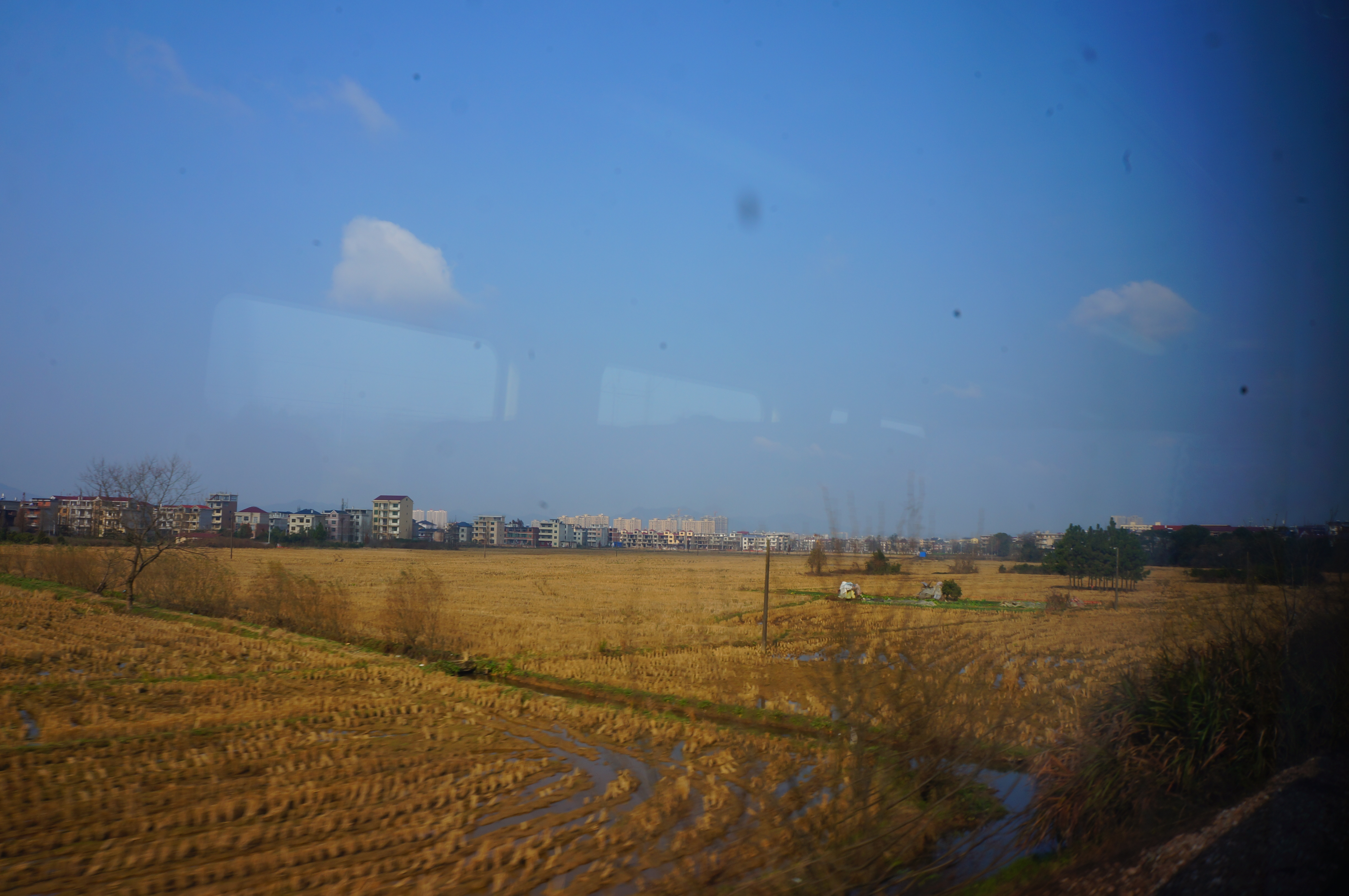

- Location in Jiangxi
- Coordinates: 28°41′41″N 117°03′30″E
- Country: People's Republic of China
- Province: Jiangxi
- Prefecture-level city: Shangrao

Area
  - Total: 1,140.76 km^{2} (440.45 sq mi)

Population (2017)
  - Total: 435,700
  - Density: 381.9/km^{2} (989.2/sq mi)
- Time zone: UTC+8 (China Standard)
- Postal code: 335500

Wannian (simplified Chinese: 万年县; traditional Chinese: 萬年縣; pinyin: Wànnián Xiàn; lit. 'Ten thousand years') is a county in the northeast of Jiangxi province, China. It is under the jurisdiction of the prefecture-level city of Shangrao.

Its total area is 1,140.76 km^{2} (440.45 sq mi). Its 2003 population was 361,000.

Wannian County comprises 6 towns and 9 townships.

The county seat and largest population center is Chenying Town (陈营镇). The second largest population center and former county seat is Qingyun Town (青云镇), formerly Chengguan Town (城关镇).

In addition to farming, pearl and concrete production are economically important. There is limited mining.

The local dialect, Wannianese, is a dialect of the Gan Chinese language.

== Administrative divisions ==
At present, Wannian County has 6 towns and 6 townships.

6 towns

- Chenying (陈营镇)
- Shizhen (石镇镇)
- Qingyun (青云镇)
- Zibu (梓埠镇)
- Dayuan (大源镇)
- Peimei (裴梅镇)

6 townships

- Huyun (湖云乡)
- Qibu (齐埠乡)
- Wangjia (汪家乡)
- Shangfang (上坊乡)
- Suqiao (苏桥乡)
- Zhutian (珠田乡)

== Climate ==
Climate data for Wannian, elevation 56 m (184 ft), (1991–2020 normals, extremes 1981–2010)
Month	Jan	Feb	Mar	Apr	May	Jun	Jul	Aug	Sep	Oct	Nov	Dec	Year
Record high °C (°F)	26.2 (79.2)	29.2 (84.6)	33.8 (92.8)	35.1 (95.2)	36.4 (97.5)	37.5 (99.5)	41.2 (106.2)	39.9 (103.8)	38.4 (101.1)	36.8 (98.2)	32.3 (90.1)	25.4 (77.7)	41.2 (106.2)
Mean daily maximum °C (°F)	10.4 (50.7)	13.4 (56.1)	17.4 (63.3)	23.6 (74.5)	28.1 (82.6)	30.5 (86.9)	34.4 (93.9)	34.0 (93.2)	30.6 (87.1)	25.5 (77.9)	19.4 (66.9)	13.1 (55.6)	23.4 (74.1)
Daily mean °C (°F)	5.9 (42.6)	8.5 (47.3)	12.4 (54.3)	18.3 (64.9)	23.0 (73.4)	26.0 (78.8)	29.5 (85.1)	28.9 (84.0)	25.2 (77.4)	19.5 (67.1)	13.4 (56.1)	7.6 (45.7)	18.2 (64.7)
Mean daily minimum °C (°F)	3.0 (37.4)	5.2 (41.4)	8.9 (48.0)	14.5 (58.1)	19.1 (66.4)	22.7 (72.9)	25.6 (78.1)	25.1 (77.2)	21.3 (70.3)	15.4 (59.7)	9.5 (49.1)	4.1 (39.4)	14.5 (58.2)
Record low °C (°F)	−6.3 (20.7)	−7.4 (18.7)	−2.9 (26.8)	2.0 (35.6)	9.7 (49.5)	13.7 (56.7)	19.2 (66.6)	19.7 (67.5)	12.6 (54.7)	2.0 (35.6)	−2.4 (27.7)	−12.8 (9.0)	−12.8 (9.0)
Average precipitation mm (inches)	99.3 (3.91)	109.9 (4.33)	210.2 (8.28)	244.8 (9.64)	243.2 (9.57)	351.0 (13.82)	203.1 (8.00)	138.8 (5.46)	61.2 (2.41)	51.5 (2.03)	96.9 (3.81)	73.7 (2.90)	1,883.6 (74.16)
Average precipitation days (≥ 0.1 mm)	14.7	14.1	18.3	16.9	16.0	16.9	11.2	12.0	7.7	7.7	10.0	10.9	156.4
Average snowy days	2.3	1.4	0.3	0	0	0	0	0	0	0	0	0.8	4.8
Average relative humidity (%)	83	82	82	80	80	83	76	78	78	77	81	81	80
Mean monthly sunshine hours	84.4	87.1	99.2	121.9	147.0	138.9	234.0	220.6	189.3	168.2	135.4	123.3	1,749.3
Percentage possible sunshine	26	27	27	32	35	33	55	55	52	48	42	39	39
Source: China Meteorological Administration

== Tourist attractions ==
Wannian is the location of the Xianren Cave (Fairy Cave), where historically important finds have been made of ancient pottery shards and rice grains.

== Transportation ==
=== Rail ===
Wannian is served by the Anhui–Jiangxi Railway.
