= Huangshan Tunxi International Airport =

Airport serving Huangshan City, Anhui, China

Huangshan Tunxi International Airport 黄山屯溪国际机场
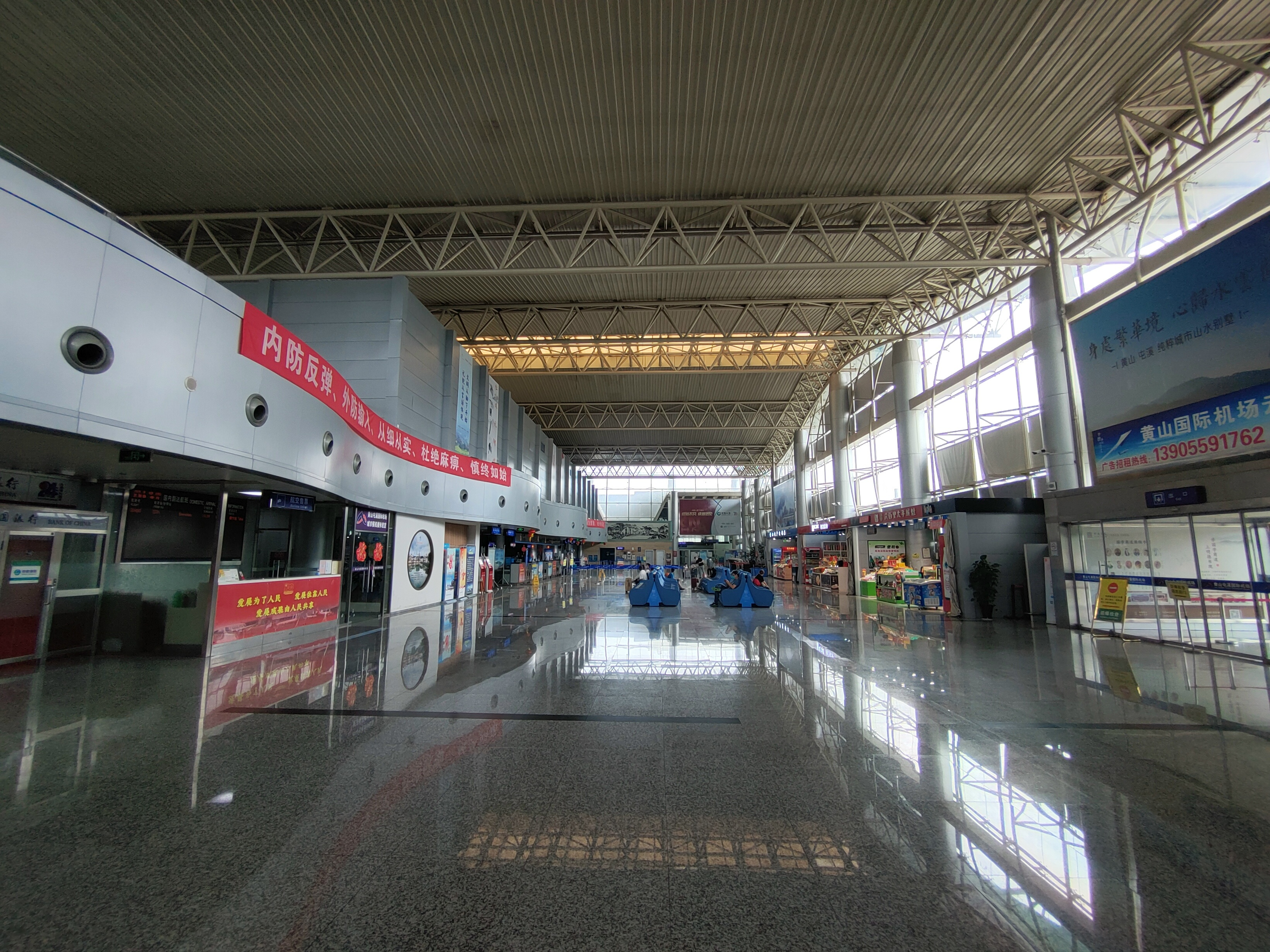
- IATA: TXN; ICAO: ZSTX

Summary
- Airport type: Public
- Serves: Huangshan City
- Location: Tunxi District, Huangshan City, Anhui, China
- Opened: October 1959; 66 years ago
- Elevation AMSL: 134 m (440 ft)
- Coordinates: 29°43′48″N 118°15′10″E
- Website: www.hsairport.com

Map
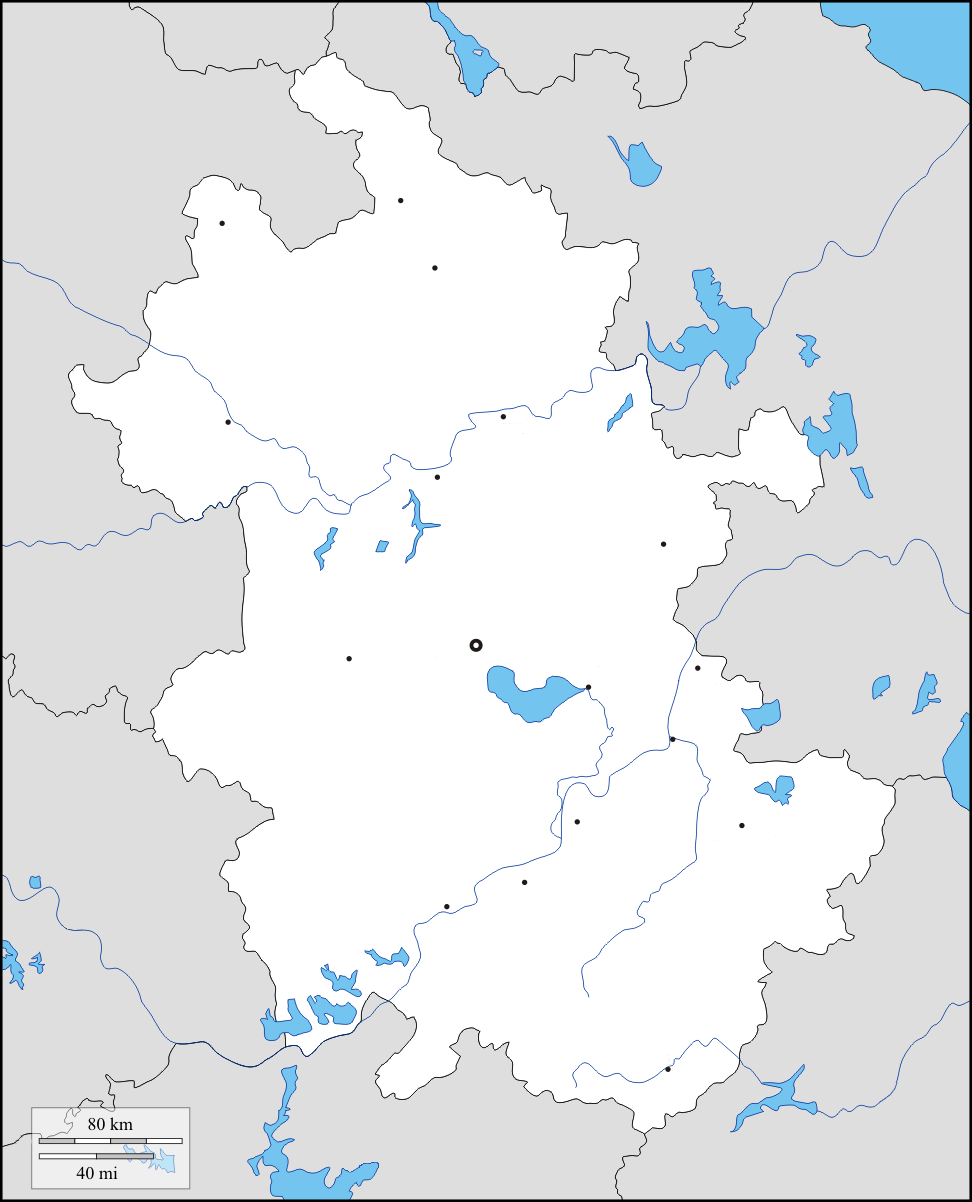
- Location in Anhui TXN/ZSTX (China)

Runways
Direction	Length		Surface
Direction	m	ft	Surface
13/31	2,600	8,530	Concrete

Statistics (2025)
- Passengers: 318,012
- Aircraft movements: 9,403
- Cargo (metric tons): 711.8

Huangshan Tunxi International Airport
- Simplified Chinese: 黄山屯溪国际机场
- Traditional Chinese: 黃山屯溪國際機場
Transcriptions
Standard Mandarin
- Hanyu Pinyin: Huángshān Túnxī Guójì Jīchǎng

Huangshan Tunxi International Airport (IATA: TXN, ICAO: ZSTX) is an airport in Tunxi District, Huangshan City in East China's Anhui province. It mainly serves tourists to Mount Huangshan, one of China's top tourist destinations. The airport was first built in 1958 and has one 2,600-meter runway.

== History ==
Huangshan Tunxi International Airport was formerly known as Tunxi Airport and Huangshan Tunxi Airport.

Tunxi Airport was built in 1958 and could accommodate A-320, MD-90, B757 and smaller aircraft. A 600-meter-long dirt and gravel runway, and simple communication and navigation facilities were built, and the main aircraft operated by the An-2 type aircraft were constructed. The airport was opened to traffic in October 1959. On November 11, 1959, the first route from Hefei to Wuhu to Tunxi was opened to traffic.

After its initial construction, the airport underwent five expansions and renovations.

In 1966, Tunxi Airport underwent its first simple expansion, extending the runway to 1200 meters with a gravel surface, capable of handling Il-14 aircraft.

The airport underwent its second expansion in 1980, including the construction of a new terminal building and two navigation towers. The runway was extended to 1800 meters, still with a gravel surface, and was capable of handling An-24 aircraft.

In 1987, to accommodate the development of tourism in Huangshan, Tunxi Airport underwent its third expansion, with a 2,200-meter concrete runway built to 4C standards, and equipped with facilities such as an instrument landing system and night-flight lighting. Because the expansion project was very thorough, including converting the original gravel runway into a 2,200-meter-long concrete runway and comprehensively upgrading communication, navigation, and navigation lighting facilities, the airport could not maintain normal takeoffs and landings. Therefore, the project was carried out by closing the airport. The project was completed in 1989, and the airport resumed operation, becoming capable of handling mainstream medium-sized passenger aircraft such as the Boeing 737 and McDonnell Douglas MD-82. In 1989, the airport reopened and was renamed Huangshan Tunxi Airport.

In July 2000, the airport began its fourth expansion according to 4D standards, extending the runway to 2,600 meters and increasing its width from 50 meters to 60 meters. On May 11, 2004, the airport terminal expansion project successfully passed the preliminary acceptance inspection, and was officially completed on May 28, 2004.

The latest upgrade project was the 4D upgrade project for Huangshan Tunxi Airport. The project was carried out in two phases, officially launched at the end of 2008 and finally completed in early 2018.

In August 2009, the State Council approved the expansion of Huangshan's air port to foreign trade. On July 28, 2011, the first regular international flight route between Huangshan and Seoul officially opened. On June 30, 2014, the Civil Aviation Administration of China approved the renaming of "Huangshan Tunxi Airport" to "Huangshan Tunxi International Airport".

== Airlines and destinations ==
=== Passenger ===
Airlines	Destinations
9 Air	Guangzhou, Shenyang
Air China	Beijing–Capital
Batik Air Malaysia	Charter: Kuala Lumpur–International
Beijing Capital Airlines	Xiamen, Xi'an
Fuzhou Airlines	Harbin, Sanya

== Controversies ==
According to reports from CCTV, taxicabs in Huangshan Airport price themselves out of the market without using the meters legally, and other taxis in downtown Huangshan are rejected for taking passengers.

== See also ==
- List of airports in China
