= Leping =

Leping 乐平市 Loping
- County-level city
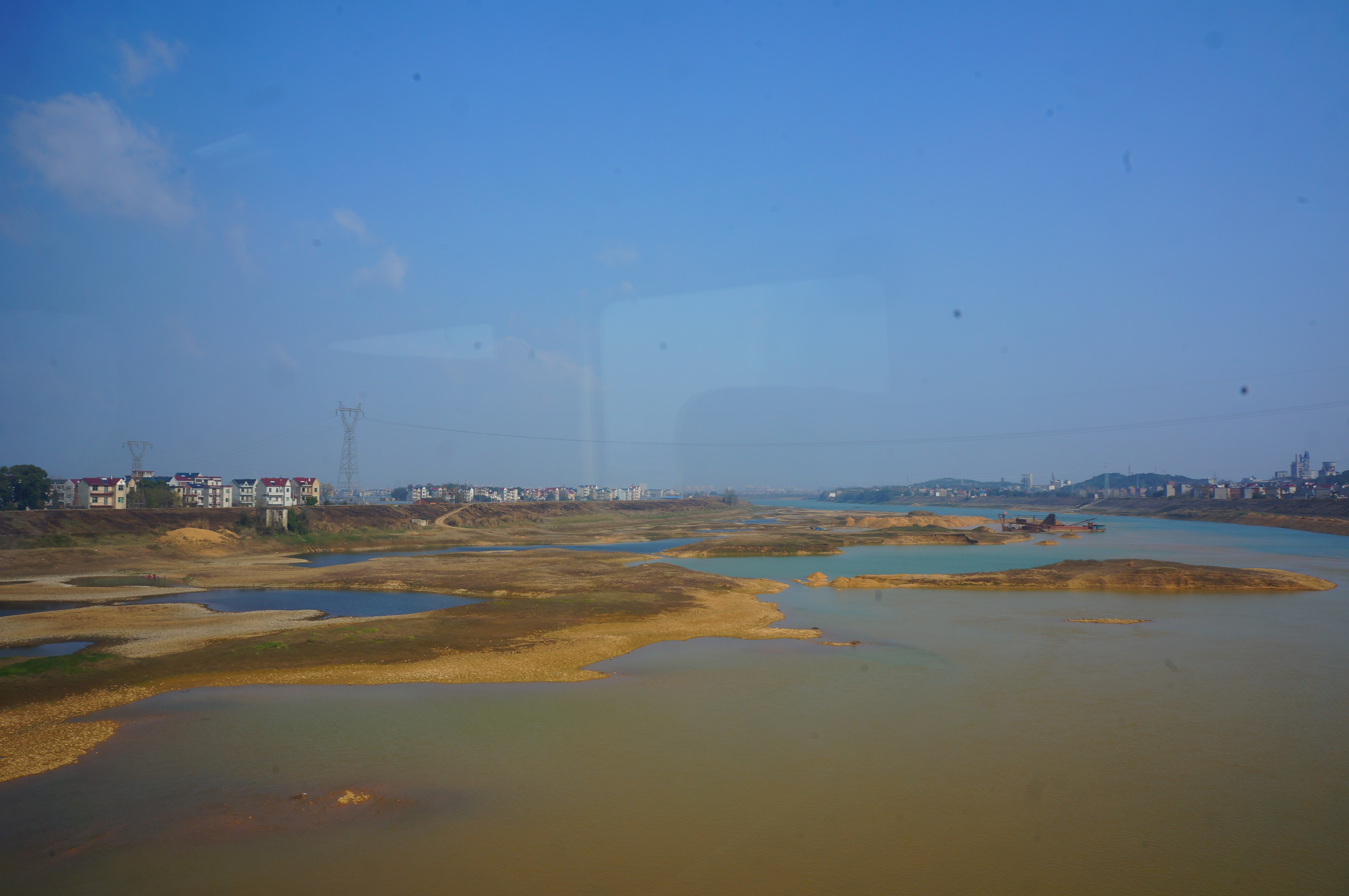
- Interactive map of Leping
- Coordinates (government): 28°58′41″N 117°09′07″E
- Country: People's Republic of China
- Province: Jiangxi
- Prefecture-level city: Jingdezhen

Area
  - Total: 1,973 km^{2} (762 sq mi)

Population
  - Total: 852,800
  - Density: 432.2/km^{2} (1,119/sq mi)
- 2018
- Time zone: UTC+8 (China Standard)
- Postal code: 333300

Leping (simplified Chinese: 乐平; traditional Chinese: 樂平; pinyin: Lèpíng) is a county-level city in the northeast of Jiangxi province, China. It is under the administration of the prefecture-level city of Jingdezhen.

== Administrative divisions ==
Leping City has 2 subdistricts, 14 towns and 2 townships.

2 subdistricts

- Jiyang (洎阳街道)
- Tashan (塔山街道)

14 towns

- Zhenqiao (镇桥镇)
- Legang (乐港镇)
- Yongshan (涌山镇)
- Zhongbu (众埠镇)
- Andu (按渡镇)
- Hongyan (洪岩镇)
- Lilin (礼林镇)
- Hougang (后港镇)
- Taqian (塔前镇)
- Shuangtian (双田镇)
- Lingang (临港镇)
- Gaojia (高家镇)
- Mingkou (名口镇)
- Wukou (浯口镇)

2 townships

- Luci (鸬鹚乡)
- Shiligang (十里岗乡)

== Transportation ==
=== Rail ===
Leping is served by the Anhui–Jiangxi Railway.

== Climate ==
Climate data for Leping, elevation 51 m (167 ft), (1991–2020 normals, extremes 1981–2010)
Month	Jan	Feb	Mar	Apr	May	Jun	Jul	Aug	Sep	Oct	Nov	Dec	Year
Record high °C (°F)	25.0 (77.0)	28.6 (83.5)	33.9 (93.0)	35.1 (95.2)	36.3 (97.3)	37.5 (99.5)	40.8 (105.4)	40.4 (104.7)	38.3 (100.9)	37.3 (99.1)	32.0 (89.6)	24.8 (76.6)	40.8 (105.4)
Mean daily maximum °C (°F)	10.5 (50.9)	13.5 (56.3)	17.5 (63.5)	23.6 (74.5)	28.1 (82.6)	30.4 (86.7)	34.2 (93.6)	34.1 (93.4)	30.8 (87.4)	25.9 (78.6)	19.7 (67.5)	13.3 (55.9)	23.5 (74.2)
Daily mean °C (°F)	6.0 (42.8)	8.7 (47.7)	12.5 (54.5)	18.4 (65.1)	23.1 (73.6)	26.1 (79.0)	29.6 (85.3)	29.1 (84.4)	25.5 (77.9)	20.1 (68.2)	13.8 (56.8)	7.9 (46.2)	18.4 (65.1)
Mean daily minimum °C (°F)	3.0 (37.4)	5.3 (41.5)	9.0 (48.2)	14.4 (57.9)	19.2 (66.6)	22.7 (72.9)	25.7 (78.3)	25.2 (77.4)	21.5 (70.7)	15.8 (60.4)	9.8 (49.6)	4.2 (39.6)	14.7 (58.4)
Record low °C (°F)	−6.2 (20.8)	−8.6 (16.5)	−4.8 (23.4)	3.3 (37.9)	9.6 (49.3)	14.5 (58.1)	19.6 (67.3)	19.9 (67.8)	12.7 (54.9)	2.4 (36.3)	−2.2 (28.0)	−13.4 (7.9)	−13.4 (7.9)
Average precipitation mm (inches)	102.2 (4.02)	121.3 (4.78)	209.5 (8.25)	244.6 (9.63)	251.8 (9.91)	341.9 (13.46)	203.0 (7.99)	149.2 (5.87)	63.6 (2.50)	57.1 (2.25)	90.1 (3.55)	67.6 (2.66)	1,901.9 (74.87)
Average precipitation days (≥ 0.1 mm)	14.5	13.7	17.6	16.8	16.1	17.2	11.4	11.4	8.0	6.8	9.9	10.4	153.8
Average snowy days	2.1	1.1	0.4	0	0	0	0	0	0	0	0	0.6	4.2
Average relative humidity (%)	80	79	79	78	78	82	76	77	76	73	78	77	78
Mean monthly sunshine hours	84.8	90.4	102.1	129.5	156.6	141.0	233.0	225.8	191.1	170.5	132.6	117.7	1,775.1
Percentage possible sunshine	26	28	27	33	37	34	55	56	52	48	42	37	40
Source: China Meteorological Administration
