= Wang Dazhi =

Chinese educator

- 汪达之
- Born: April 21, 1903; Yi County, Anhui, China
- Died: March 27, 1980 (aged 76); Beijing, China
- Occupation: Educator
- Known for: Founder of Xin'an Traveling Group

Wang Dazhi (Chinese: 汪达之; pinyin: Wāng Dázhī; April 21, 1903 – March 27, 1980) was a Chinese educator.

== Biography ==
Wang Dazhi was born in Yi County, Anhui in 1903. He attended the Nanjing Xiaozhuang Normal College, which was founded by Tao Xingzhi. After graduating in 1928, Tao appointed him to be the principal of the Xin'an Primary School, a rural school in Huai'an, Jiangsu province that Tao had established, from 1928 to 1935.

In 1935, Wang Dazhi established the Xin'an Lüxing Tuan or Xin'an Traveling Group (新安旅行团) to test Tao Xingzhi's education philosophy of treating society as one's school and to advocate national salvation in the face of Japanese aggression. On October 10, 1935, Wang and 14 primary students left Huaian and began a 25,000 km journey that would take 17 years through 22 provinces and Hong Kong. Along the way, they held public rallies; showed films; held dramatic and dance performances; sang songs; wrote articles; and created artworks to advocate national salvation and anti-Japanese resistance. Their group expanded to several hundred youth members. They had no formal school structure but continued their education by teaching each other, inviting guest lecturers, and undertaking new activities such as filmmaking and choreography. Famous songwriters such as Wang Luobin, Tian Han and Nie Er wrote songs for them. Group members were invited to act in Cai Chusheng's films.

They also drew patronage from political and military leaders across party lines. Luminaries who lent support include Chen Guofu, Zhou Fohai, Feng Yuxiang, Jiang Qing, Tong Lin'ge, Zhao Dengyu, Fu Zuoyi, Ma Bufang, Wang Luobin, Zhu Shaoliang, Chen Cheng, Zhou Enlai, Guo Moruo, Tian Han, Bai Chongxi, Du Yuming, Li Jishen, Zhang Fakui, Li Kenong, Liao Chengzhi, Liu Shaoqi, Chen Yi, Zhang Aiping, Huang Kecheng, Su Yu, Rao Shushi and Zhu De. Tao Xingzhi recounted the group's exploits in his fundraising trips overseas.

Many of Wang's students in the Xin'an Traveling Group went on to become accomplished artists, musicians, writers, and leaders in the Chinese artistic world, including two past presidents of the China Academy of Art.

After the People's Republic of China was founded, Wang Dazhi first served as the president of Nanjing Xiaozhuang Normal College, his alma mater, which had been closed due to political reasons in 1930. He then moved to Beijing to become the deputy director of the Chinese Character Reform Committee (中国文字改革委员会) at the Ministry of Education and later to Hainan where he served as the Party Secretary of Guangdong College of Nationalities.

Wang died in Beijing in March 1980 and is buried near the Xin'an Primary School in Huaian.
