= Ningguo =

Coordinates: 30°37′36″N 118°59′10″E

Ningguo 宁国市 Ningkwo
- County-level city
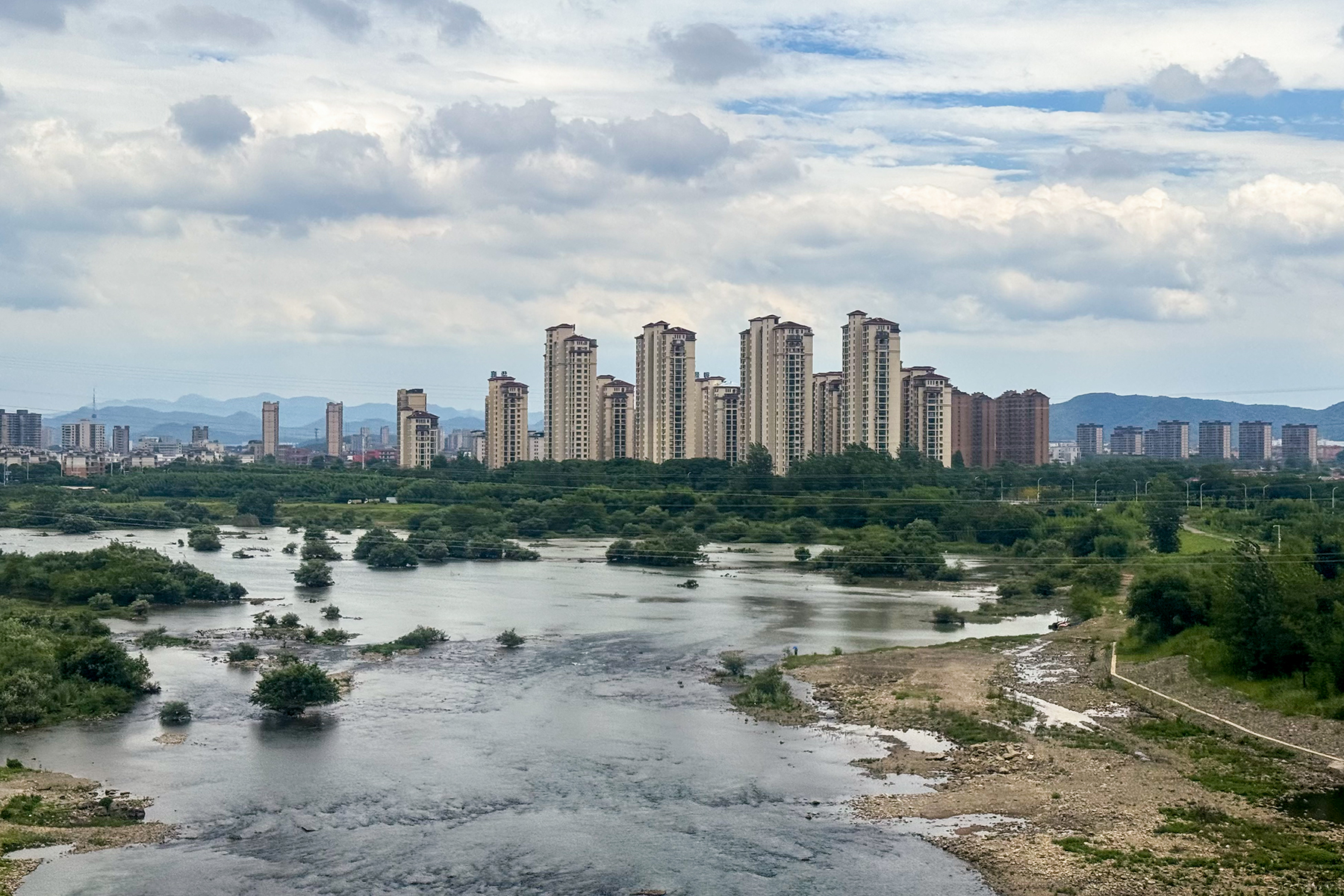
- Ningguo City and Xijin River in 2025
- Interactive map of Ningguo
- Country: People's Republic of China
- Province: Anhui
- Prefecture-level city: Xuancheng

Area
  - Total: 2,487 km^{2} (960 sq mi)

Population (2019)
  - Total: 399,000
- Time zone: UTC+8 (China Standard)
- Postal code: 242300

Ningguo (simplified Chinese: 宁国市; traditional Chinese: 寧國市; pinyin: Níngguó Shì) is a county-level city in the southeast of Anhui province, People's Republic of China, under the administration of Xuancheng City and bordering Zhejiang province to the south and east. It has a population of 380,000 and an area of 2,447 km^{2} (945 sq mi).

Ningguo has jurisdiction over eleven towns, seventeen townships, and one ethnic township.

== History ==
The name Ningguo is named from "Yi-QianGau". It is written, "首出庶物，万国咸宁". Ningguo was founded in 208 CE during the Eastern Han dynasty. Sun Quan divided the southern part of Wanling County into Ningguo and Huaian County.

On April 23, 1949, Ningguo County was occupied by the People's Liberation Army, and in May it was assigned to Xuancheng Prefecture. It became part of Huizhou Prefecture in January 1952, Wuhu Prefecture in February 1956, Huizhou Prefecture again in March 1961, and finally Xuancheng Prefecture in January 1980.

== Local culture ==
Anhui South Flower Drum Opera: Folk music originating in Hubei and Henan was introduced into Ningguo at the end of the Qing Dynasty. It was integrated with local songs and dances, absorbed the essence of Gaoqiang Opera, Hui opera and Peking opera, and formed a rough, simple and lively style. The main plays include "San Ci" and "San Fan", with a total of 53 major plays and 114 minor plays. After the founding of the People's Republic of China, 38 original plays and 83 small plays were collected and included in the compilation of traditional plays.

== Local dialects ==
The dialects of Ningguo are diverse, mainly including Hubei dialect, Anqing dialect, Wu dialect, and She dialect of the She ethnic group. This dialect diversity is mainly caused by the influx of a large number of foreign immigrants.

== Local specialties ==
- Walnut (山核桃)
- Dried bamboo shoots (竹笋干)
- Chinese chestnut (中国板栗)

Tea:

- Wild Orchid Fragrant Tea (野兰香茶)
- Yellow Flower Cloud Tip (黄花云尖)

== Demographics ==
The 2020 Chinese census shows that the permanent population of Ningguo City is 2500063, a decrease of 32875 people compared to 2532938 people in 2010 Chinese census, a decrease of 1.30%, and an average annual decrease of 0.13%.

Among the permanent residents of the city, the male population is 1284677, accounting for 51.39%; The female population is 1215386, accounting for 48.61%. The gender ratio of permanent residents (with 100 females and a male to female ratio) has increased from 105.11 in 2010 Chinese census to 105.70.

== Administrative divisions ==
Ningguo City is divided to 6 Subdistricts, 8 towns and 5 townships.

Subdistricts

- Xijin Subdistrict (西津街道)
- Heli Subdistrict (河沥街道)
- Nanshan Subdistrict (南山街道)
- Wangxi Subdistrict (汪溪街道)
- Zhufeng Subdistrict (竹峰街道)
- Tianhu Subdistrict (天湖街道)

Towns

- Zhongxi (中溪镇)
- Gangkou (港口镇)
- Ningdun (宁墩镇)
- Xiaxi (霞西镇)
- Xianxia (仙霞镇)
- Meilin (梅林镇)
- Jialu (甲路镇)
- Hule (胡乐镇)

Townships

- Yunti Township (云梯乡)
- Nanji Township (南极乡)
- Wanjia Township (万家乡)
- Qinglong Township (青龙乡)
- Fantang Township (方塘乡)

== Government ==
| Job | English name | Chinese name | Notes |
|---|---|---|---|
| Secretary of the Municipal Committee | Ni Zhiping | 倪志品 | |
| Mayors | Du Delin | 杜德林 | |
| Director of the Standing Committee of the Municipal People's Congress | Jin Qingwen | 金庆文 | |

== Climate ==
Ningguo City has a Humid subtropical climate. The climate is mild, rainfall is abundant, sunshine is still sufficient, and the four seasons are distinct. The temperature warms up early and unstable in spring, there are floods in late spring and early summer when precipitation is concentrated, there are droughts in summer, and it cools down quickly in autumn, often with autumn drizzle. The average annual temperature in Ningguo is 15.4 °C, the average annual precipitation is 1,426.9mm, and the annual frost-free period is 226 days.

Climate data for Ningguo, elevation 87 m (285 ft), (1991–2020 normals, extremes 1981–present)
| Month | Jan | Feb | Mar | Apr | May | Jun | Jul | Aug | Sep | Oct | Nov | Dec | Year |
|---|---|---|---|---|---|---|---|---|---|---|---|---|---|
| Record high °C (°F) | 26.8 (80.2) | 28.2 (82.8) | 34.3 (93.7) | 35.1 (95.2) | 37.1 (98.8) | 38.3 (100.9) | 40.8 (105.4) | 40.4 (104.7) | 38.6 (101.5) | 35.4 (95.7) | 31.0 (87.8) | 25.7 (78.3) | 40.8 (105.4) |
| Mean daily maximum °C (°F) | 8.5 (47.3) | 11.6 (52.9) | 16.5 (61.7) | 22.8 (73.0) | 27.4 (81.3) | 29.6 (85.3) | 33.4 (92.1) | 32.7 (90.9) | 28.5 (83.3) | 23.5 (74.3) | 17.5 (63.5) | 11.1 (52.0) | 21.9 (71.5) |
| Daily mean °C (°F) | 3.5 (38.3) | 6.0 (42.8) | 10.4 (50.7) | 16.4 (61.5) | 21.3 (70.3) | 24.6 (76.3) | 28.1 (82.6) | 27.4 (81.3) | 23.1 (73.6) | 17.3 (63.1) | 11.3 (52.3) | 5.4 (41.7) | 16.2 (61.2) |
| Mean daily minimum °C (°F) | −0.1 (31.8) | 1.9 (35.4) | 5.8 (42.4) | 11.2 (52.2) | 16.3 (61.3) | 20.6 (69.1) | 23.9 (75.0) | 23.6 (74.5) | 19.2 (66.6) | 13.0 (55.4) | 6.9 (44.4) | 1.3 (34.3) | 12.0 (53.5) |
| Record low °C (°F) | −10.1 (13.8) | −10.4 (13.3) | −5.6 (21.9) | −1.5 (29.3) | 6.7 (44.1) | 10.5 (50.9) | 17.2 (63.0) | 16.8 (62.2) | 8.0 (46.4) | 0.1 (32.2) | −6.1 (21.0) | −15.9 (3.4) | −15.9 (3.4) |
| Average precipitation mm (inches) | 82.6 (3.25) | 83.4 (3.28) | 132.4 (5.21) | 120.6 (4.75) | 139.8 (5.50) | 258.2 (10.17) | 205.7 (8.10) | 178.7 (7.04) | 100.5 (3.96) | 71.0 (2.80) | 66.1 (2.60) | 54.8 (2.16) | 1,493.8 (58.82) |
| Average precipitation days (≥ 0.1 mm) | 12.8 | 12.4 | 15.1 | 13.7 | 13.9 | 15.6 | 14.0 | 15.5 | 10.7 | 9.1 | 10.7 | 9.8 | 153.3 |
| Average snowy days | 4.8 | 3.2 | 1.1 | 0 | 0 | 0 | 0 | 0 | 0 | 0 | 0.4 | 2.0 | 11.5 |
| Average relative humidity (%) | 79 | 77 | 75 | 73 | 75 | 80 | 78 | 80 | 81 | 79 | 80 | 78 | 78 |
| Mean monthly sunshine hours | 100.4 | 105.6 | 126.8 | 148.4 | 165.1 | 135.6 | 194.0 | 179.8 | 141.8 | 148.5 | 128.6 | 118.8 | 1,693.4 |
| Percentage possible sunshine | 31 | 33 | 34 | 38 | 39 | 32 | 45 | 44 | 38 | 42 | 41 | 38 | 38 |
Source: China Meteorological Administration

== Transportation ==
=== Rail ===
Ningguo is served by the Anhui–Jiangxi Railway.

=== Civil aviation，international airports ===
Ningguo is about a 150-minute drive from Nanjing Lukou International Airport, and the Ningguo Terminal of Nanjing Lukou Airport has been opened; It is 120 minutes' drive from Hangzhou Xiaoshan International Airport, 90 minutes' drive from Mount Huangshan Airport, and 200 minutes' drive from Shanghai Hongqiao Airport and Hefei Xinqiao Airport. Ningguo Qinglongwan General Airport has started construction.

=== Ports and water transportation ===
The transportation time from Ningguo to Shanghai Port by container truck is about 4.5 hours, and the transportation time to Wuhu Port is 90 minutes.

In 2021, the added value of transportation, warehousing, and postal industries reached 1.99 billion yuan, an increase of 6.7% compared to the previous year at comparable prices. At the end of the year, the total number of civilian vehicles in the city was 102000, an increase of 8.1%, including 90000 private cars, an increase of 5.2%
