= Yi County, Anhui =

Yixian 黟县
- County
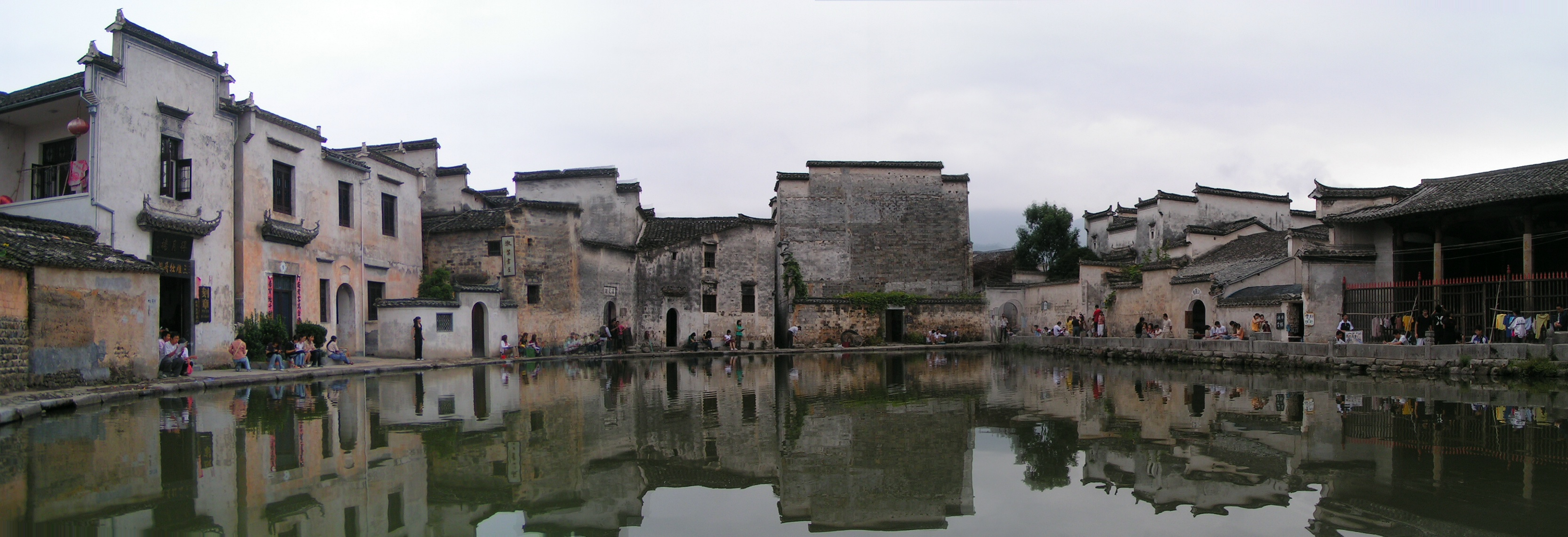
- The village of Hongcun, a UNESCO World Heritage Site in Yi County
- Interactive map of Yixian
- Coordinates: 29°55′29″N 117°56′18″E
- Country: China
- Province: Anhui
- Prefecture-level city: Huangshan
- County seat: Biyang

Area
  - Total: 857 km^{2} (331 sq mi)

Population (2020)
  - Total: 76,211
  - Density: 88.9/km^{2} (230/sq mi)
- Time zone: UTC+8 (China Standard)
- Postal code: 245500

Yi County or Yixian (simplified Chinese: 黟县; traditional Chinese: 黟縣; pinyin: Yī Xiàn) is a county in the southeast of Anhui Province, China, under the jurisdiction of Huangshan City. It has a population of 100,000 and an area of 847 square kilometres (327 sq mi). The government of Yi County is located in Biyang Town. The villages of Xidi and Hongcun in Yi County are part of the World Heritage Sites.

Yi County has jurisdiction over three towns and nine townships.

== History ==
During the 16th century, Yi County flourished, and thousands of buildings in the style of Ming Dynasty were built. These buildings are used extensively by the Chinese film industry. Scenes from the well known film Crouching Tiger, Hidden Dragon (2000) were filmed in Yi County.

== Administrative divisions ==
Yi County is divided to 5 towns and 3 townships.

Towns

- Biyang (碧阳镇)
- Hongcun (宏村镇)
- Yuting (渔亭镇)
- Xidi (西递镇)
- Kecun (柯村镇)

Townships

- Meixi Township (美溪乡)
- Hongtan Township (宏潭乡)
- Hongxing Township (洪星乡)

== Climate ==
Climate data for Yixian, elevation 228 m (748 ft), (1991–2020 normals, extremes 1981–2010)
Month	Jan	Feb	Mar	Apr	May	Jun	Jul	Aug	Sep	Oct	Nov	Dec	Year
Record high °C (°F)	22.8 (73.0)	27.6 (81.7)	33.6 (92.5)	33.0 (91.4)	34.4 (93.9)	36.1 (97.0)	38.3 (100.9)	38.9 (102.0)	37.8 (100.0)	35.6 (96.1)	29.7 (85.5)	22.8 (73.0)	38.9 (102.0)
Mean daily maximum °C (°F)	9.4 (48.9)	12.1 (53.8)	16.4 (61.5)	22.4 (72.3)	26.8 (80.2)	29.0 (84.2)	32.4 (90.3)	32.4 (90.3)	29.1 (84.4)	24.2 (75.6)	18.2 (64.8)	12.0 (53.6)	22.0 (71.7)
Daily mean °C (°F)	4.2 (39.6)	6.7 (44.1)	10.7 (51.3)	16.4 (61.5)	21.1 (70.0)	24.2 (75.6)	27.2 (81.0)	26.8 (80.2)	23.2 (73.8)	17.7 (63.9)	11.7 (53.1)	5.9 (42.6)	16.3 (61.4)
Mean daily minimum °C (°F)	0.7 (33.3)	2.9 (37.2)	6.5 (43.7)	11.8 (53.2)	16.8 (62.2)	20.9 (69.6)	23.5 (74.3)	23.1 (73.6)	19.0 (66.2)	13.1 (55.6)	7.2 (45.0)	1.8 (35.2)	12.3 (54.1)
Record low °C (°F)	−8.9 (16.0)	−8.3 (17.1)	−5.8 (21.6)	0.1 (32.2)	7.3 (45.1)	12.1 (53.8)	18.1 (64.6)	17.2 (63.0)	8.9 (48.0)	−0.1 (31.8)	−5.0 (23.0)	−12.3 (9.9)	−12.3 (9.9)
Average precipitation mm (inches)	85.8 (3.38)	106.2 (4.18)	167.1 (6.58)	195.7 (7.70)	237.8 (9.36)	390.4 (15.37)	250.4 (9.86)	147.2 (5.80)	72.5 (2.85)	59.8 (2.35)	68.2 (2.69)	56.2 (2.21)	1,837.3 (72.33)
Average precipitation days (≥ 0.1 mm)	12.9	12.9	15.7	14.8	14.6	17.4	13.9	14.0	9.1	7.4	9.8	9.6	152.1
Average snowy days	3.6	2.2	0.6	0.1	0	0	0	0	0	0	0.1	1.3	7.9
Average relative humidity (%)	79	78	78	78	79	84	83	82	80	77	79	77	80
Mean monthly sunshine hours	99.3	97.4	109.7	131.3	150.6	120.3	190.7	190.6	164.1	161.1	132.1	125.7	1,672.9
Percentage possible sunshine	31	31	29	34	36	29	45	47	45	46	42	40	38
Source: China Meteorological Administration

== Transportation ==
=== Rail ===
Yi County is served by the Anhui–Jiangxi Railway, and has a station at Yuting, in the southern tip of the county.

== Notable people ==
- Wang Dazhi, Chinese educator
