= Xidi =

Xidi 西递村
- Village
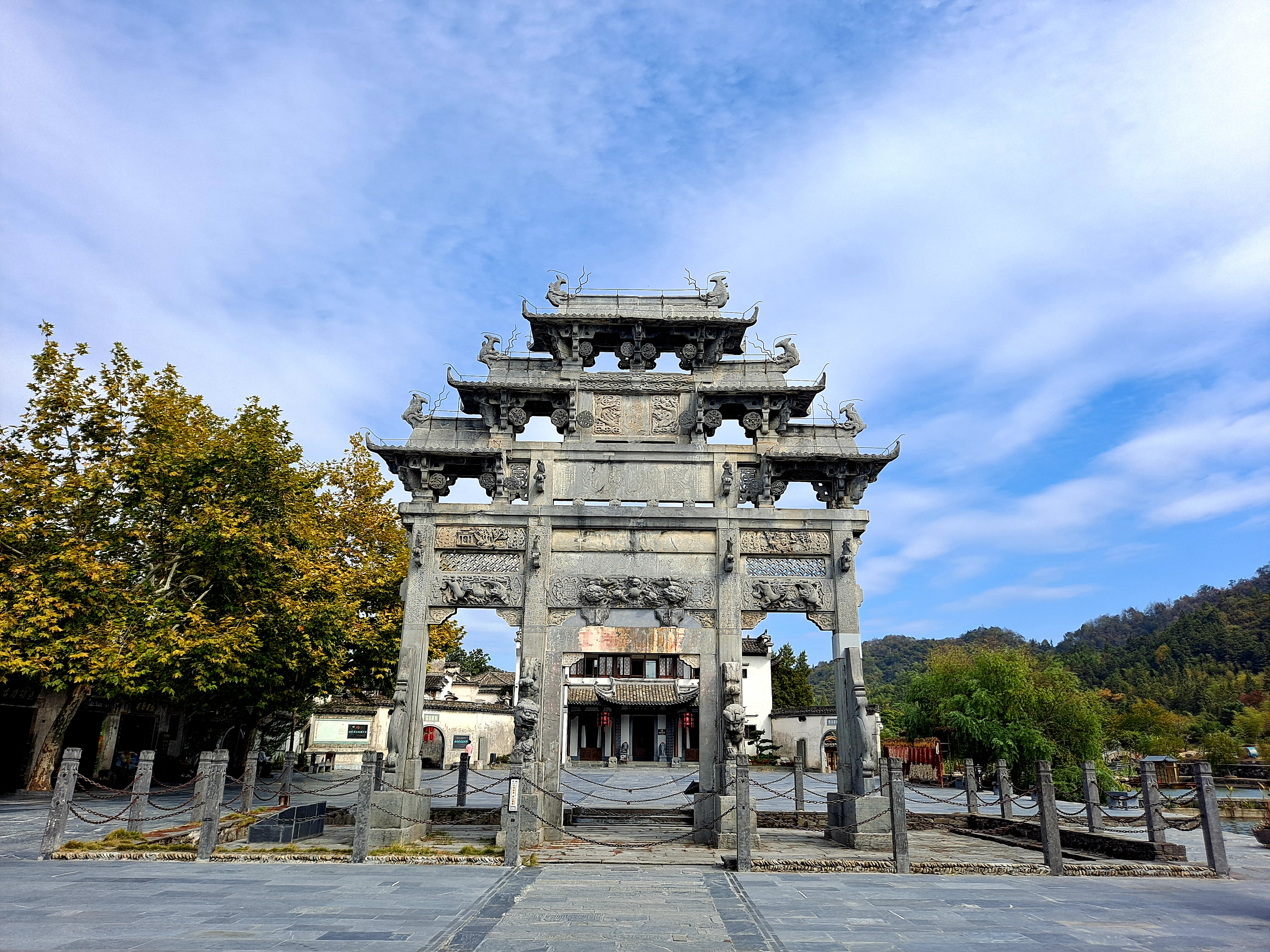
- Paifang in front of the town of Xidi
- Interactive map of Xidi
- Coordinates: 29°54′12″N 117°59′46″E
- Country: People's Republic of China
- Province: Anhui
- Prefecture-level city: Huangshan
- County: Yi
- Town: Xidi Town

UNESCO World Heritage Site
- Official name: Ancient Villages in Southern Anhui – Xidi and Hongcun
- Type: Cultural
- Criteria: iii, iv, v
- Designated: 2000
- Reference no.: 1002

Xidi
- "Xidi" in Simplified (top) and Traditional (bottom) Chinese characters
- Traditional Chinese: 西遞
- Simplified Chinese: 西递
- Literal meaning: "Western Post"
Transcriptions
Standard Mandarin
- Hanyu Pinyin: Xīdì
- Wade–Giles: Hsi^{1}-ti^{4}
- IPA: [ɕí.tî]
Wu
- Suzhounese: Si-tî
Yue: Cantonese
- Yale Romanization: Sāi-daih
- Jyutping: Sai^{1}-dai^{6}
Southern Min
- Tâi-lô: Se-tē

Xidi (Chinese: 西递) is a village in Xidi Town (西递镇), Yi County, Huangshan City of the historical Huizhou region of Anhui province, China. Xidi and the nearby town of Hongcun are known for their exceptional preservation of rural Anhui architecture and city planning during medieval China, and together they were declared the "Ancient Villages in Southern Anhui" World Heritage Site by UNESCO in 2000.

== History ==
First built during the Huangyou era (1049–1053) of Song dynasty Emperor Renzong, the village was originally called Xichuan (West River), owing to the water courses flowing through it.

The Hu family of Xidi are descended from Hu Shiliang, from Wuyuan, who was a descendant of Hu Changyi, a son of Emperor Zhaozong of Tang who was adopted by the Wuyuan Hu family.

The rise of the village was closely tied to the fortunes of the Hu family. By 1465 CE, during the Ming dynasty (1368–1644), family members had started in business as merchants, leading to construction of major private buildings and a public infrastructure. By the middle of the 17th century, the influence wielded by members of the Hu family expanded from commerce into politics. The prosperity of Xidi peaked in the 18th and 19th centuries, at which time the village comprised about 600 residences. However, during the late 19th century, the disintegration of the feudal system in China and the decline of merchant communities across Anhui cause the expansion of Xidi to cease

== City Plan ==
Xidi has maintained its original street plan and water systems from the medieval period. The street pattern of Xidi is dominated by a main road which runs in an east–west direction and is flanked by two parallel streets. These major streets are joined by many narrow alleyways. These streets are paved with original Yi County granite. Small open spaces are confined to areas immediately in front of the main public buildings, such as the "Hall of Respect", the "Hall of Reminiscence", and the "Memorial Archway of the Governor". As was typical for the time, the buildings are clustered near the three streams that make up the city. In the city, there are 224 ancient residential buildings, dating from between the 14th and 19th centuries. Of those, there are 124 well-preserved wooden residences from the Ming and Qing dynasties with beautiful carvings form the major attractions. The residences usually contain a central courtyard surrounded by symmetrical bays of rooms. Many of these residences are open to the public.

== Gallery ==
Xidi

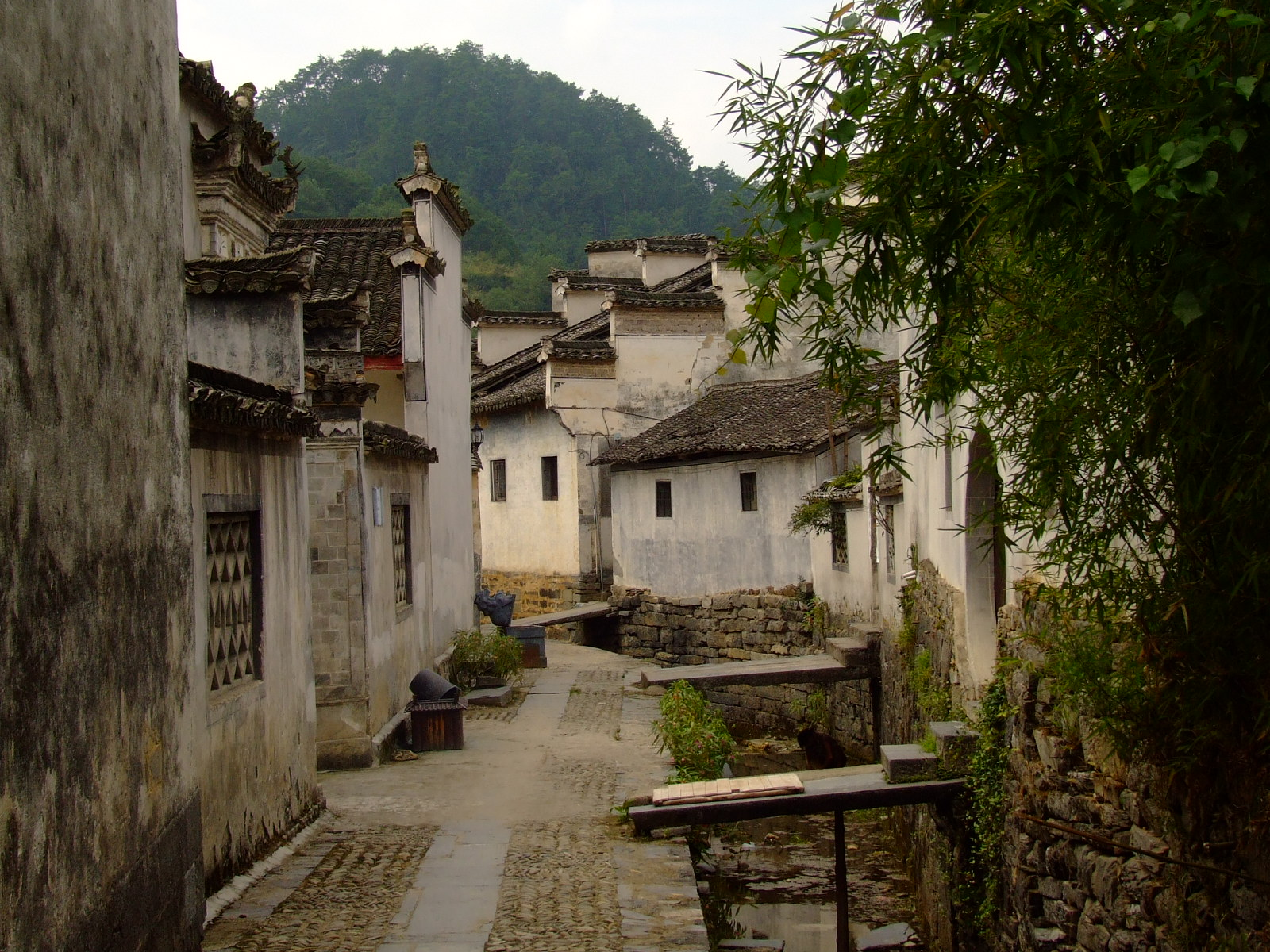

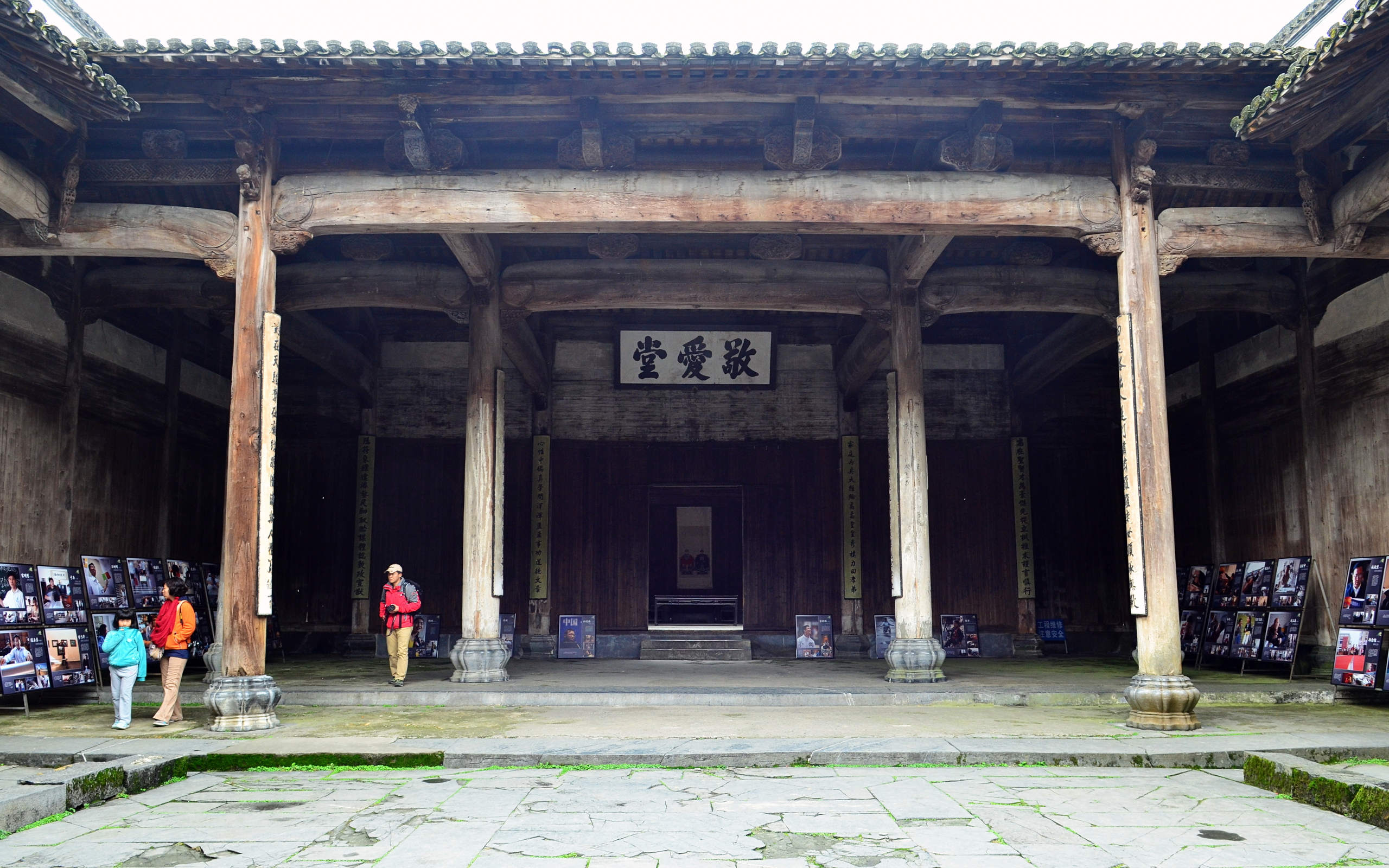

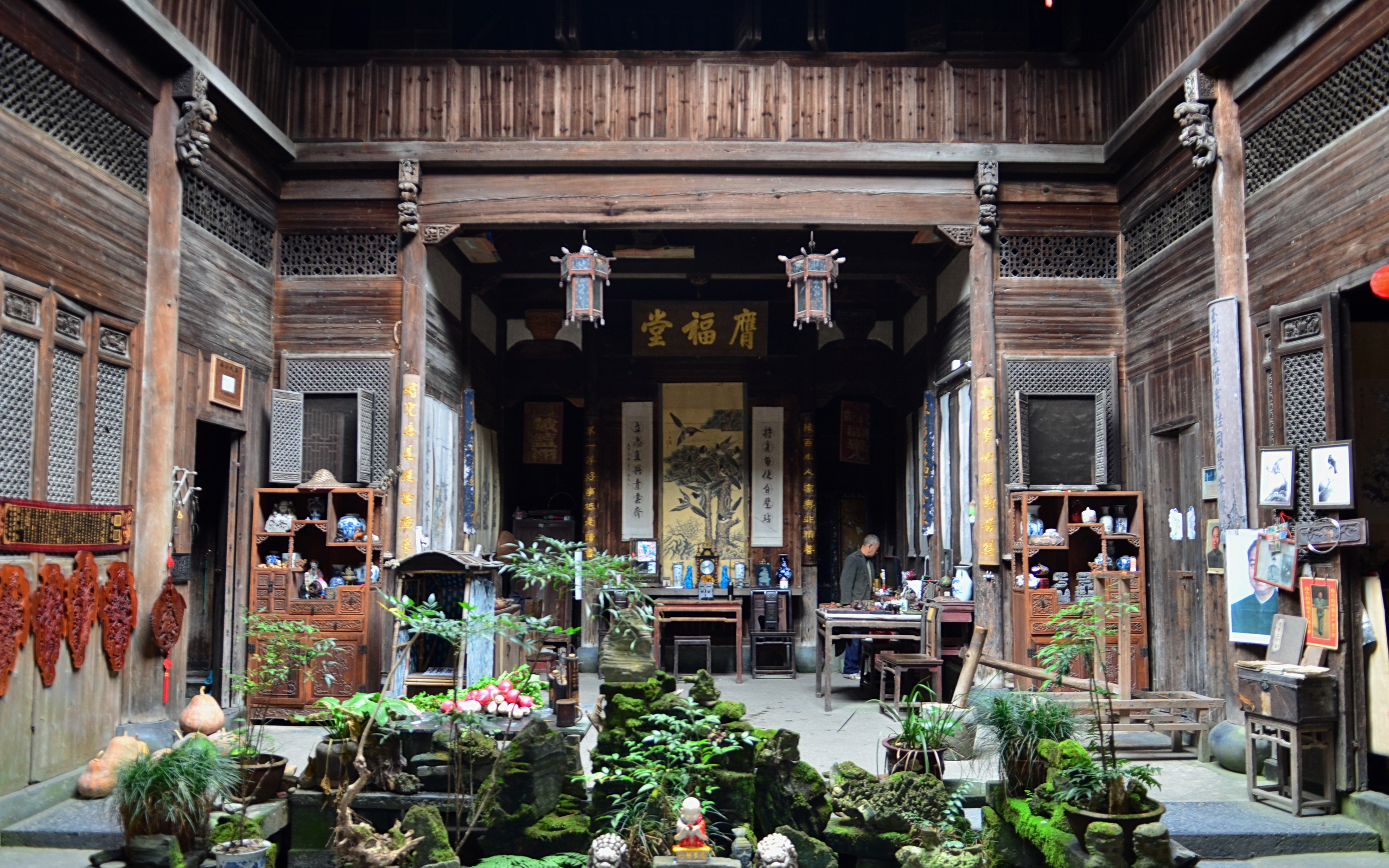

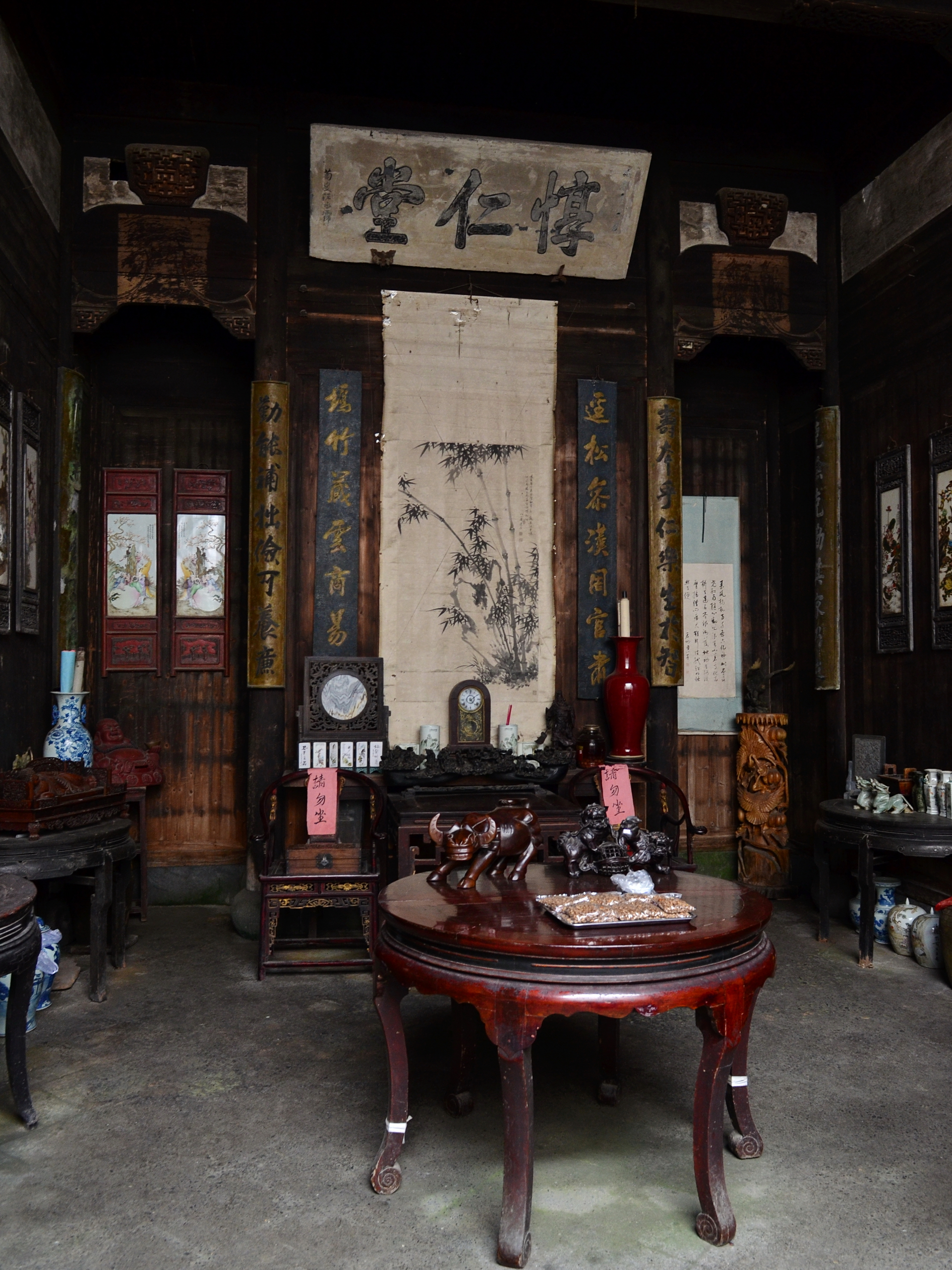

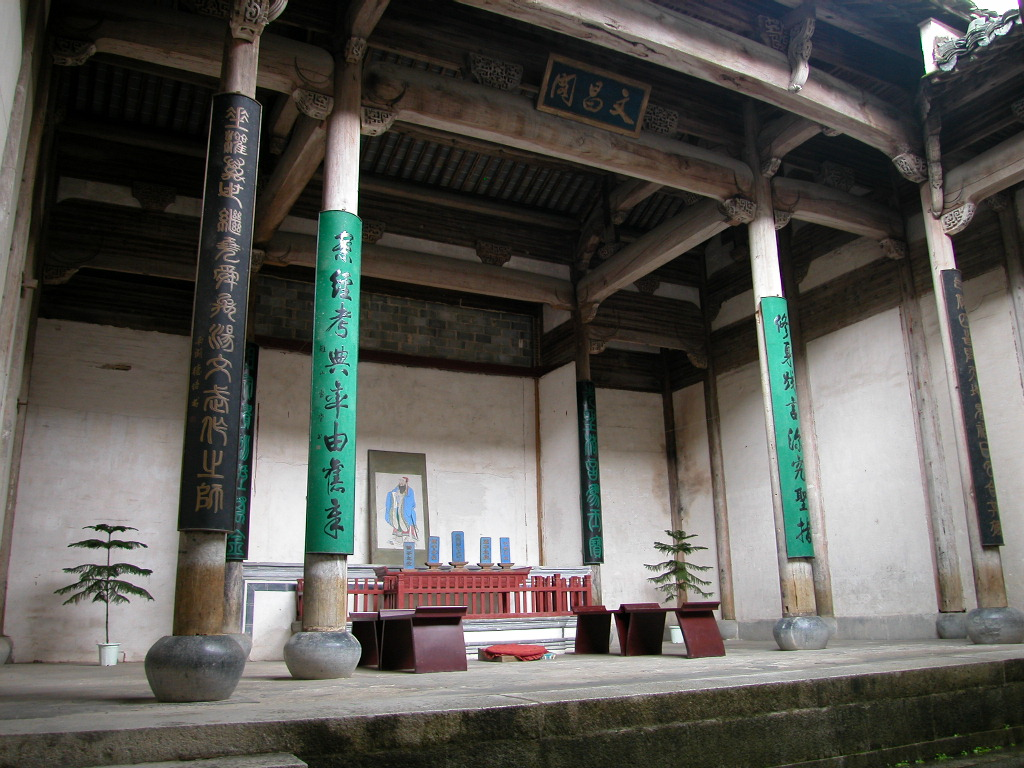
