= Hongcun =

Hongcun 宏村
- Village
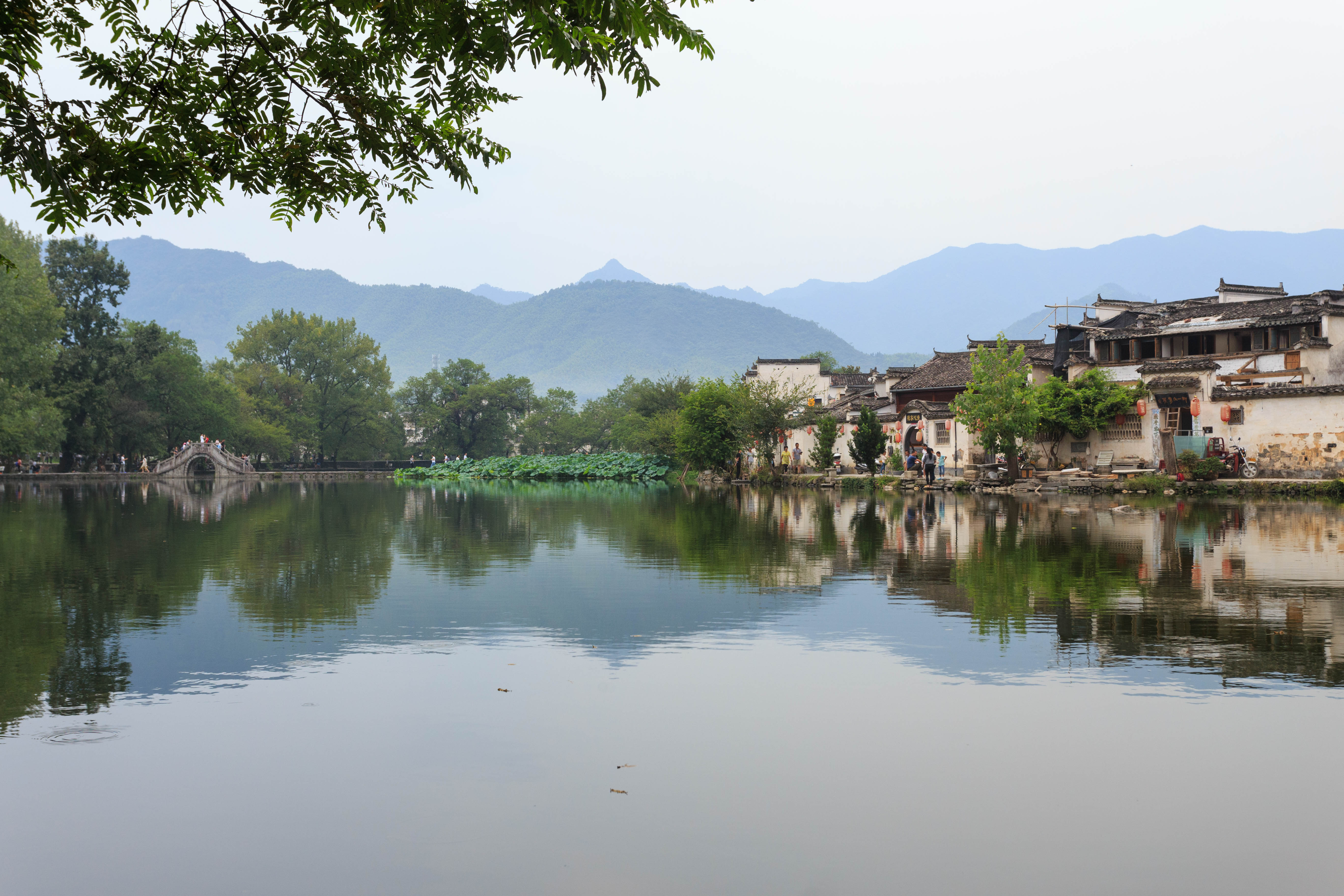
- Hongcun
- Interactive map of Hongcun
- Coordinates: 30°00′12″N 117°59′26″E
- Country: People's Republic of China
- Province: Anhui
- Prefecture-level city: Huangshan City
- County: Yi County
- Town: Hongcun Town

UNESCO World Heritage Site
- Official name: Ancient Villages in Southern Anhui – Xidi and Hongcun
- Type: Cultural
- Criteria: iii, iv, v
- Designated: 2000
- Reference no.: 1002
- Region: Asia

Hongcun (Chinese: 宏村; pinyin: Hóngcūn; lit. 'Hong village') is a village in Hongcun Town, Yi County, Huangshan City in the historical Huizhou region of southern Anhui Province, China, near the southwest slope of Mount Huangshan.

Together with Xidi, the village became a UNESCO World Heritage Site in 2000, because of its exceptional preservation of the architecture and city plan of a rural village in feudal China. Scenes from the film Crouching Tiger, Hidden Dragon were filmed on location in Hongcun.

== History and city planning ==
Hongcun was established in 1131 by Wang Wen, a general during the Southern Song dynasty. Like the neighboring Hu family in Xidi, the Wang family became prosperous merchants and the city grew in size from 1400 to about 1900. The architecture and carvings of the approximately 150 residences dating back to the Ming and Qing dynasties are said to be among the best of their kind in China. One of the biggest of the residences open to visitors, Chenzhi Hall, also contains a small museum.

The village is arranged in the shape of an ox with the nearby hill (Leigang Hill) interpreted as the head, and two trees standing on it as the horns. Four bridges across the Jiyin stream can be seen as the legs whilst the houses of the village form the body. Inside the "body", the Jiyin stream represents the intestines and various lakes such as the "South Lake" (Nanhu) form the other internal organs. A 400-year-old waterway connects each residential household to the two water sources in the town, with most of the streets built alongside them. These streets are paved with original Yi County granite. The usual residences of the town contain a central courtyard surrounded by symmetrical bays of rooms, although there are much larger and more private houses for the wealthier citizens.

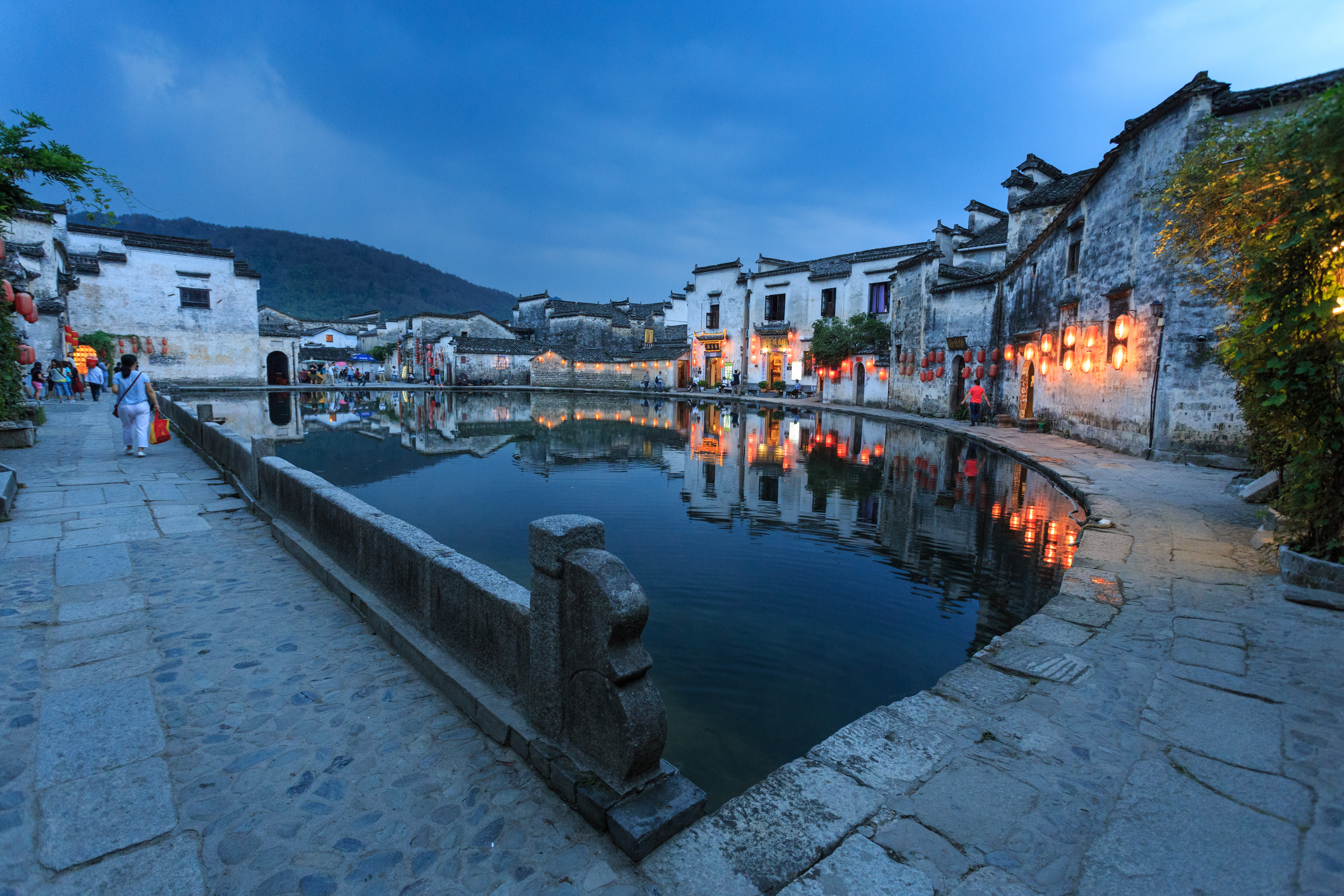
"Yuezhao" (Moon Pond)

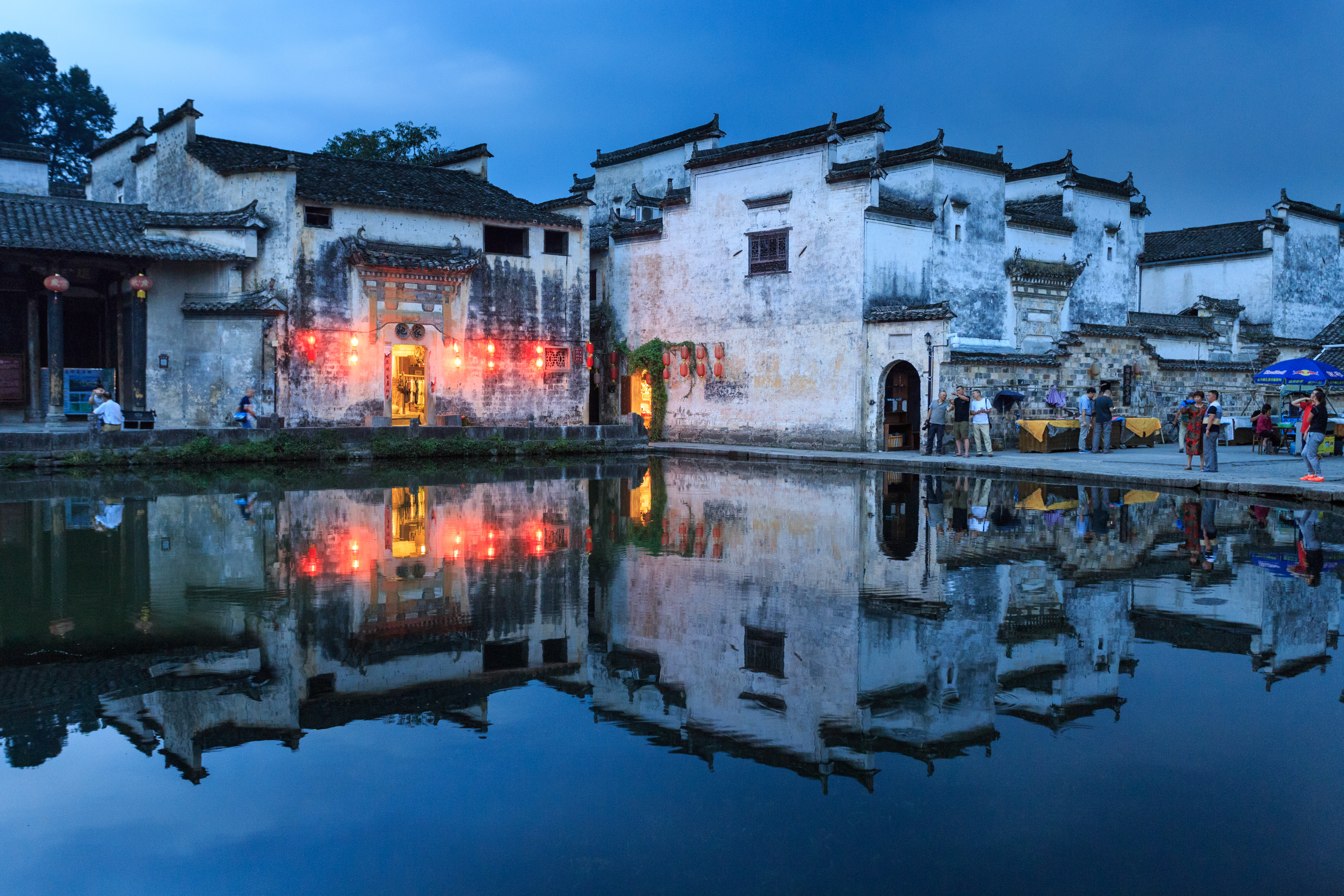
"Yuezhao" (Moon Pond)

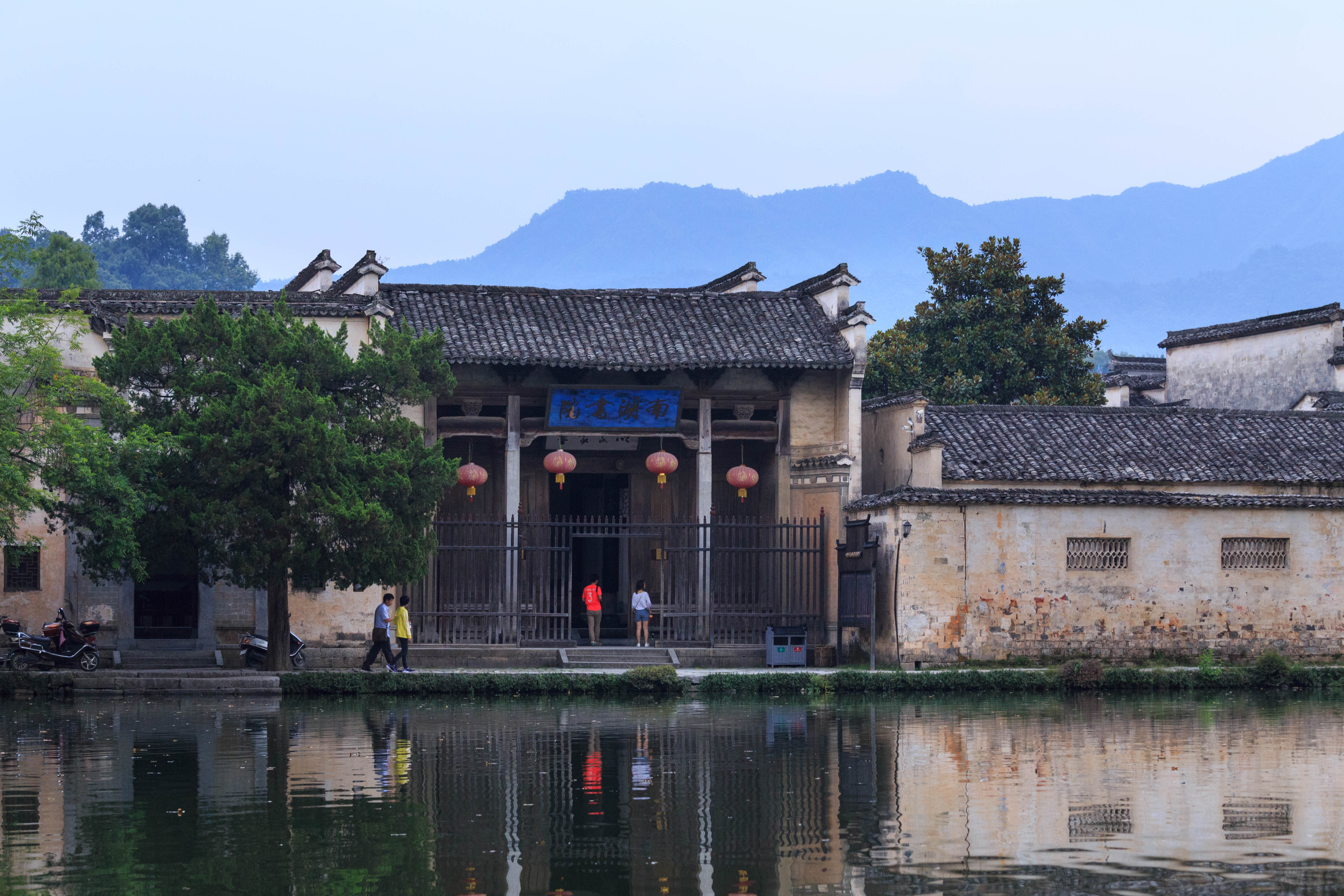
Nanhu Academy

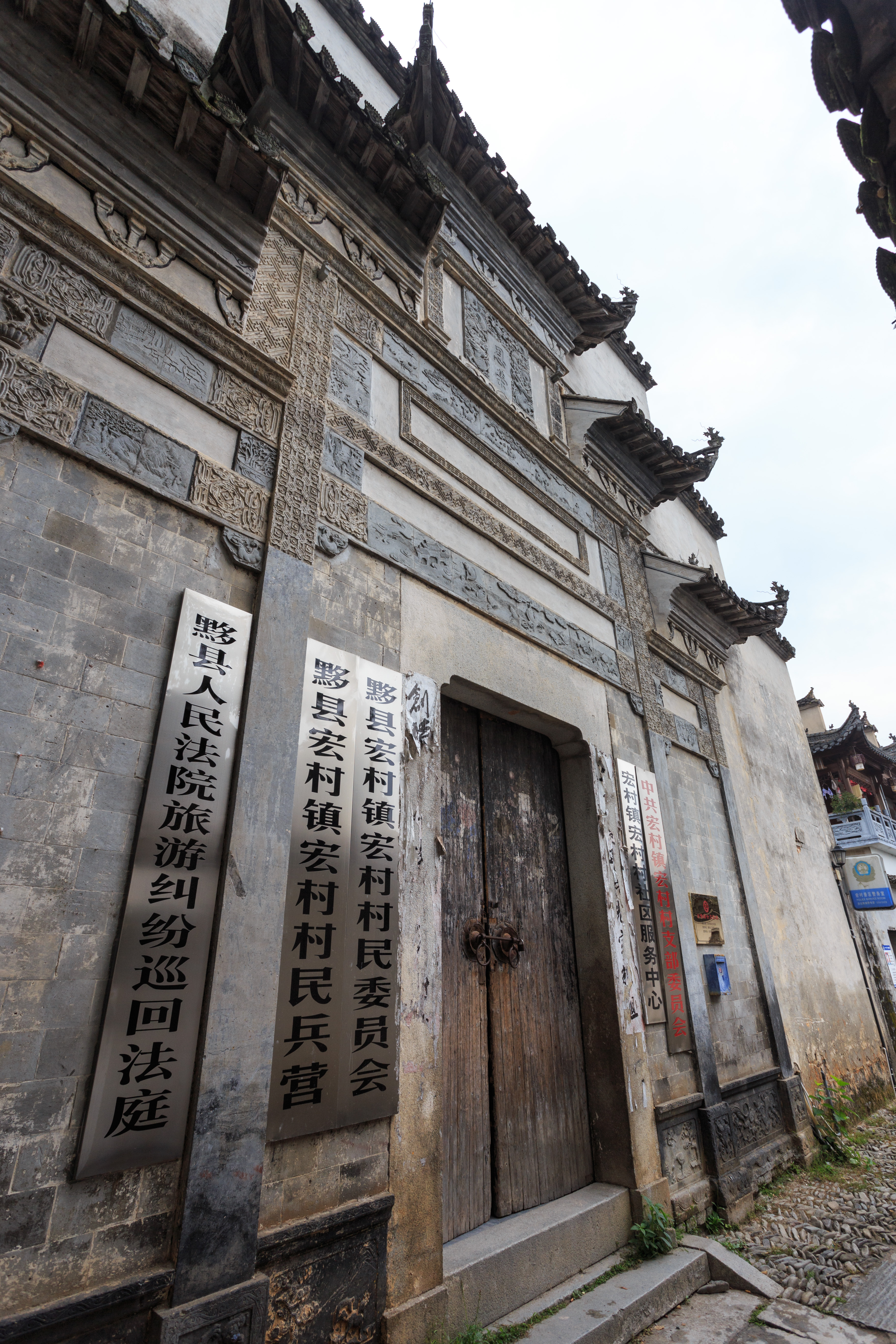
Villagers' committee
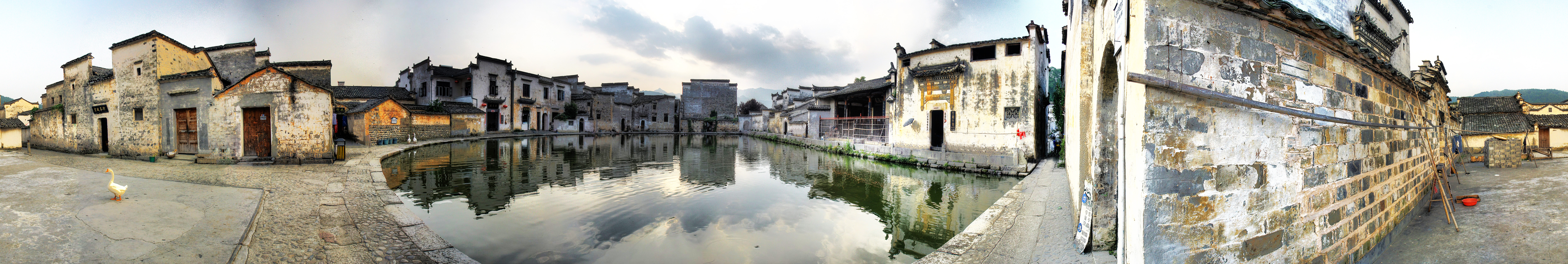
Hongcun, Anhui Province, China.

== Transportation ==
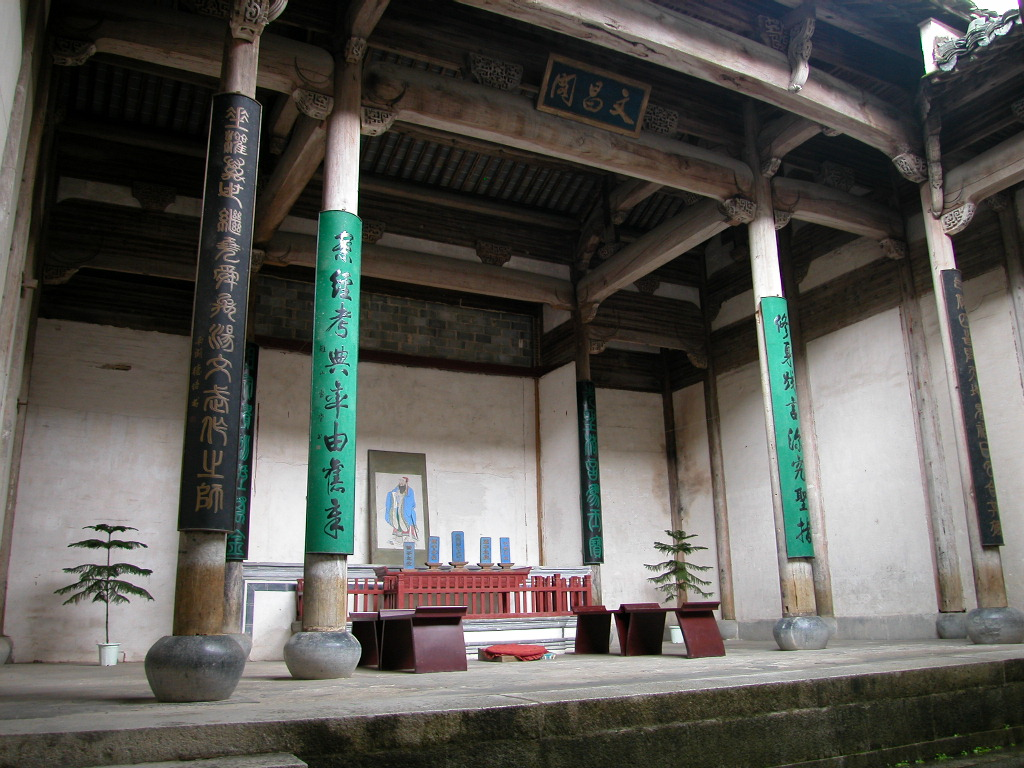
Ancient Villages in Southern Anhui – Xidi and Hongcun.

Buses are available from Huangshan Bus Station. There are also buses from Tangkou Bus Station to Hongcun. Tangkou Bus Station is at the foot of Huangshan Scenic Area.

== Notable people ==
- Wang Daxie
