= List of Adenanthos species =

Adenanthos species, subspecies and named hybrids

This is a list of Adenanthos species, subspecies and named hybrids. Taxa are listed in alphabetical order, and summary information is provided. For the most recent taxonomic arrangement, see Nelson's taxonomic arrangement of Adenanthos.

Name	Description			Taxonomy		Distribution and habitat			Conservation status	Image
Name	Habit	Leaf type	Flower colour	Published	Section	Range	Soil	Vegetation	Conservation status	Image
A. acanthophyllus (Prickly Woollybush)	Tall shrub, lignotuberous	Holly-like	Dark red to pale pink-red	A.S.George, 1974	A. sect. Adenanthos	Shark Bay	Sand of marine origin	Scrub or heath		
A. apiculatus	Prostrate subshrub, non-lignotuberous	Entire or lobed	Cream	R.Br., 1810	A. sect. Adenanthos	Stirling Range to King George Sound and Bremer Bay	Lateritic soils, sand	Scrub or heath		
A. argyreus (Little Woollybush)	Small shrub, non-lignotuberous	Laciniate	Bright red-pink	Diels, 1905	A. sect. Adenanthos	Lake King to Wyallkatchem to Southern Cross	Lateritic sand	Scrub or heath		
A. barbiger (Hairy Glandflower)	Small shrub, lignotuberous	Entire or lobed	Scarlet	Lindl., 1839	A. sect. Eurylaema	Toodyay to Manjimup to Augusta	Lateritic gravel	Open forest		
A. cacomorphus	Medium shrub, lignotuberous	Laciniate	Bright pink	E.C.Nelson, 1978	A. sect. Adenanthos	Fitzgerald River	Lateritic sand	Scrub or heath	Priority 2 (WA)	
A. cuneatus (Coastal Jugflower)	Medium shrub, occasionally a prostrate subshrub, lignotuberous	Laciniate	Crimson	Labill., 1805	A. sect. Adenanthos	Walpole to Twilight Cove	Sand	Scrub or heath		
A. × cunninghamii (Albany Woollybush)	Medium shrub, non-lignotuberous	Laciniate	Dull crimson	Meisn., 1845	A. sect. Adenanthos	King George Sound	Sand of marine origin	Scrub or heath	Priority 4 (WA)	
A. cygnorum (Common Woollybush)	Tall shrub or prostrate subshrub, non-lignotuberous	Laciniate	Light pink, cream, or green	Diels, 1905	A. sect. Adenanthos	Kalbarra to Arthur River	Lateritic soils, sand			
A. cygnorum subsp. chamaephyton	Prostrate subshrub, non-lignotuberous	Laciniate	Light pink, cream, or green	E.C.Nelson, 1978	A. sect. Adenanthos	Mundaring and Chidlow	Lateritic gravel	Open forest	Priority 4 (WA)	
A. cygnorum subsp. cygnorum (Common Woollybush)	Tall shrub, occasionally a tree, non-lignotuberous	Laciniate	Light pink, cream, or green		A. sect. Adenanthos	Kalbarra to Arthur River	Lateritic soils, sand	Open forest, scrub or heath		
A. detmoldii (Scott River Jugflower)	Tall shrub, non-lignotuberous	Entire or lobed	Yellow and orange/brown	F.Muell., 1874	A. sect. Eurylaema	Scott River to Whicher Range	Peat and waterlogged soils	Scrub or heath	Priority 4 (WA)	
A. dobagii (Fitzgerald Woollybush)	Small shrub, non-lignotuberous	Laciniate	Cream or pale pink	E.C.Nelson, 1978	A. sect. Adenanthos	Fitzgerald River	Skeletal soils	Scrub or heath	Endangered (EPBC Act) Rare (WA)	
A. dobsonii	Small shrub, lignotuberous	Entire or lobed	Red and/or cream	F.Muell., 1868	A. sect. Adenanthos	Cape Arid to Israelite Bay	Sand	Scrub or heath		
A. drummondii	Small shrub, lignotuberous	Laciniate	Scarlet apex, yellow base	Meisn., 1845	A. sect. Adenanthos	Bullsbrook to Wongan Hills to Three Springs	Lateritic soils	Scrub or heath		
A. ellipticus (Oval-leaf Adenanthos)	Medium shrub, non-lignotuberous	Entire or lobed	Orange-red and cream	A.S.George, 1974	A. sect. Adenanthos	Mount Barren Ranges	Skeletal soils	Scrub or heath	Vulnerable (EPBC Act) Rare (WA)	
A. eyrei (Toolinna Adenanthos)	Small shrub, non-lignotuberous	Laciniate	Dark crimson	E.C.Nelson, 1978	A. sect. Adenanthos	Toolinna	Sand of marine origin	Scrub or heath	Endangered (EPBC Act) Rare (WA)	
A. filifolius	Medium shrub, non-lignotuberous	Laciniate	Cream and black	Benth., 1870	A. sect. Adenanthos	Stirling Range to King George Sound and Bremer Bay	Skeletal soils	Scrub or heath	Priority 3 (WA)	
A. flavidiflorus	Small shrub, lignotuberous	Laciniate	Bright red-pink	F.Muell., 1859	A. sect. Adenanthos	Bremer Bay to Hyden	Lateritic sand	Scrub or heath		
A. forrestii	Medium shrub, lignotuberous	Laciniate	Pale red and cream, or cream	F.Muell., 1882	A. sect. Adenanthos	Twilight Cove, Toolinna and Israelite Plain	Sand of marine origin	Scrub or heath		
A. glabrescens	Small shrub, with or without lignotuber	Entire or lobed	Pink-scarlet and cream	E.C.Nelson, 1978	A. sect. Adenanthos	Lake King to Fitzgerald River to Ravensthorpe	Skeletal soils and lateritic sand	Scrub or heath		
A. glabrescens subsp. exasperatus	Small shrub, non-lignotuberous	Entire or lobed	Pink-scarlet and cream	E.C.Nelson, 1978	A. sect. Adenanthos	Lake King to Halls Track	Skeletal soils	Scrub or heath		
A. glabrescens subsp. glabrescens	Small shrub, lignotuberous	Entire or lobed	Pink-scarlet and cream		A. sect. Adenanthos	Fitzgerald River to Ravensthorpe	Lateritic sand	Scrub or heath		
A. gracilipes	Small shrub, lignotuberous	Laciniate	Cream and red-pink	A.S.George, 1974	A. sect. Adenanthos	Johnson Lakes and Frank Hann National Park	Lateritic sand	Scrub or heath	Priority 3 (WA)	
A. ileticos (Club-leaf Adenanthos)	Medium shrub, lignotuberous	Laciniate	Pale pink-red	E.C.Nelson, 1978	A. sect. Adenanthos	Esperance to Norseman	Lateritic sand	Open forest, woodland	Priority 4 (WA)	
A. labillardierei	Medium shrub, non-lignotuberous	Laciniate	Cream and claret	E.C.Nelson, 1978	A. sect. Adenanthos	Barren Ranges	Skeletal soils	Scrub or heath	Priority 4 (WA)	
A. linearis	Small shrub, non-lignotuberous	Entire or lobed	Cream with pink apex	Meisn., 1856	A. sect. Adenanthos	Stirling Range to King George Sound and Bremer Bay	Skeletal soils	Scrub or heath	Priority 2 (WA)	
A. macropodianus (Kangaroo Island Gland Flower)	Medium shrub, non-lignotuberous	Laciniate	Red-pink	E.C.Nelson, 1978	A. sect. Adenanthos	Kangaroo Island	Lateritic soils, sand	Open forest, scrub or heath		
A. meisneri (Prostrate Woollybush)	Medium shrub, lignotuberous	Laciniate	Red-purple or purple	Meisn., 1845	A. sect. Adenanthos	Swan River to Point D'Entrecasteaux	Sand	Open forest, scrub or heath		
A. obovatus (Basket Flower)	Small shrub, lignotuberous	Entire or lobed	Scarlet	Labill., 1805	A. sect. Eurylaema	Gingin to Augusta to Green Range, also Narrogin	Skeletal soils, lateritic sand, peaty sand and waterlogged soils	Open forest, scrub or heath		
A. oreophilus (Woollybush)	Medium shrub, non-lignotuberous	Laciniate	Scarlet	E.C.Nelson, 1978	A. sect. Adenanthos	Fitzgerald River area	Lateritic gravel	Scrub or heath		
A. × pamela	Medium shrub, lignotuberous	Entire or lobed	Orange or light red	E.C.Nelson, 1986	A. sect. Eurylaema	Scott River			Priority 4 (WA)	
A. pungens (Spiky Adenanthos)	Medium shrub or prostrate subshrub, non-lignotuberous	Laciniate	Pale or dark pink	Meisn., 1845	A. sect. Adenanthos	Tambellup and Hamella Hill	Skeletal soils and lateritic sand	Scrub or heath		
A. pungens subsp. effusus (Sprawling Spiky Adenanthos)	Prostrate subshrub, non-lignotuberous	Laciniate	Pale pink	E.C.Nelson, 1978	A. sect. Adenanthos	Tambellup	Lateritic sand	Scrub or heath	Endangered (EPBC Act) Rare (WA)	
A. pungens subsp. pungens (Spiky Adenanthos)	Medium shrub, non-lignotuberous	Laciniate	Dark pink		A. sect. Adenanthos	Hamella Hill	Skeletal soils	Scrub or heath	Vulnerable (EPBC Act) Rare (WA)	
A. sericeus (Coastal Woollybush)	Tall shrub, occasionally a tree, non-lignotuberous	Laciniate	Scarlet	Labill., 1805	A. sect. Adenanthos	King George Sound to Warriup, Cape Le Grand, Cape Arid	Skeletal soils, and sand of marine origin	Scrub or heath		
A. sericeus subsp. sericeus (Coastal Woollybush)	Tall shrub, non-lignotuberous	Laciniate	Scarlet		A. sect. Adenanthos	Cape Le Grand, Cape Arid	Skeletal soils	Scrub or heath		
A. sericeus subsp. sphalma	Tall shrub, occasionally a tree, non-lignotuberous	Laciniate	Scarlet	E.C.Nelson, 1978	A. sect. Adenanthos	King George Sound to Warriup	Sand of marine origin	Scrub or heath		
A. stictus	Tall shrub, non-lignotuberous	Laciniate	Crimson	A.S.George, 1974	A. sect. Adenanthos	Watheroo to Coorow	Lateritic sand	Scrub or heath		
A. terminalis (Yellow Gland Flower)	Medium shrub, non-lignotuberous	Laciniate	Cream	R.Br., 1810	A. sect. Adenanthos	Eyre Peninsula, Kangaroo Island, Adelaide to Little Desert	Lateritic soils, sand	Scrub or heath		
A. velutinus (Velvet Woollybush)	Tall shrub, non-lignotuberous	Laciniate	Red-purple or purple	Meisn., 1856	A. sect. Adenanthos	Cranbrook	Skeletal soils	Scrub or heath	Endangered (EPBC Act) Rare (WA)	
A. venosus	Medium shrub, lignotuberous	Entire or lobed	Dull crimson and cream	Meisn., 1856	A. sect. Adenanthos	Fitzgerald River	Skeletal soils	Scrub or heath		
