= Woollybush =

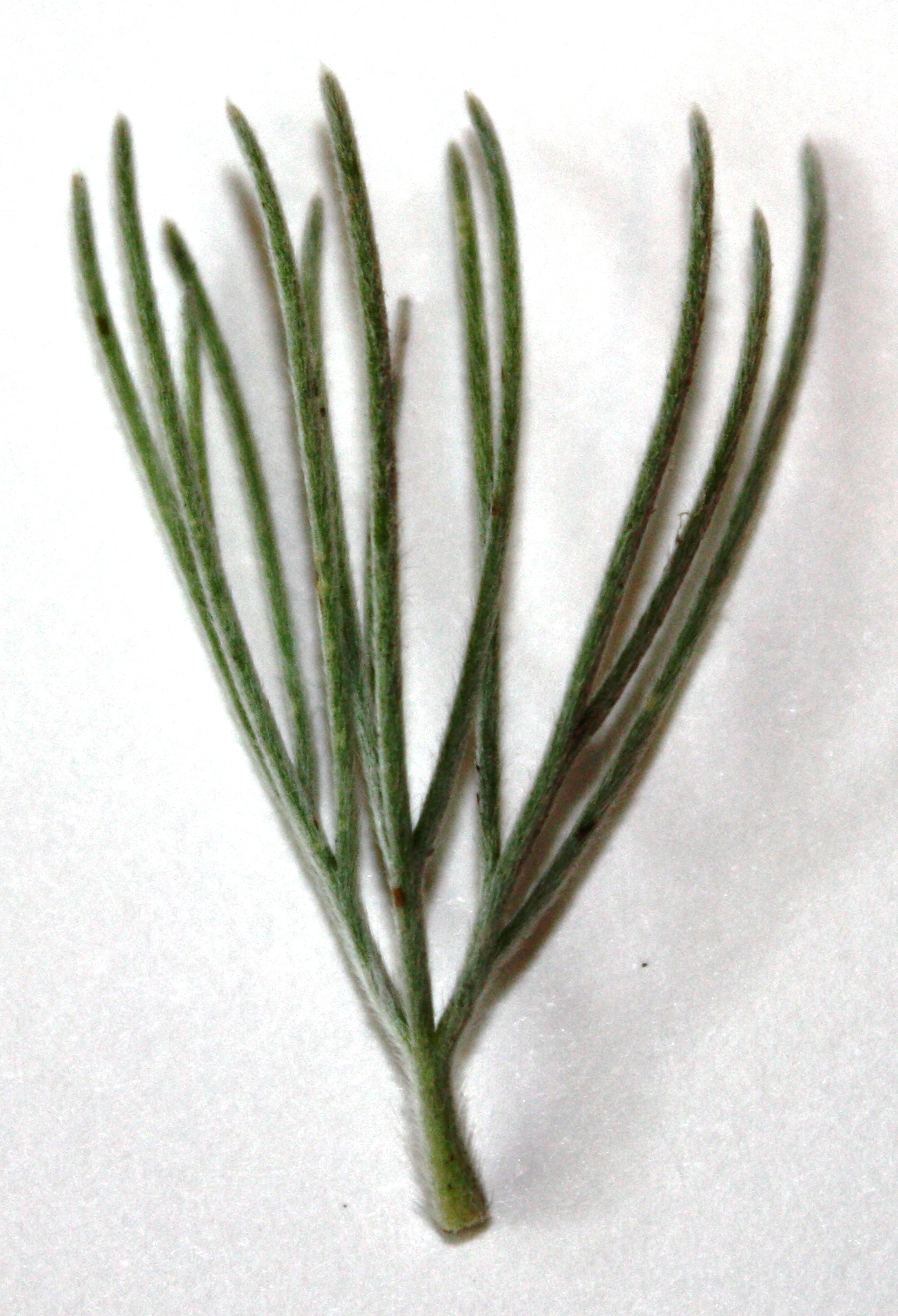
A single leaf of A. sericeus, showing the characters that give rise to the common name woollybush.

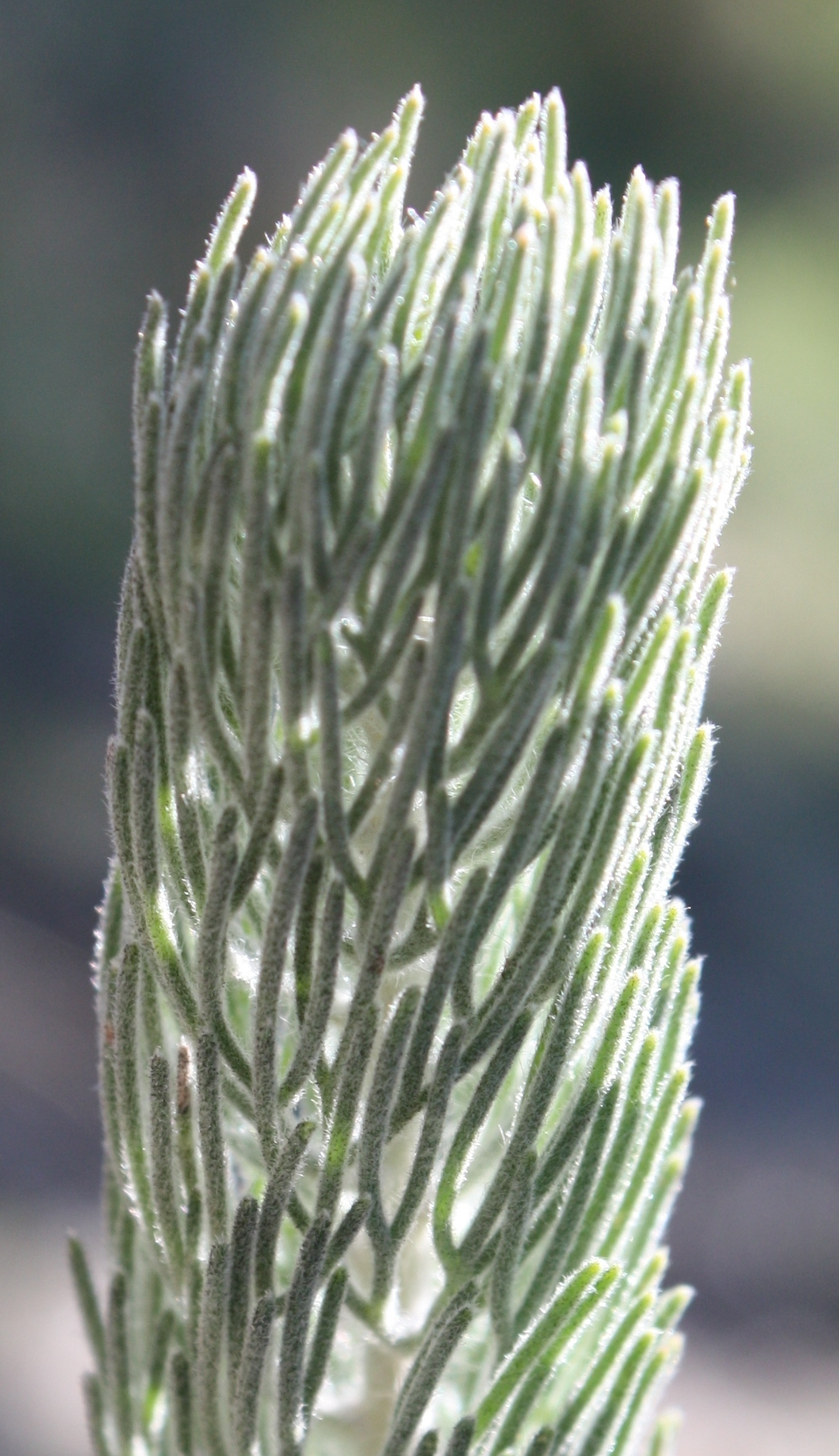
Closeup of a branch tip of A. cygnorum.

Woollybush, woolly bush or woolly-bush is a common name for plants of the genus Adenanthos with leaves deeply divided into long, soft, slender laciniae, often covered in a fine down of soft hairs. These properties give the leaves a soft, silky feel, in stark contrast to the sclerophyllous plants that dominate both its geographic range (southern Australia) and its taxonomic family (Proteaceae). This softness accounts for the common name.

13 species of Adenanthos possess these properties. Many of these have common names that include the woollybush epithet. However the two species of Adenanthos that occur outside Western Australia are both woollybushes yet have common names based on the name gland flower. This suggests that the common name woollybush is exclusively a Western Australian name.

Species of woollybush include:

- Adenanthos acanthophyllus (prickly woollybush)
- Adenanthos argyreus (little woollybush)
- Adenanthos cygnorum (woollybush, common woollybush)
- Adenanthos dobagii (Fitzgerald woollybush)
- Adenanthos labillardierei
- Adenanthos macropodianus (Kangaroo Island gland flower)
- Adenanthos meisneri (prostrate woollybush)
- Adenanthos oreophilus (woollybush)
- Adenanthos sericeus (woollybush, coastal woollybush, tall woollybush, Albany woollybush)
- Adenanthos terminalis (yellow gland flower)
- Adenanthos velutinus (velvet woollybush)
- Adenanthos × cunninghamii (woollybush, Albany woollybush, prostrate woollybush)

Ernest Charles Nelson states that the name has been in use for a long time, and believes that it originated in the vicinity of Albany, Western Australia.
