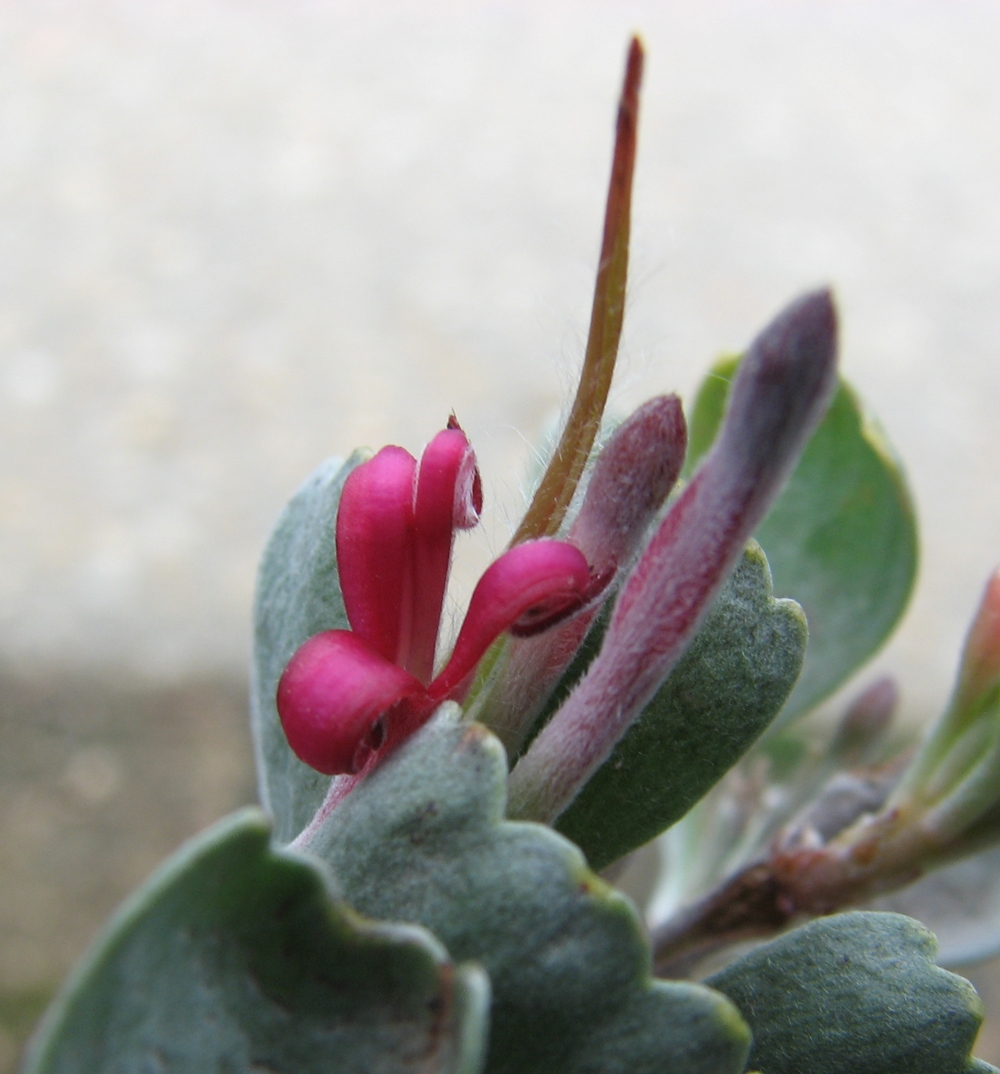
- Inflorescence and foliage of A. cuneatus (coastal jugflower), the type species of Adenanthos

Scientific classification
- Kingdom: Plantae
- Clade: Embryophytes
- Clade: Tracheophytes
- Clade: Spermatophytes
- Clade: Angiosperms
- Clade: Eudicots
- Order: Proteales
- Family: Proteaceae
- Subfamily: Proteoideae
- Tribe: Leucadendreae
- Subtribe: Adenanthinae
- Genus: Adenanthos; Labill.

Type species
- Adenanthos cuneatus Labill.

Species
- A. detmoldii; A. barbiger; A. obovatus; A. × pamela; A. drummondii; A. dobagii; A. apiculatus; A. linearis; A. pungens; A. pungens subsp. pungens; A. pungens subsp. effusus; A. gracilipes; A. venosus; A. dobsonii; A. glabrescens; A. glabrescens subsp. glabrescens; A. glabrescens subsp. exasperatus; A. ellipticus; A. cuneatus; A. stictus; A. ileticos; A. forrestii; A. eyrei; A. cacomorphus; A. flavidiflorus; A. argyreus; A. macropodianus; A. terminalis; A. sericeus; A. sericeus subsp. sericeus; A. sericeus subsp. sphalma; A. × cunninghamii; A. oreophilus; A. cygnorum; A. cygnorum subsp. cygnorum; A. cygnorum subsp. chamaephyton; A. meisneri; A. velutinus; A. filifolius; A. labillardierei; A. acanthophyllus

= Adenanthos =

Genus of shrubs native to Australia

Adenanthos is a genus of Australian native shrubs in the flowering plant family Proteaceae. Variable in habit and leaf shape, it is the only genus in the family where solitary flowers are the norm. It was discovered in 1791, and formally published by Jacques Labillardière in 1805. The type species is Adenanthos cuneatus, and 33 species are recognised. The genus is placed in subfamily Proteoideae, and is held to be most closely related to several South African genera.

Endemic to Australia, its centre of diversity is southwest Western Australia, where 31 species occur. The other two species occur in South Australia and western Victoria (Australia). They are mainly pollinated by birds.

== Description ==
=== Habit ===
The growth habits of Adenanthos species range from prostrate shrubs to small trees, with most species occurring as erect shrubs. There are two basic growth forms. Plants that lack a lignotuber have a single stem. Such plants usually grow into fairly erect shrubs; and sometimes the main stem thickens to become a trunk, resulting in a small tree. Plants with a lignotuber, on the other hand, have many stems arising from the underground rootstock, usually resulting in smaller shrubs with a mallee habit.

=== Leaf ===
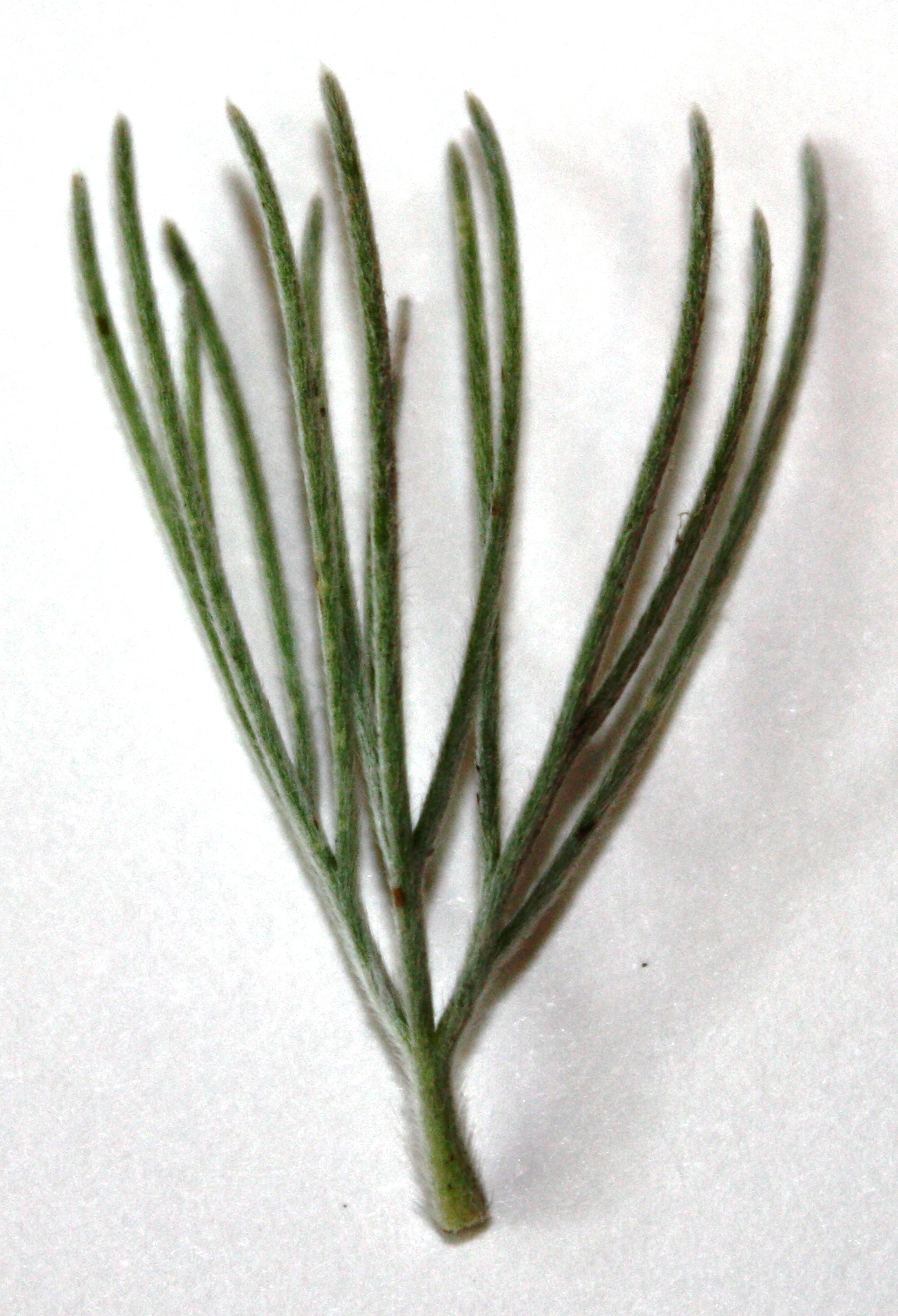
A single A. sericeus leaf

As with most other Proteaceae genera, leaf shape is highly variable in Adenanthos. Though the leaves are always simple (as in not compound), they may be lobed, or even deeply divided into segments, usually by three.

This segmentation has its extreme in the distinctive leaf form characteristic of those Adenanthos species known as woollybushes, in which the leaf is segmented, sometimes many times, into long thin laciniae, round in cross-section (terete), and often covered in a fine down of soft hairs. The number of laciniae varies greatly. In A. pungens, for example, the leaves may be entire, or there may be a single segmentation into two or three laciniae; in A. sericeus, the leaf is repeatedly tri-segmented into as many as 50 laciniae. This leaf form is seen in around half of the species.

Other common leaf forms include a wedge-shaped (cuneate) leaf with shallow lobes along the apex, seen, for example, in A. cuneatus and A. stictus; the oval-shaped (obovate) entire leaves of A. ellipticus and A. obovatus; and the long thin leaves of A. detmoldii and A. barbiger. Only two species have leaves that are sharply pointed (pungent): A. pungens has a woollybush form of leaf with pungent laciniae, and A. acanthophyllus is a flat (laminar), deeply lobed leaf with sharp points along its margins.

Some sources state that some leaves of some species are tipped with extrafloral nectaries.

=== Inflorescence and flower ===
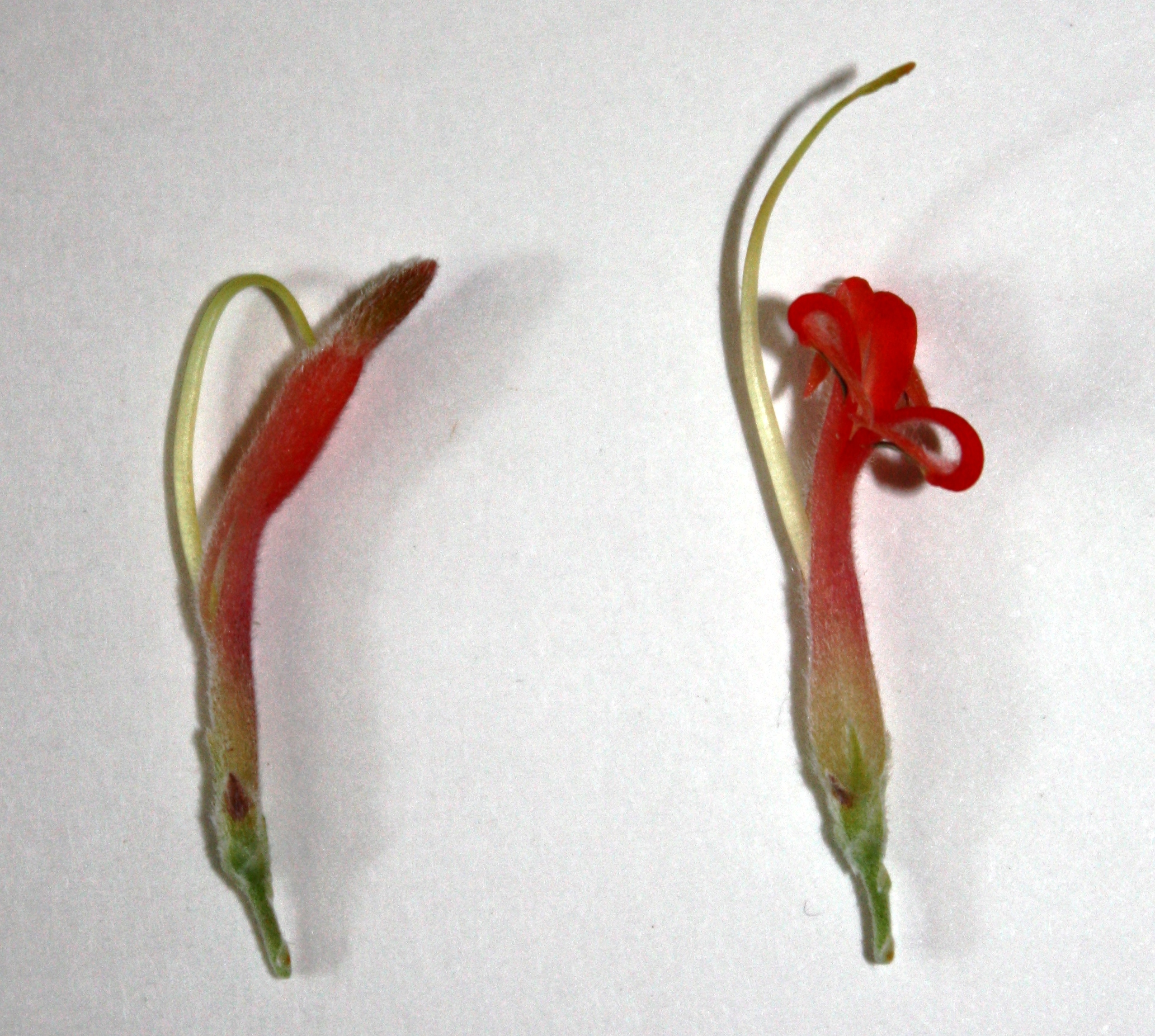
Flower of A. sericeus, before (left) and after (right) anthesis

Unusually for members of the family Proteaceae, Adenanthos flowers are solitary, rather than clustered together in large showy inflorescences. In fact, morphologically speaking, the Adenanthos flower does occur in an inflorescence, but one in which the number of flowers has been reduced to one, leaving only a few vestigial clues to the elaborate structure from which it derived. Each flower is positioned at the end of a short peduncle. The peduncle has minute basal bracts at its base, and sometimes at its midpoint, providing evidence of the loss of some lateral axes. At the end of the peduncle sits the flower, sessile or very nearly so, and surrounded at the base by an imbricate involucre. Very rarely, an involucre may enclose two flowers rather than just one, providing further evidence of reduction from a complex, multi-flowered inflorescence. Inflorescences occur individually at the end of branches (terminal) or at branch junctions (axillary). Most species have terminal inflorescences, and in these cases the inflorescences are usually subtended by leaves, if not branchlets, so the flowers are obscured by the foliage. The species with axillary inflorescences tend to be much more showy.

The flower of Adenanthos is structurally the same as that of many other Proteaceae. Flower parts occur in multiples of four (tetramerous), but the four tepals are fused into a long, narrow perianth-tube topped by a closed cup (the limb); the filament of each stamen is fused along its entire length with the midrib of a tepal, so that the anthers appear almost sessile, trapped within the limb; and the four carpels form a single compound pistil, the apex of which is also trapped within the limb. Four prominent scale-like nectaries surround the ovary.

Structurally, the flowers of most Adenanthos species are radially symmetrical (actinomorphic); but in the small section Eurylaema, one anther is sterile and reduced to a staminode, rendering the flowers structurally merely bilaterally symmetrical (zygomorphic). In both cases the flower soon becomes zygomorphic, as the pistil grows faster and longer than the perianth tube, causing the style to flex until it pushes its way out through a slit in the perianth-tube, which bends away from the style.

The apex of the style, called the stigma in most flowering plants, is often referred to as the style-end in Proteaceae, since it performs two distinct functions: it performs the usual stigmatic role of pollen-collector, but also functions as a pollen-presenter. At anthesis, both the style-end and the anthers are trapped within the limb, so that when the anthers release their pollen, the pollen adheres to the style-end. Shortly after pollen release, the tips of the tepals separate, causing the limb to break apart. The style-end is released, the style springs erect, and the flower's pollen is thus held aloft where it may be deposited on the face of a nectarivorous bird. Unlike some other Proteaceae genera, the style-end of Adenanthos shows little evidence of adaption to either of its dual roles. In most species is it slightly broader than the style, and conical in shape, but in section Eurylaema is oval and flattened. In both cases the stigmatic groove is a furrow on one side of the style end.

=== Fruit and seed ===
The fruit of Adenanthos is a simple dry hard-shelled nut that surrounds the seed but does not adhere to it (an achene). It is brown, ellipsoid in shape, and ranges in size from three to eight mm long, and one to two millimetres wide. It is not often seen on the plant because it develops within the involucre of the flower, which persists long after the flower itself has withered and fallen. By the time the fruit is mature, the involucre has dried and spread, so that the fruit is free to fall to the ground as soon as it abscisses from the plant. In some species this happens as soon as the fruit is mature; in others, the fruit may be retained on the plant for some time.

The production of seedless fruit (parthenocarpy) is common, as is seed abortion (stenospermocarpy). When a seed is present, it is white, ellipsoidal, and nearly fills the fruit.

== Taxonomy ==
=== Early collections ===
Early explorers who could have seen and collected Adenanthos include Willem de Vlamingh and William Dampier. Vlamingh explored the Swan River and visited Shark Bay in 1697. He almost certainly collected plant specimens, as two south-west Australian endemics were published many years later, based on specimens for which the collection cannot be attributed to any other known voyage. Two years after Vlamingh, Dampier visited the north-west coast, collecting around 40 specimens of 23 plant species from sites at Shark Bay and in the Dampier Archipelago. There is no record in either case of specimens of Adenanthos being seen or collected, but A. cygnorum is fairly common at the Swan River, and A. acanthophyllus occurs at Shark Bay, albeit only at the southern end of Peron Peninsula, where neither expedition is likely to have visited.

The first known collection of the genus was made by Archibald Menzies, surgeon and naturalist to the Vancouver Expedition of 1791–1795. The Vancouver expedition discovered King George Sound in September 1791, and during their stay there Menzies collected specimens of many plant species, including two Adenanthos species, A. sericeus

Jacques Labillardière, naturalist to Bruni d'Entrecasteaux's expedition in search of the lost ships of Jean-François de Galaup, comte de La Pérouse, visited Esperance Bay on the south coast of Western Australia in 1792, collecting A. cuneatus there.

In December 1801 and January 1802, at the start of Matthew Flinders' famous circumnavigation of Australia, HMS Investigator visited King George Sound for several weeks. The botanist to the voyage, Robert Brown, made an extensive plant specimen collection, including A. cuneatus, A. sericeus and A. obovatus. A few months later he collected what would become the type specimen of A. terminalis from near Port Lincoln. As HMS Investigator was commencing its anticlockwise circumnavigation, a French expedition under Nicolas Baudin was exploring the coastline in a clockwise direction. The two expeditions famously encountered each other in 1802 at what would be named Encounter Bay in South Australia, then Baudin continued westward, arriving at King George Sound in February 1803. There, botanist Jean Baptiste Leschenault de la Tour, assisted by gardener's boy Antoine Guichenot, collected plant specimens including A. cuneatus, A. obovatus and A. sericeus.

=== Publication ===
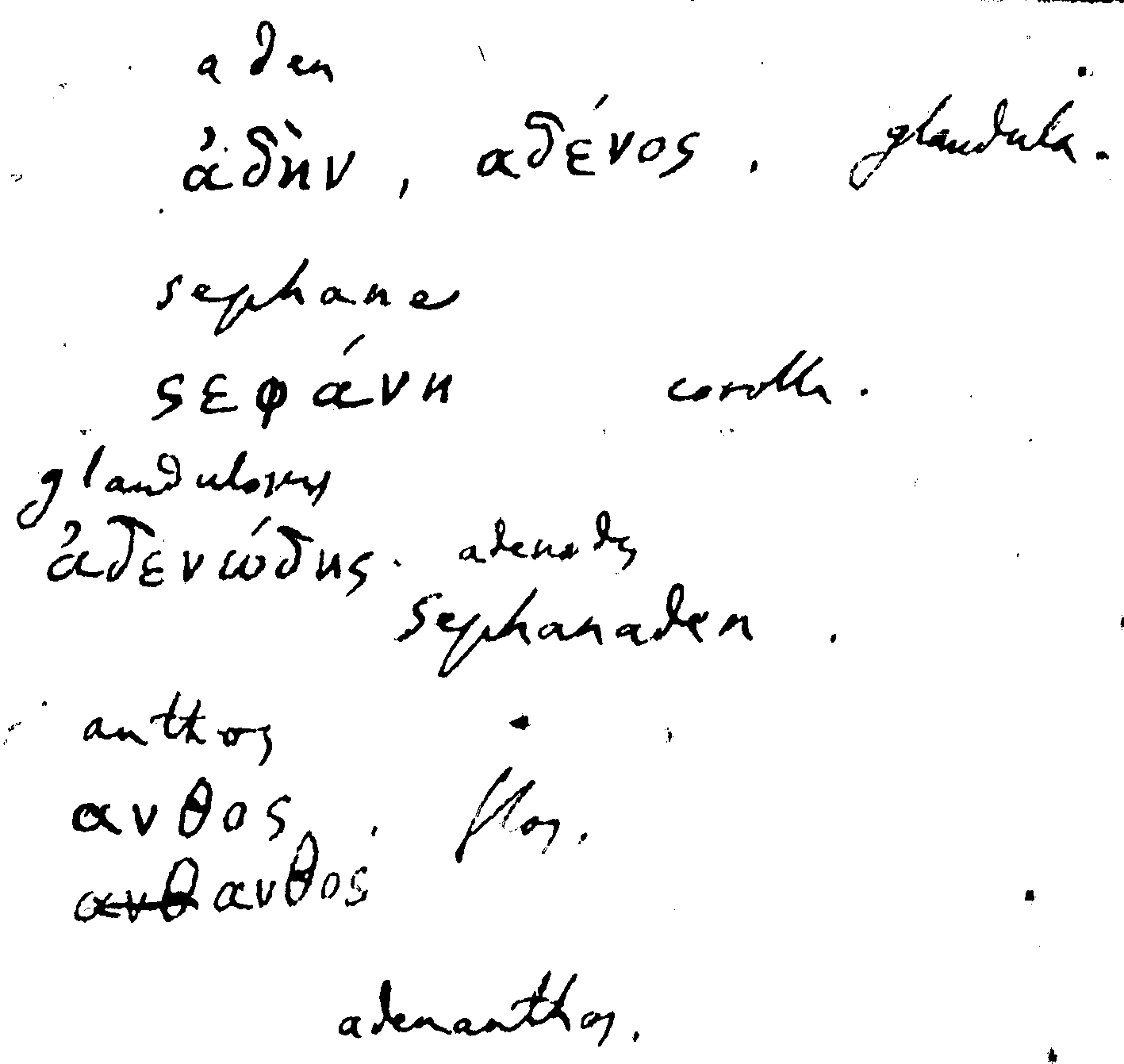
Annotation on the holotype of A. cuneatus, showing Labillardière's derivation of the name Adenanthos

The genus Adenanthos was first described and named by Labillardière in his 1805 Novae Hollandiae Plantarum Specimen. Though he did not give an explicit etymology for the genus name therein, the type specimen for A. cuneatus contains annotations that show Labillardière experimenting with various Greek word stems, listing in each case the corresponding Latin transliteration and meaning. He eventually settled on Adenanthos, formed from the Greek stems άδὴν (aden, glandula, "gland") and ανθος (anthos, flos, "flower"). Irish botanist E. Charles Nelson states that the name refers to the prominent and copiously productive nectaries.

Labillardière published three species, naming them A. cuneata, A. sericea and A. obovata, giving them feminine gender consistent with his view of the gender of the genus name. He did not say which of the three was to serve as type species for the genus, but Nelson has since chosen A. cuneatus as lectotype, since Labillardière's description of it is referred to by the descriptions of the other two species.

Labillardière also did not acknowledge a collector of the specimens upon which these names were based, and so it was long thought that Labillardière himself collected them. However, neither A. obovatus nor the type subspecies of A. sericeus occurs at any location visited by Labillardière, suggesting that some of his specimens were obtained from some other collector whom he failed to credit. The realisation of this fact prompted a re-evaluation of the type material by Nelson, who attributed their collection to Leschenault. This view has been accepted by some scholars though others treat it more cautiously.

=== Relationships within Proteaceae ===
The framework for classification of genera within Proteaceae was laid by L. A. S. Johnson and Barbara Briggs in their influential 1975 monograph "On the Proteaceae: the evolution and classification of a southern family". Their arrangement has been refined somewhat over the ensuing three decades, most notably by Peter H. Weston and Nigel Barker in 2006. Proteaceae is divided into five subfamilies, with Adenanthos placed in subfamily Proteoideae because of its cluster roots, solitary ovules and indehiscent fruits. On the basis of phylogenetic data it is further placed in tribe Leucodendreae, a morphologically heterogeneous group with no obvious diagnostic characters, and dominated by South African genera. Within Leucodendreae it appears as sister clade to a clade comprising the South African subtribe Leucodendrinae, and is therefore placed alone in subtribe Adenanthinae. The placement of Adenanthos in Proteaceae can be summarised as follows:

Family Proteaceae

Subfamily Bellendenoideae (1 genus)
Subfamily Persoonioideae (2 tribes, 5 genera)
Subfamily Symphionematoideae (2 genera)
Subfamily Proteoideae

(6 genera incertae sedis)

Tribe Conospermeae (2 subtribes, 3 genera)
Tribe Petrophileae (2 genera)
Tribe Proteeae (2 genera)
Tribe Leucadendreae

Subtribe Isopogoninae (1 genus)
Subtribe Adenanthinae

Adenanthos

Subtribe Leucadendrinae (10 genera)

Subfamily Grevilleoideae (4 tribes, 14 subtribes, 47 genera)

=== Relationships within the genus ===
The first infrageneric arrangement of Adenanthos was published in 1870 by George Bentham, in the fifth volume of his landmark Flora Australiensis. Bentham divided the genus into two sections on the basis of floral characteristics. Two species were unusual in having flowers with one sterile stamen, and perianth tubes that are curved and swollen above the middle; these were placed in A. sect. Eurylaema. The remaining twelve known species were placed in A. sect. Stenolaema.

A phenetic analysis of the genus undertaken by Ernest Charles Nelson in 1975 yielded results in which the members of A. sect. Eurylaema occurred together. Nelson therefore retained Bentham's two sections in his 1978 revision of Adenanthos, though A. sect Stenolaema was renamed to the autonym A. sect. Adenanthos in accordance with modern rules of botanical nomenclature. He further divided A. sect. Adenanthos into two subsections, A. subsect. Anaclastos and A. subsect. Adenanthos, but discarded them again in his 1995 treatment of the genus for the Flora of Australia series. By this time, the ICBN had issued a ruling that all genera ending in -anthos must be treated as having masculine gender. This resulted in orthographic changes to all species names in the genus; for example, A. obovata became A. obovatus.

Nelson's arrangement of Adenanthos is as follows:

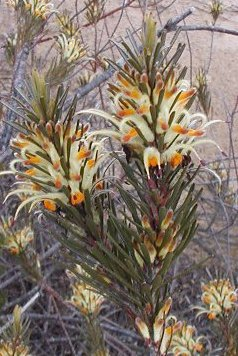
A. detmoldii

Adenanthos

A. sect. Eurylaema

A. detmoldii
A. barbiger
A. obovatus
A. × pamela

A. sect. Adenanthos

A. drummondii
A. dobagii
A. apiculatus
A. linearis
A. pungens

A. pungens subsp. pungens
A. pungens subsp. effusus

A. gracilipes
A. venosus
A. dobsonii
A. glabrescens

A. glabrescens subsp. glabrescens
A. glabrescens subsp. exasperatus

A. ellipticus
A. cuneatus
A. stictus
A. ileticos
A. forrestii
A. eyrei
A. cacomorphus
A. flavidiflorus
A. argyreus
A. macropodianus
A. terminalis
A. sericeus

A. sericeus subsp. sericeus
A. sericeus subsp. sphalma

A. × cunninghamii
A. oreophilus
A. cygnorum

A. cygnorum subsp. cygnorum
A. cygnorum subsp. chamaephyton

A. meisneri
A. velutinus
A. filifolius
A. labillardierei
A. acanthophyllus

== Species ==
- A. detmoldii
- A. barbiger
- A. obovatus
- A. × pamela
- A. drummondii
- A. dobagii
- A. apiculatus
- A. linearis
- A. pungens
- A. pungens subsp. pungens
- A. pungens subsp. effusus
- A. gracilipes
- A. venosus
- A. dobsonii
- A. glabrescens
- A. glabrescens subsp. glabrescens
- A. glabrescens subsp. exasperatus
- A. ellipticus
- A. cuneatus
- A. stictus
- A. ileticos
- A. forrestii
- A. eyrei
- A. cacomorphus
- A. flavidiflorus
- A. argyreus
- A. macropodianus
- A. terminalis
- A. sericeus
- A. sericeus subsp. sericeus
- A. sericeus subsp. sphalma
- A. × cunninghamii
- A. oreophilus
- A. cygnorum
- A. cygnorum subsp. cygnorum
- A. cygnorum subsp. chamaephyton
- A. meisneri
- A. velutinus
- A. filifolius
- A. labillardierei
- A. acanthophyllus

=== Common names ===
Nelson has published a thorough but somewhat light-hearted analysis of the common names used for this genus. He notes that the only common name applied to the genus as a whole is stick-in-jug (sometimes stick-in-the-jug), but argues that this seems to be in use only within Western Australia's Department of Conservation and Land Management (CALM; now the Department of Environment and Conservation). Be that as it may, the name dates back at least to 1970, when Western Australian State Botanist Charles Gardner gave it as the common name of Adenanthos in the second edition of John Stanley Beard's A Descriptive Catalogue of West Australian Plants.

Nelson also notes that the phrase stick-in-jug does not appear in any common name of a species. The common names of species are instead based around several other generic terms that do not apply to the genus as a whole:

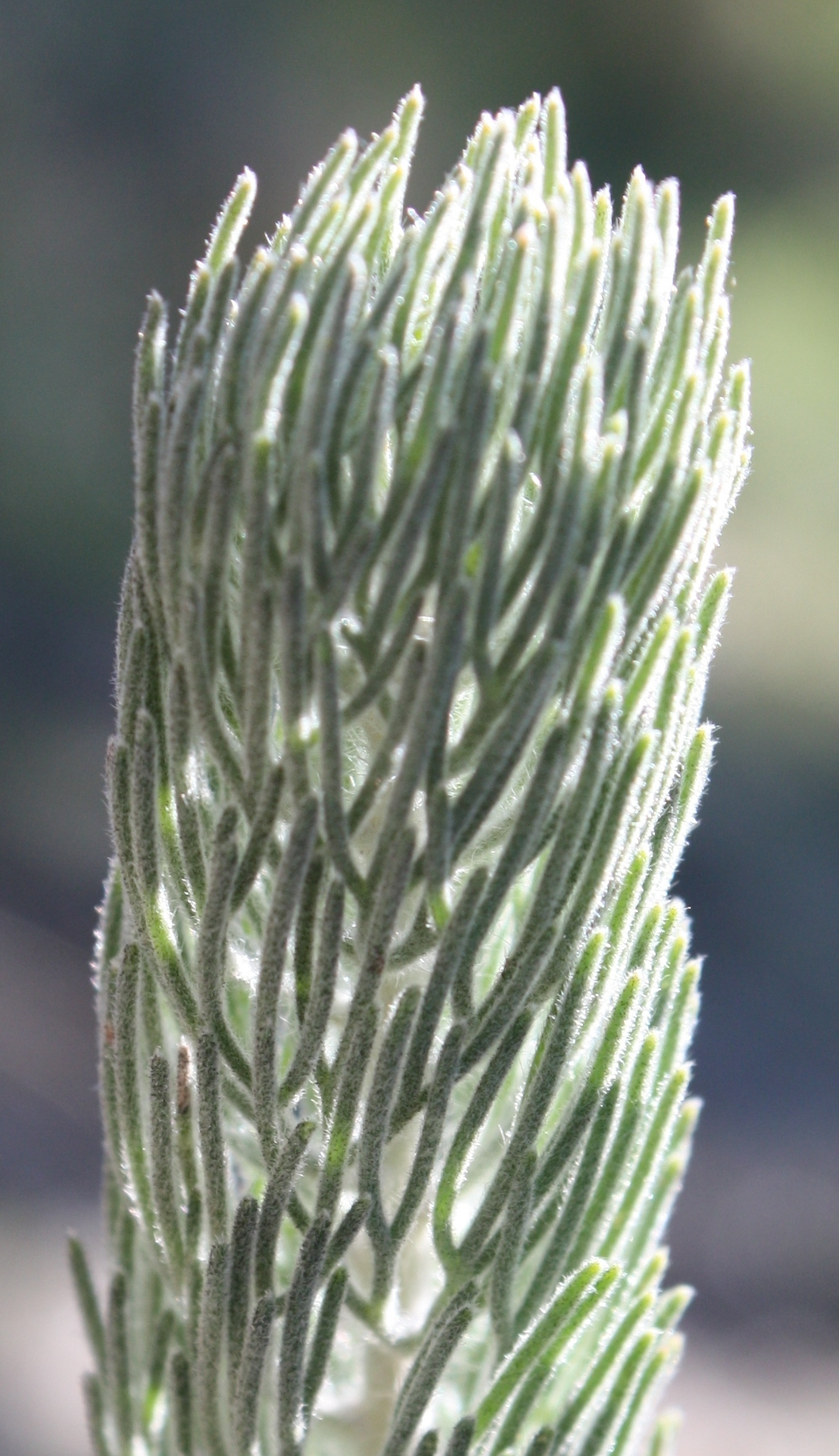
Closeup of a branch tip of A. cygnorum

- Thirteen species of Adenanthos have leaves deeply divided into long, soft, slender laciniae, often covered in a fine down of soft hairs, giving them a soft, silky feel, in stark contrast to the sclerophyllous plants that dominate both the geographic range and taxonomic family of Adenanthos. These are collectively known as woollybushes, and many of these species contain woollybush in their common names.
- Those species that lack the leaves characteristic of woollybushes usually have common names based on the term jugflower, or, in one case, the semantically similar basket flower.
- However these common names appear to be in use exclusively in Western Australia, as the two species of Adenanthos that occur outside Western Australia are both woollybushes, yet have common names based on the term gland flower, which is also used in the common name of A. barbiger (hairy glandflower), a Western Australia jugflower species.
- Finally, several species, mostly rare and endangered, have been given common names based on the genus name adenanthos itself; for example A. ileticos (Toolinna Adenanthos).

== Distribution and habitat ==
The centre of diversity for the genus is Southwest Western Australia, to which 31 of the 33 species are endemic. The south coast of Western Australia, between the Stirling Range and the Fitzgerald River area, is particular diverse, with 17 species occurring on the Esperance Plains alone. This is one of two areas dominated by kwongan heath, a vegetation complex renowned for its species richness and high levels of endemism; the other area of kwongan, further north on the west coast around Mount Lesueur, harbours surprisingly few Adenanthos species.

Species occur throughout most of the southwest. In northern areas, where there are fewer species, the genus does not extend into drier inland areas, being absent from northern parts of the Avon Wheatbelt region. To the south, however, they extend well inland, extending even beyond the southwest into the neighbouring desert: A. argyreus occurs as far inland as Southern Cross.

Eastwards along the south coast, the genus occurs in disjunct populations on isolated pockets of siliceous sand surrounded by the calcareous soils of the Great Australian Bight. The most easterly occurrence in Western Australia is at Twilight Cove.

The two species that occur outside southwest Western Australia are Adenanthos macropodianus (Kangaroo Island glandflower), which is endemic to Kangaroo Island; and Adenanthos terminalis (yellow glandflower), which occurs in South Australia on the Eyre Peninsula and Kangaroo Island, and from Adelaide eastwards into western Victoria.

== Ecology ==
A range of honeyeater species have been observed feeding at Adenanthos flowers, including Acanthorhynchus tenuirostris (eastern spinebill), Anthochaera chrysoptera (little wattlebird), Phylidonyris pyrrhoptera (crescent honeyeater), Phylidonyris novaehollandiae (New Holland honeyeater), Gliciphila melanops (tawny-crowned honeyeater), Zosterops lateralis (silvereye) and Melithreptus brevirostris (brown-headed honeyeater). One study found that the amount of time that birds spent feeding at a site was strongly correlated with the abundance of Banksia sessilis (parrotbush), and seemed unrelated to the amount of Adenanthos there; yet these birds nonetheless fed at Adenanthos flowers.
