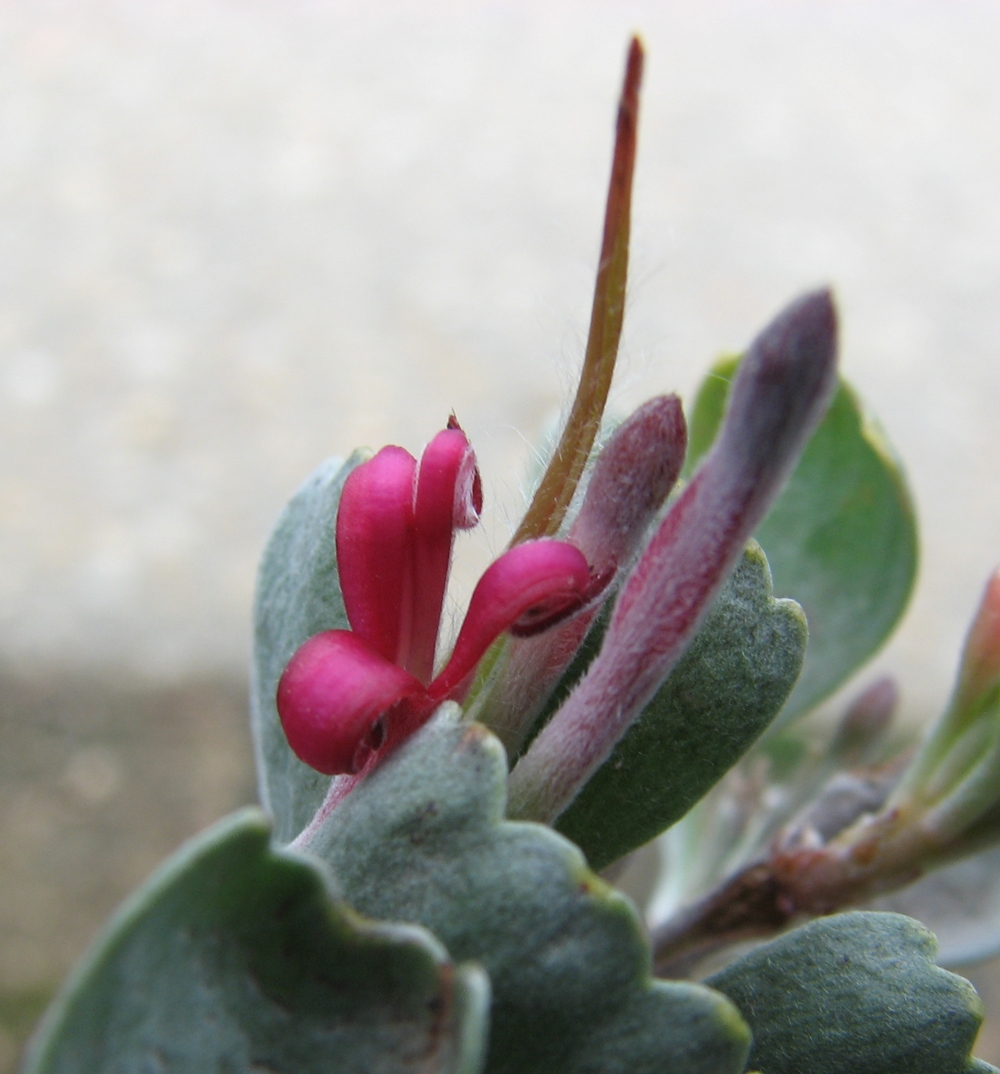
- Inflorescence and foliage of A. cuneatus (Coastal Jugflower), the type species of A. sect. Adenanthos

Scientific classification
- Kingdom: Plantae
- Clade: Tracheophytes
- Clade: Angiosperms
- Clade: Eudicots
- Order: Proteales
- Family: Proteaceae
- Genus: Adenanthos; Labill.
- Section: Adenanthos sect. Adenanthos

Species
- 29 species; see text.

Synonyms
- Adenanthos sect. Stenolaema Benth.

= Adenanthos sect. Adenanthos =

Taxonomic section of plants in the genus Proteaceae

Adenanthos sect. Adenanthos is a taxonomic section of the flowering plant genus Adenanthos (Proteaceae). It comprises 29 species. The centre of diversity is southwest Western Australia, with two species extending into South Australia and western Victoria.

== Description ==
The section is characterised by flowers in which the perianth is straight, at least at first; all four stamens are fertile; and the style end is narrow, and conical or cylindrical.

== Taxonomy ==
The section was first described and published by George Bentham in the 1870 fifth volume of his landmark work Flora Australiensis, under the name Adenanthos sect. Stenolaema. Bentham listed several diagnostic characters for the species including the straight perianth-tube; the fertility of all four anthers; and the narrow style-end. At the time of publication it contained 12 species.

Bentham did not specify a type species for A. sect. Stenolaena, but in modern times this is of no import, as the section contains the type species of the genus, A. obovatus, and must therefore have the same type; the section was formally lectotypified in this way by Ernest Charles Nelson in 1978. For the same reason, the modern laws of botanical nomenclature require the section to take the autonym Adenanthos sect. Adenanthos; thus A. sect. Stenolaena is now considered a nomenclatural synonym of A. sect. Adenanthos.

In 1978, Nelson published a comprehensive taxonomic revision of Adenanthos. He retained A. sect. Adenanthos, making no change to its circumscription, except that there were by this time 29 species assignable to it. He further divided the section into two subsections, A. subsect. Anaclastos and A. subsect. Adenanthos, but subsequently discarded them in his 1995 treatment of Adenanthos for the Flora of Australia series of monographs.

The placement and circumscription of A. sect. Adenanthos in Nelson's arrangement of Adenanthos may be summarised as follows:

Adenanthos

A. sect. Eurylaema (4 species)
A. sect. Adenanthos

A. drummondii
A. dobagii
A. apiculatus
A. linearis
A. pungens (2 subspecies)
A. gracilipes
A. venosus
A. dobsonii
A. glabrescens (2 subspecies)
A. ellipticus
A. cuneatus
A. stictus
A. ileticos
A. forrestii
A. eyrei
A. cacomorphus
A. flavidiflorus
A. argyreus
A. macropodianus
A. terminalis
A. sericeus (2 subspecies)
A. × cunninghamii
A. oreophilus
A. cygnorum (2 subspecies)
A. meisneri
A. velutinus
A. filifolius
A. labillardierei
A. acanthophyllus

== Distribution and habitat ==
27 of the 29 species in this section are endemic to southwest Western Australia. A. macropodianus is endemic to Kangaroo Island in South Australia; and A. terminalis ranges from the Eyre Peninsula in South Australia, east to western parts of Victoria.
