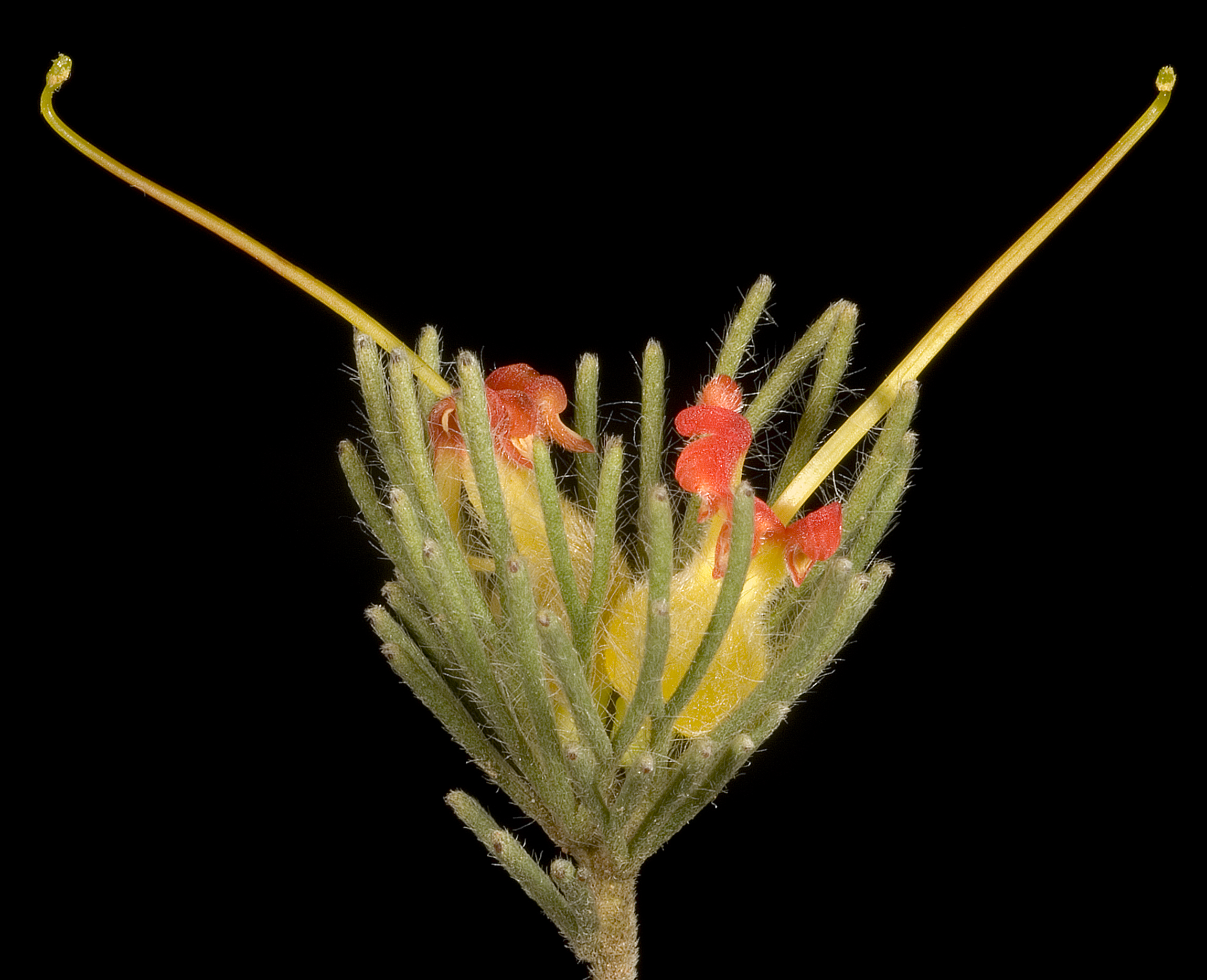

Scientific classification
- Kingdom: Plantae
- Clade: Tracheophytes
- Clade: Angiosperms
- Clade: Eudicots
- Order: Proteales
- Family: Proteaceae
- Genus: Adenanthos
- Section: Adenanthos sect. Adenanthos
- Species: A. drummondii

Binomial name
- Adenanthos drummondii Labill.

= Adenanthos drummondii =

Species of shrub native to Western Australia

Adenanthos drummondii is a shrub of the family Proteaceae, native to the south coast of Western Australia. Within the genus Adenanthos, it lies in the section Adenanthos and is most closely related to A. stictus.
