= Adenanthos apiculatus =

Conservation status
- Near Threatened (IUCN 3.1)

Scientific classification
- Kingdom: Plantae
- Clade: Tracheophytes
- Clade: Angiosperms
- Clade: Eudicots
- Order: Proteales
- Family: Proteaceae
- Genus: Adenanthos
- Section: Adenanthos sect. Adenanthos
- Species: A. apiculatus

Binomial name
- Adenanthos apiculatus R.Br.

Species of shrub native to Western Australia

Adenanthos apiculatus is a shrub of the family Proteaceae, native to the south coast of Western Australia. Within the genus Adenanthos, it lies in the section Adenanthos and has had only 29 records of occurrence.
