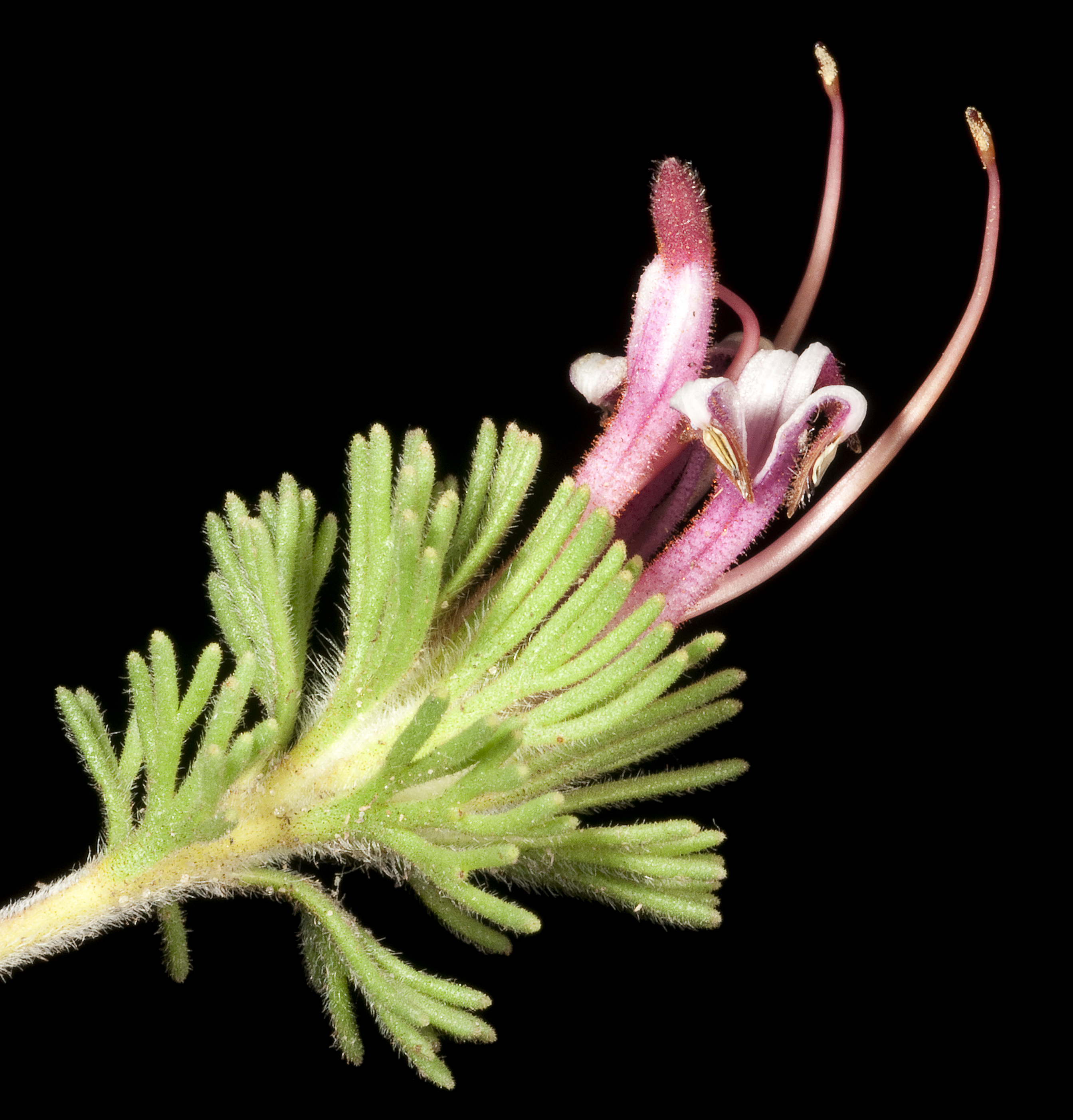

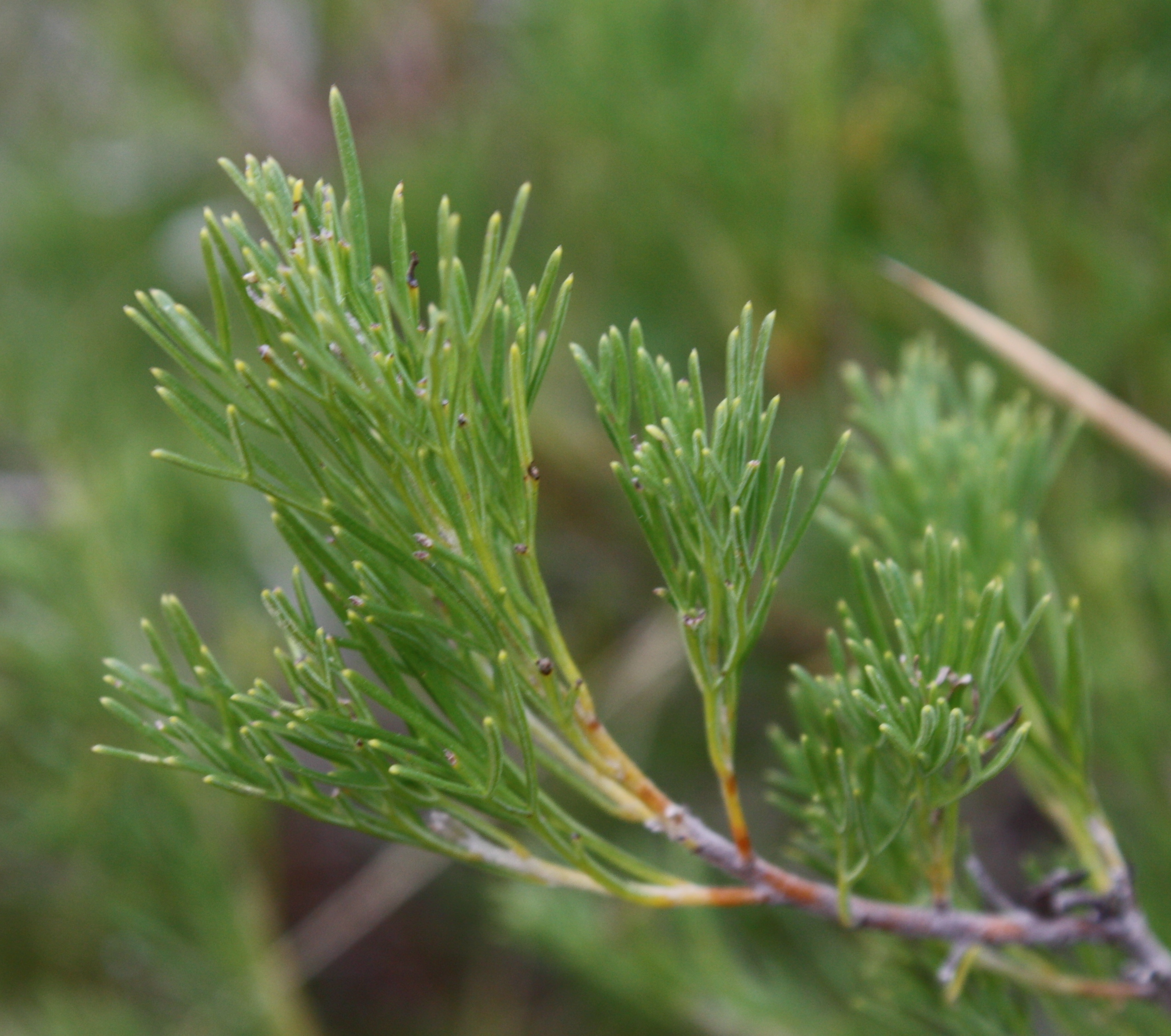

Scientific classification
- Kingdom: Plantae
- Clade: Tracheophytes
- Clade: Angiosperms
- Clade: Eudicots
- Order: Proteales
- Family: Proteaceae
- Genus: Adenanthos
- Section: Adenanthos sect. Adenanthos
- Species: A. meisneri

Binomial name
- Adenanthos meisneri Lehm. ex Meisn.

= Adenanthos meisneri =

Species of shrub endemic to Western Australia

Adenanthos meisneri, commonly known as prostrate woollybush, is a species of shrub in the family Proteaceae. It is endemic to the south-west of Western Australia.

== Description ==
It usually grows to 1 metre (3 ft 3 in) high and has leaves are up to 80 mm (3.1 in) in length and about 7 mm wide. The flowers appear predominantly between September and December in the species' native range. These have a red-purple to pale violet perianth (up to 30 mm long) and glandular hairs. The style is up to 40 mm (1.6 in) long.

== Etymology ==
The species was first formally described in 1845 by botanist Johann Lehmann in Plantae Preissianae The type specimen was collected from the foot of the Darling Scarp by Ludwig Preiss in 1839.

It is susceptible to Phytophthora cinnamomi dieback.
