= Adenanthos pungens =

Scientific classification
- Kingdom: Plantae
- Clade: Tracheophytes
- Clade: Angiosperms
- Clade: Eudicots
- Order: Proteales
- Family: Proteaceae
- Genus: Adenanthos
- Section: Adenanthos sect. Adenanthos
- Species: A. pungens

Binomial name
- Adenanthos pungens Meisn.

Species of shrub endemic to Western Australia

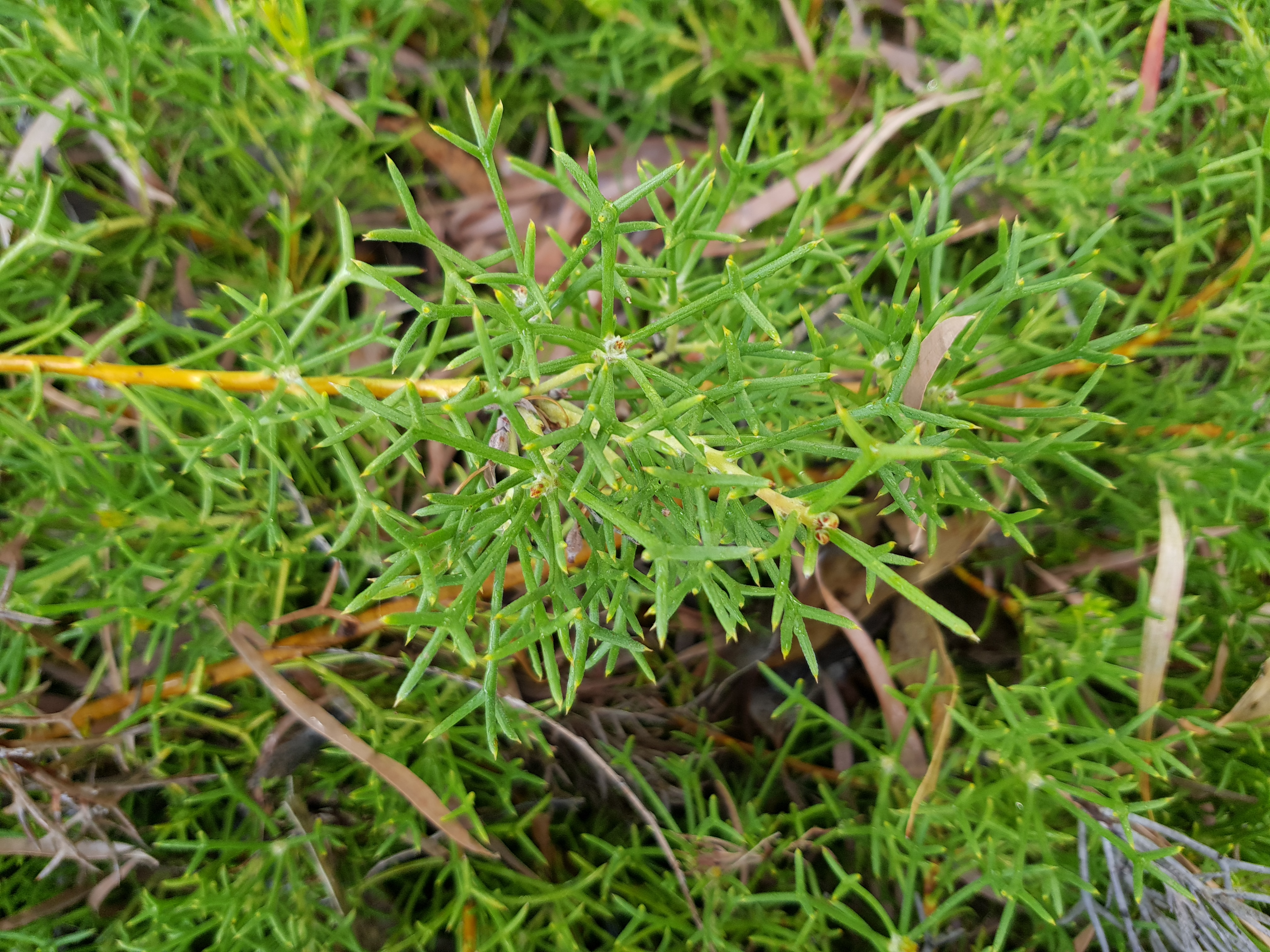
Adenanthos pungens ssp. effusus

Adenanthos pungens, the spiky adenanthos, is a species of shrub in the family Proteaceae. It is endemic to the south-west of Western Australia.

== Description ==
The species may be prostrate or erect in habit. The stiff, prickly and terete leaves are 30 mm (1.2 in) in length and 1 to 2 mm in diameter. The flowers appear in clusters at the ends of the branchlets. These have a 30 mm long perianth which is either pale pink and cream or deeper pink. Styles are about 40 mm (1.6 in) long, with or without hairs at the tips.

The species was first formally described in 1845 in Plantae Preissianae by Carl Meissner.

=== Subspecies ===
There are two recognised subspecies:

- A. pungens subsp. effusus – erect habit with dark pink flowers.
- A. pungens subsp. pungens – prostrate habit with pale pink flowers.

Both subspecies are highly susceptible to Phytophthora cinnamomi dieback.
