= Adenanthos flavidiflorus =

Scientific classification
- Kingdom: Plantae
- Clade: Tracheophytes
- Clade: Angiosperms
- Clade: Eudicots
- Order: Proteales
- Family: Proteaceae
- Genus: Adenanthos
- Section: Adenanthos sect. Adenanthos
- Species: A. flavidiflorus

Binomial name
- Adenanthos flavidiflorus F.Muell.

Species of shrub native to Western Australia

Adenanthos flavidiflorus is a shrub of the family Proteaceae native to Western Australia.
