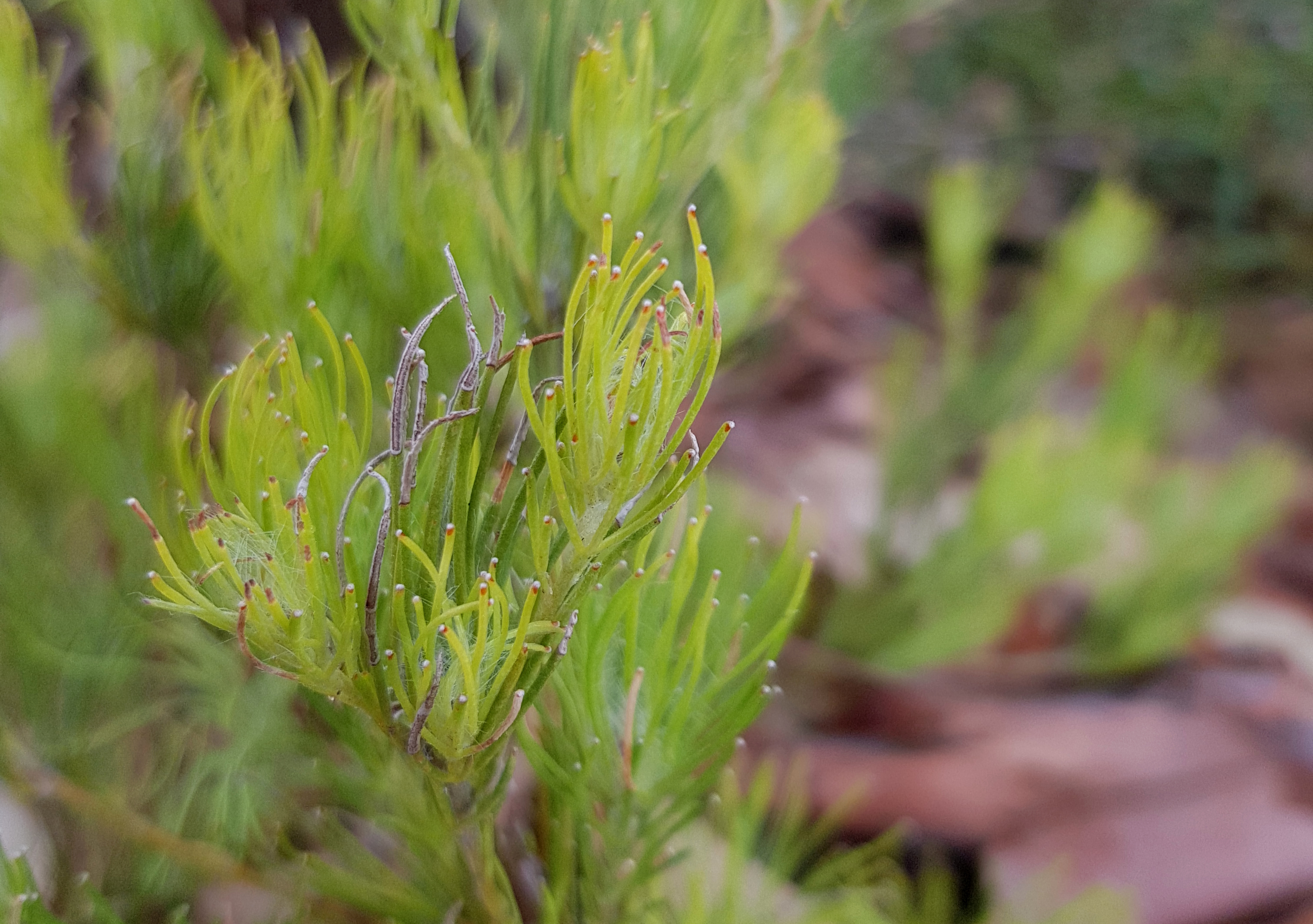

Conservation status
- Vulnerable (IUCN 3.1)

Scientific classification
- Kingdom: Plantae
- Clade: Embryophytes
- Clade: Tracheophytes
- Clade: Spermatophytes
- Clade: Angiosperms
- Clade: Eudicots
- Order: Proteales
- Family: Proteaceae
- Genus: Adenanthos
- Section: Adenanthos sect. Adenanthos
- Species: A. linearis

Binomial name
- Adenanthos linearis Meisn.

= Adenanthos linearis =

Species of shrub native to Western Australia

Adenanthos linearis is a shrub of the family Proteaceae, native to the south coast of Western Australia. Within the genus Adenanthos, it lies in the section Adenanthos and has had only 14 known occurrences; only five of which have exact coordinates.
