= Adenanthos gracilipes =

Scientific classification
- Kingdom: Plantae
- Clade: Tracheophytes
- Clade: Angiosperms
- Clade: Eudicots
- Order: Proteales
- Family: Proteaceae
- Genus: Adenanthos
- Section: Adenanthos sect. Adenanthos
- Species: A. gracilipes

Binomial name
- Adenanthos gracilipes A.S.George

Species of shrub native to Western Australia

Adenanthos gracilipes is a shrub of the family Proteaceae native to Western Australia.
