= Adenanthos dobsonii =

Scientific classification
- Kingdom: Plantae
- Clade: Embryophytes
- Clade: Tracheophytes
- Clade: Spermatophytes
- Clade: Angiosperms
- Clade: Eudicots
- Order: Proteales
- Family: Proteaceae
- Genus: Adenanthos
- Section: Adenanthos sect. Adenanthos
- Species: A. dobsonii

Binomial name
- Adenanthos dobsonii F.Muell.

Species of flowering plant endemic to Australia

Adenanthos forrestii is a flowering plant from the family Proteaceae that can be found in Western Australia where it Declared to be Rare Flora. It is 0.5–1.5 metres (1 ft 8 in – 4 ft 11 in) high and have either red or creamy-yellow coloured flowers.
