= Adenanthos filifolius =

Scientific classification
- Kingdom: Plantae
- Clade: Tracheophytes
- Clade: Angiosperms
- Clade: Eudicots
- Order: Proteales
- Family: Proteaceae
- Genus: Adenanthos
- Section: Adenanthos sect. Adenanthos
- Species: A. filifolius

Binomial name
- Adenanthos filifolius Benth.

Species of shrub endemic to Western Australia

Adenanthos filifolius is a species of erect shrub endemic to southwest Western Australia. It was first described by George Bentham in 1870.
