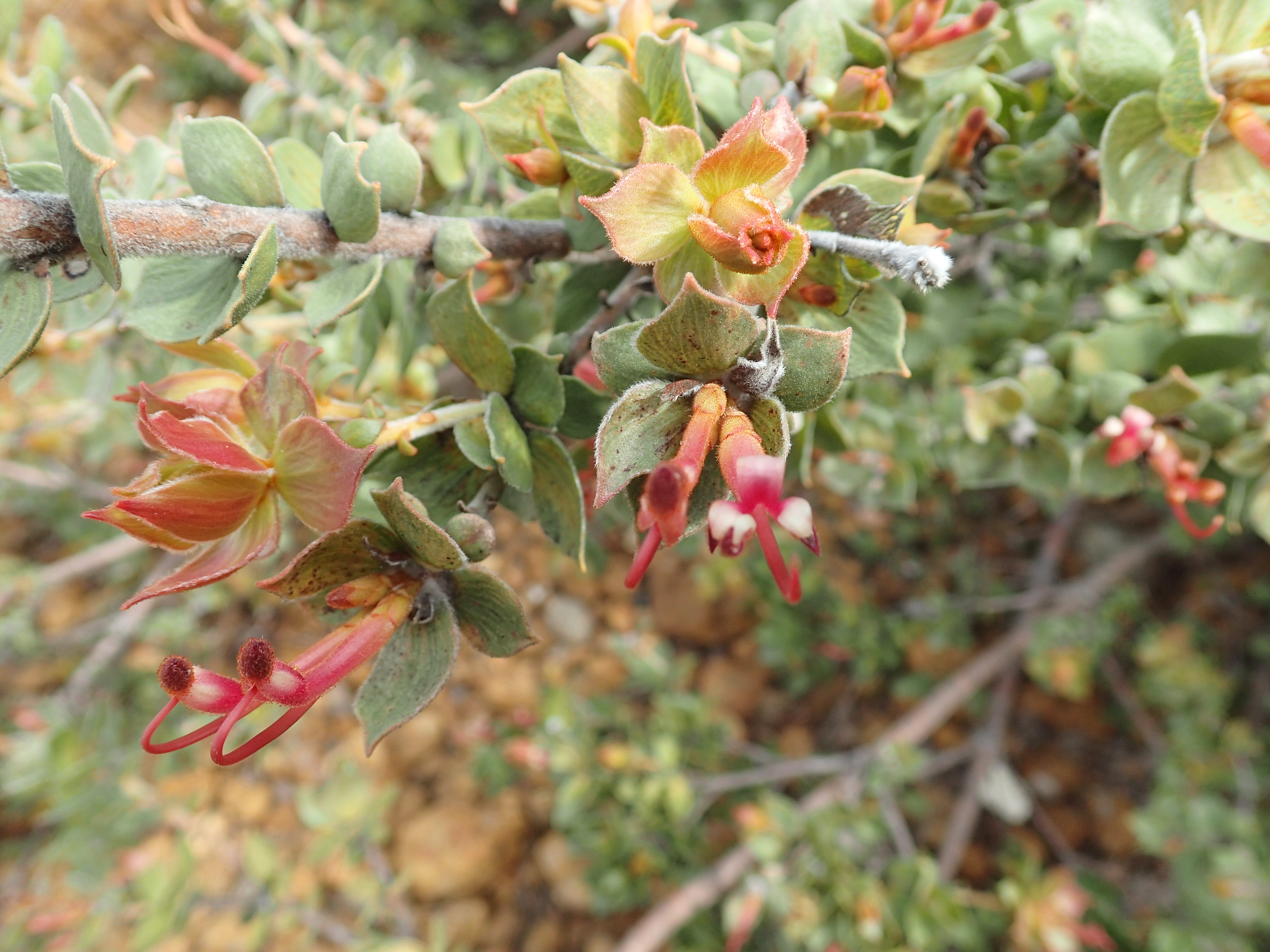

Scientific classification
- Kingdom: Plantae
- Clade: Tracheophytes
- Clade: Angiosperms
- Clade: Eudicots
- Order: Proteales
- Family: Proteaceae
- Genus: Adenanthos
- Section: Adenanthos sect. Adenanthos
- Species: A. venosus

Binomial name
- Adenanthos venosus Meisn.

= Adenanthos venosus =

Species of flowering plant native to Western Australia

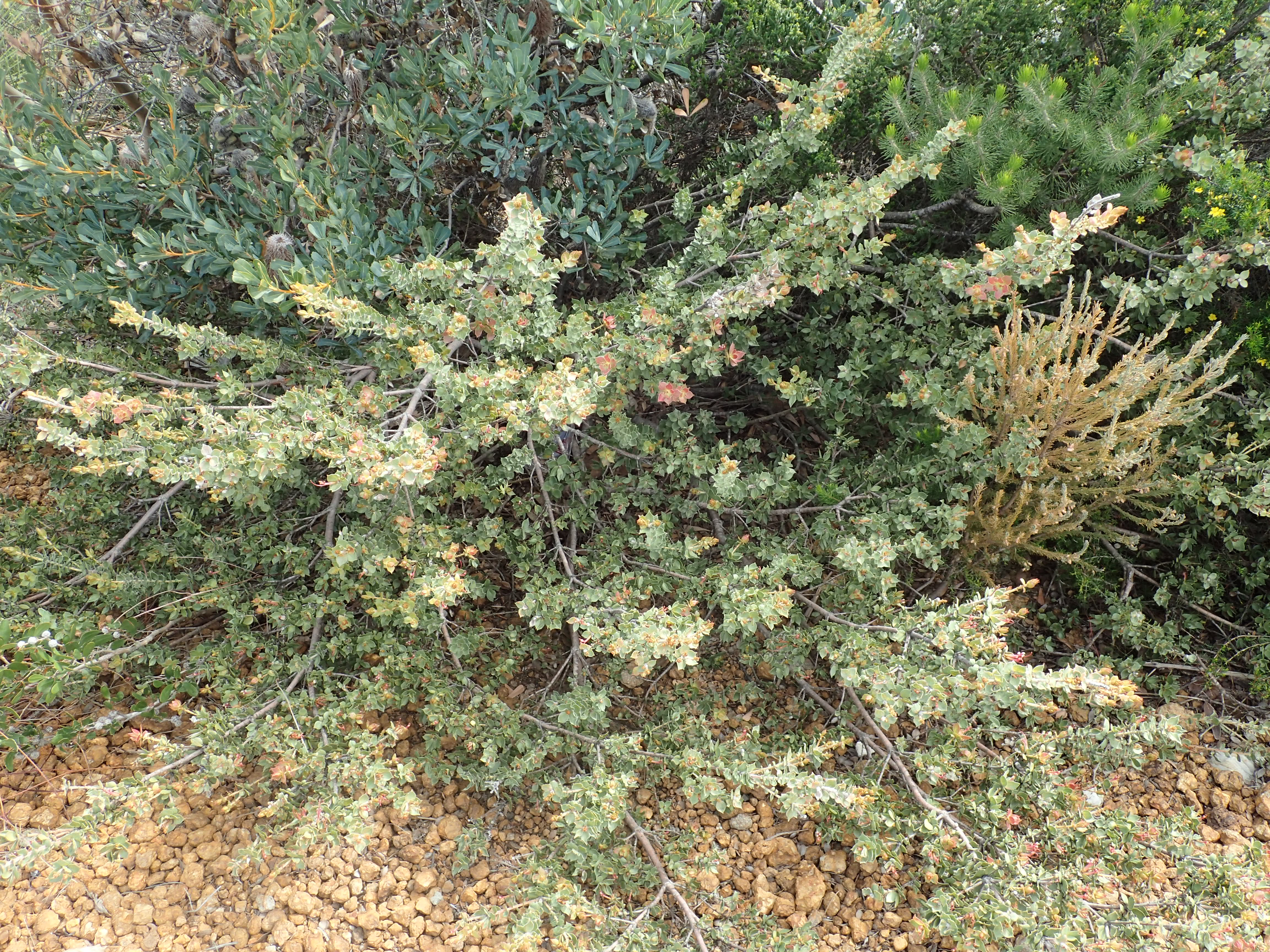
Habit in the Fitzgerald River National Park

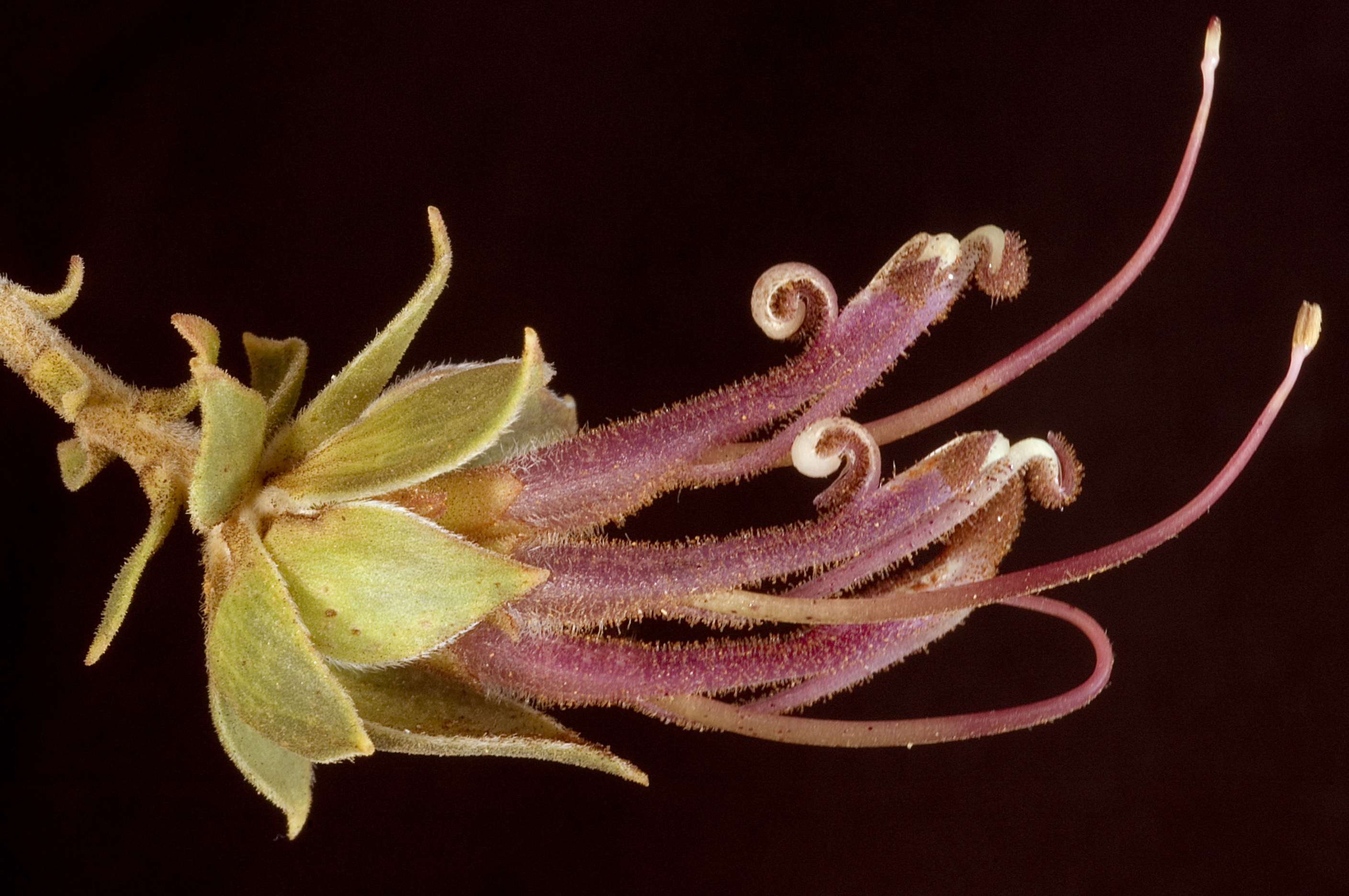
Flower detail

Adenanthos venosus is a species of flowering plant in the family Proteaceae and is endemic to a restricted part of the southwest of Western Australia. It is an openly-branched shrub with clustered egg-shaped leaves and reddish flowers.

== Description ==
Adenanthos venosus is an openly-branched shrub that typically grows to a height of 1–2 m (3 ft 3 in – 6 ft 7 in) and forms a lignotuber. Its leaves are mostly arranged in clusters at the ends of branches, egg-shaped, sometimes with the narrower end towards the base, mostly 15–20 mm (0.59–0.79 in) long, 10 mm (0.39 in) wide and sessile. The leaves are mostly glabrous and have a pointed tip. The flowers are dull crimson to pinkish purple with a cream-coloured band in the centre and many glandular hairs on the outside. The perianth is about 25 mm (0.98 in) long and the style about 40 mm (1.6 in) long and glabrous. Flowering occurs from August to November.

== Taxonomy ==
Adenanthos venosus was first formally described in 1856 by Carl Meissner in de Candolle's Prodromus Systematis Naturalis Regni Vegetabilis from specimens collected by James Drummond in the Swan River Colony. The specific epithet (venosus) means "with prominent veins".

== Distribution ==
This species grows among quartzite rocks and on rocky sandstone ridges in the Fitzgerald River National Park in the south-west of Western Australia.

== Conservation status ==
This adenanthos is list as "not threatened" by the Western Australian Government Department of Biodiversity, Conservation and Attractions.
