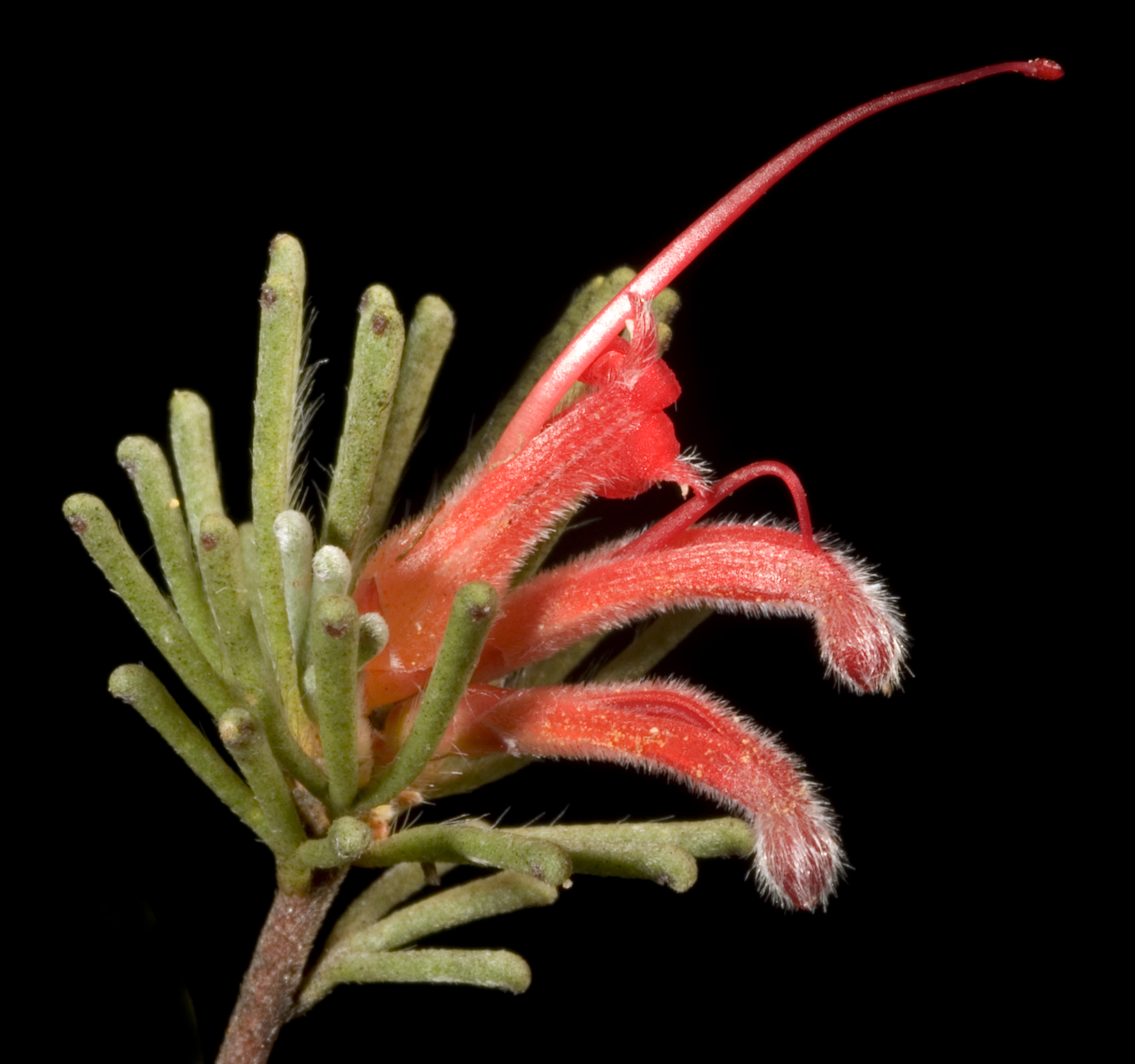

Scientific classification
- Kingdom: Plantae
- Clade: Tracheophytes
- Clade: Angiosperms
- Clade: Eudicots
- Order: Proteales
- Family: Proteaceae
- Genus: Adenanthos
- Section: Adenanthos sect. Adenanthos
- Species: A. argyreus

Binomial name
- Adenanthos argyreus Diels

= Adenanthos argyreus =

Species of shrub endemic to Western Australia

Adenanthos argyreus, commonly known as little woollybush, is a species of erect shrub endemic to southwest Western Australia.

The shrub has an erect and compact habit and typically grows to a height of 1.2 metres (4 ft). It blooms between May and February producing pink-red flowers.

It is found among areas of low scrub in the southern Wheatbelt and Goldfields–Esperance regions of Western Australia where it grows in sandy-clay soils that can contain gravel.
