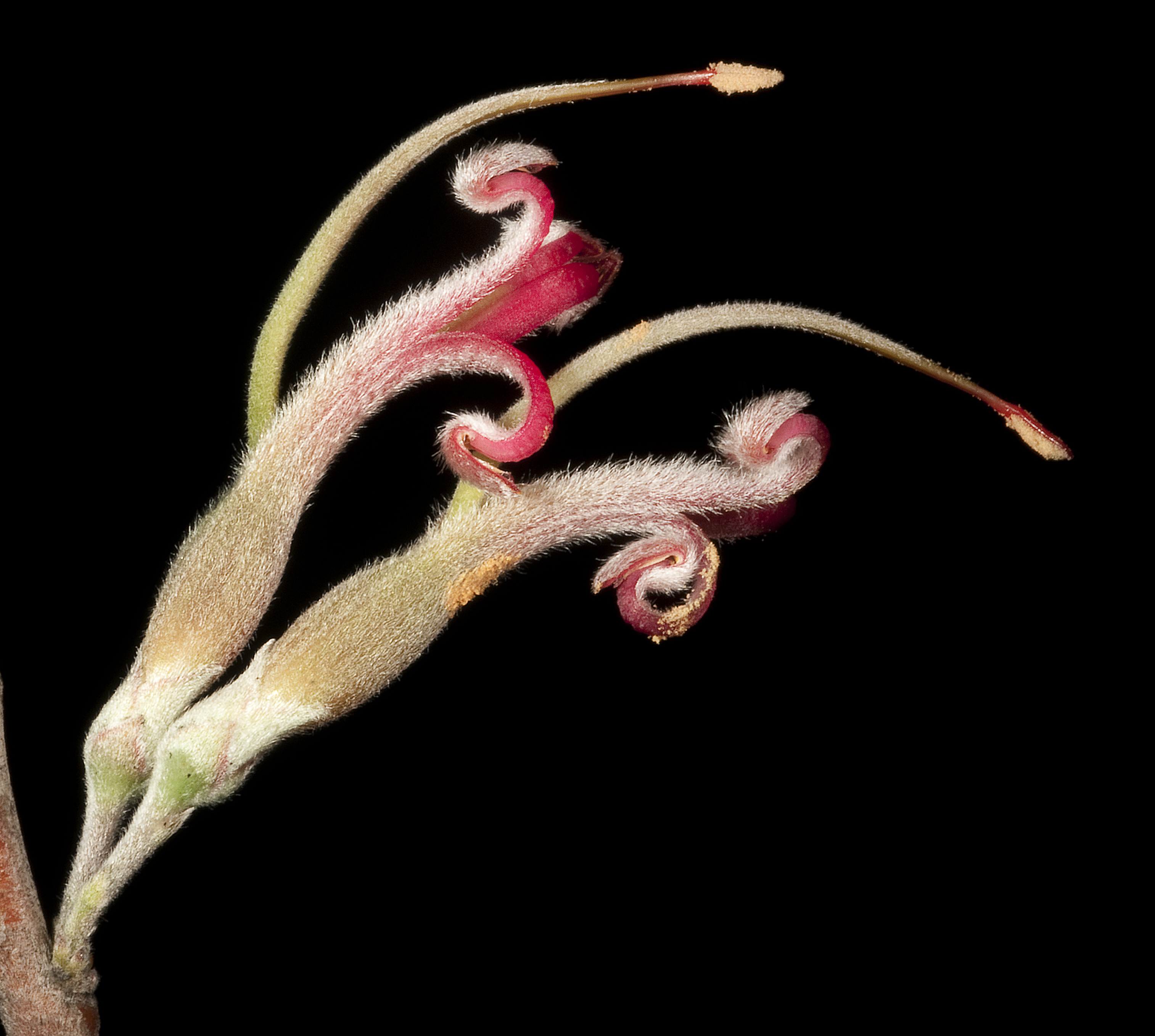

Scientific classification
- Kingdom: Plantae
- Clade: Tracheophytes
- Clade: Angiosperms
- Clade: Eudicots
- Order: Proteales
- Family: Proteaceae
- Genus: Adenanthos
- Section: Adenanthos sect. Adenanthos
- Species: A. stictus

Binomial name
- Adenanthos stictus A.S.George

= Adenanthos stictus =

Species of shrub native to Western Australia

Adenanthos cuneatus is a shrub of the family Proteaceae, native to the south coast of Western Australia. It was described by Alex George in 1974.
