= Albany woollybush =

Albany woollybush refers to two related flowering plants in family Proteaceae, native to southwestern Australia. The plants are named after Albany, Western Australia.

- Adenanthos sericeus
- Adenanthos × cunninghamii, a hybrid between Adenanthos sericeus and Adenanthos cuneatus.
Plants named Albany woollybush
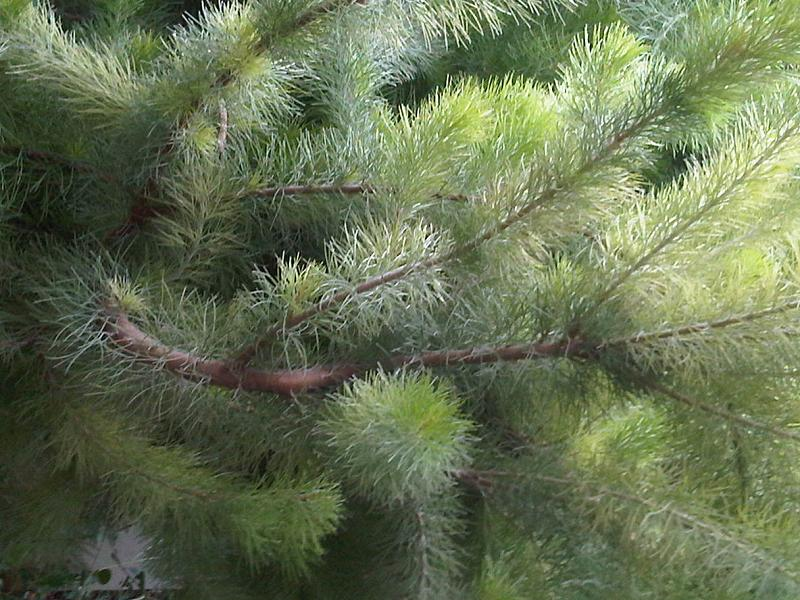
Adenanthos sericeus

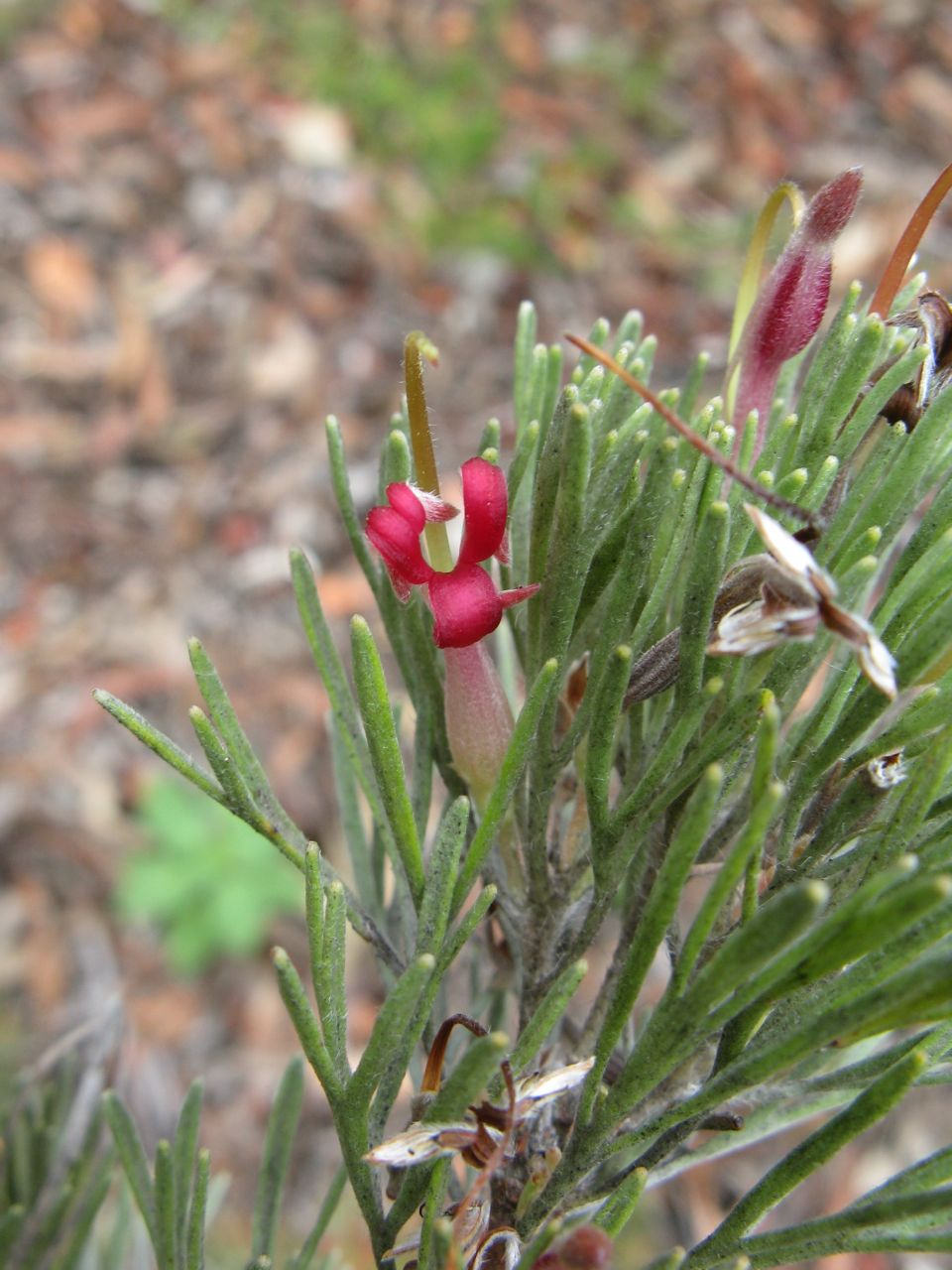
Adenanthos × cunninghamii

== See also ==
- Woollybush
- Adenanthos
