= Gland flower =

Gland flower is a common name for several plants and may refer to:

- Adenanthos macropodianus
- Adenanthos terminalis
