= Torbay Inlet =

Inlet in Western Australia

Coordinates: 35.030°S 117.682°E

Torbay Inlet is an estuarine inlet in the Great Southern region of Western Australia situated approximately 40 kilometres (25 mi) east of the town of Denmark, Western Australia.

Torbay Inlet is a wave-dominated estuary that functions primarily as a result of wave energy. The estuary has been severely modified as most of the natural catchment cover has been cleared.

Covering a total surface area of 3.1 square kilometres (1 sq mi), 2.1 square kilometres (1 sq mi) of this is the central basin with the remainder being composed of saltmarsh and tidal delta. The lagoon is quite shallow and fringed with sedges and paperbarks.

The inlet outflows into the Southern Ocean and is part of the Torbay Inlet and Lake Powell Catchment Area.

Much of the land surrounding the inlet has an elevation of less than 1 metre (3 ft) so that under certain tidal and wind conditions the land is inundated with sea water that floods back up the estuary. As a result, in 1912, a barrage with floodgates was constructed to prevent this, but this proved to be unsuccessful.

A sandbar exists across the mouth of the estuary for most of the year, but it is often breached following significant rain events.

Trekkers on the Bibbulmun Track use the either the sandbar to cross the inlet or an alternative route using the Lower Denmark Road to go around the inlet.

== Catchment ==
The catchment area is one of the most altered on the South Coast. The inlet drains a large swampland area that includes Lake Powell, Lake Manarup, Five Mile Swamp, Seven Mile Swamp and Marbelup Brook along with a number of man-made agricultural drains.

The area of the catchment is 330 square kilometres (127 sq mi) of which 55% has been cleared and contains 244 kilometres (152 mi) of water ways.

Some swampland in the lower catchment was drained to open land for agriculture. Unfortunately this exposed pyrite in the soil that oxidised in the open air rendering the soil acid and infertile.

== Watershed Torbay ==
Watershed Torbay was a four-year project which planned and implemented a restoration plan for the Torbay Catchment. The Torbay catchment Group is the community group that formed in 1999 to implement the restoration plan. The activities of the group include establishing and repairing fencing around the waterway, Watsonia control and Wetland construction for nutrient stripping.
