= Cliff-top dune =

Dune that occurs on the top of a cliff

Cliff-top dunes, also known as perched dunes, are dunes that occur on the tops of cliffs. They are uncommon in most parts of the world, because they only develop under unusual geomorphological conditions. Processes by which they may be formed include:

- a dune advances up a pre-existing slope, which is then eroded to form a cliff;
- a dune forms during a period of high sea level, then sea level drops, exposing a cliff face.

They are most often seen as coastal landforms, but can also occur along lakes and rivers, and in deserts. Places where they are relatively common include the west coast of Jutland, Denmark. They can also be found in certain places along the shores of the Great Lakes in Michigan, including the Grand Sable Dunes in Pictured Rocks National Lakeshore and in the Sleeping Bear Dunes National Lakeshore, most dramatically on South Manitou Island.
