= Adenanthos forrestii =

Conservation status
- Near Threatened (IUCN 3.1)

Scientific classification
- Kingdom: Plantae
- Clade: Tracheophytes
- Clade: Angiosperms
- Clade: Eudicots
- Order: Proteales
- Family: Proteaceae
- Genus: Adenanthos
- Section: Adenanthos sect. Adenanthos
- Species: A. forrestii

Binomial name
- Adenanthos forrestii F.Muell.

Species of flowering plant from Western Australia

Adenanthos forrfstii is a flowering plant from the family Proteaceae that can be found in Western Australia where it is declared to be rare flora. It is 0.3–1.3 metres (1 ft 0 in – 4 ft 3 in) high and have either red or creamy-yellow coloured flowers. The flowers remain in such colour from April to June and then become greyish-white from August to September. It can be found on coastal dunes and limestone.
