= Katherine Cummings =

Australian librarian and transgender activist

Katherine Cummings (1935–2022) was an Australian librarian, writer, editor and transgender activist.

== Early life and career ==
Cummings was born in Scotland in 1935, and grew up in several Pacific Islands including the Gilbert Islands, Fiji, New Zealand, and Australia. She graduated from the University of Sydney, where she met the writer Clive James who would later credit Cummings for starting his career in publishing. After Sydney, Cummings trained as a librarian at the University of Toronto. After graduating she worked at the University of New South Wales, followed by positions at State Library of Oregon and Upsala College in New Jersey, before returning to Australia where she worked at the University of Queensland. Cummings became the head librarian at the Sydney College of the Arts, and later moved to Macquarie University and University of New South Wales.

== Transgender experience ==
She underwent gender-affirming surgery in Australia, in 1986 when she was 51 years old and named herself after Katharine Hepburn. The surgeon Peter Haertsch performing the surgery. In the late 1980s, Norman Swan conducted a series of interviews with Cummings on her transitioning from male to female. Swan later interviewed Cummings to talk about how her life progressed in the time between the 1980s and 2013. Her transition is also discussed in the 2003 book Gender trouble down under by David Coad. Cummings wrote about her experience returning to a school reunion forty years after she graduated, and the varied responses of her former classmates.

Cummings petitioned the Australian Immigration Department to legally change her name and pay for electrolysis treatments needed for her transitioning, actions that led the way for others to receive similar benefits. In her work at Sydney's Gender Centre she helped people access resources needed. She started as the editor of Polare, the center's magazine in 2001. Cummings spoke about her experiences as transgender during the 2011 Australian Transgender Day of Remembrance.

Cummings was a regular visitor to Casa Susanna, a camp in upstate New York that welcomed cross dressing men and transgender women, where she went by the name Fiona. Her presence in the 2005 book, Casa Susanna, was part of the inspiration for Harvey Fierstein's 2014 play Casa Valentina. Cummings was in the 2023 documentary Casa Susanna after being interviewed by Sébastien Lifshitz about her experiences at Casa Susanna.

== Writings ==
Cummings published two books. Katherine's Diary: the story of a transsexual, which was a winner of the Australian Human Rights Award for Non-Fiction Literature Award in 1992. Her second book was The life and loves of a transgendered lesbian librarian and other essays, stories and verse. She edited a collection of short stories, No Thanks or Regrets, and her 1998 short story, A Tale of Nine Cats, was on the short list for the 1989 Ditmar Awards.

== Personal life ==
Cummings was married for twenty-five years, with three daughters from the marriage. She describes the loss of family as a major loss that resulted from her transitioning from male to female, though she describes one of her daughters as her best friend.

Cummings died on January 26, 2022.
