= 2009 Queen's Birthday Honours (Australia) =

The Queen's Birthday Honours 2009 were appointments Australian honours system to recognise and reward good works by citizens of Australia and other nations that contribute to Australia. The Birthday Honours are awarded as part of the Queen's Official Birthday celebrations and were announced on 8 June 2009 in Australia.

The recipients of honours are displayed as they were styled before their new honour and arranged by honour with grades and then divisions i.e. Civil, Diplomatic and Military as appropriate.

† indicates an award given posthumously.

== Order of Australia ==
=== Companion (AC) ===
==== General Division ====
- Mr Malcolm Alexander Kinnaird AO, of South Australia. For service through the development of public policy in the defence procurement, infrastructure and energy sectors, and to business.
- His Excellency the Honourable Peter George Underwood AO, of Tasmania. For service to the judiciary, to legal scholarship and administration, to law reform in the areas of civil and criminal procedure, and to the community of Tasmania.
- Ms Carla Zampatti-Spender AM, of New South Wales. For service through leadership and management roles in the fashion and retail property sectors, to multicultural broadcasting, and to women as a role model and mentor.*

=== Officer (AO) ===
==== General Division ====
- Mr David William Borthwick, PSM, of The Australian Capital Territory. For service to the development of environmental policy, particularly in relation to climate change, water allocation, emissions trading and heritage issues.
- The Honourable Paul Henry Calvert, of Tasmania. For service to the Australian Parliament, and to the community of Tasmania, particularly through local government and the agricultural show movement.
- Ms Gillian Elizabeth Calvert, of New South Wales. For service to the community as a leading advocate in the protection of the rights and welfare of children and youth.
- Mr David Alexander Crawford, of Victoria. For service to business as a director of public companies, to sport, particularly through the review and restructure of national sporting bodies, and to the community through contributions to arts and educational organisations.
- Mr Richard (Dick) Lucas Estens, of New South Wales. For service to the community through the provision of sustainable long-term employment for Indigenous Australians, to reconciliation, and to the improvement of telecommunication services in rural, regional and remote areas.
- Ms Irene Gleeson, of New South Wales. For service to international relations, particularly through sustained aid for children affected by war and HIV/AIDS in northern Uganda.
- Professor Robert Michael Graham, of New South Wales. For service to medicine, particularly through stewardship of the Victor Chang Cardiac Research Institute and research in the field of molecular cardiology.
- Mr Allan Grantley Gyngell, of The Australian Capital Territory. For service to international relations through contributions to the development of public and governmental debate on foreign and security policy.
- Carolyn Judith Hewson, of South Australia. For service to the community through support for charitable organisations, particularly YWCA, and to business.
- Dr Bruce Edward Hobbs FAA FGSAust FTSE, of Western Australia. For service to science, particularly in the field of structural geology as a leader in the development of innovative research centres and mineral exploration technologies.
- The Honourable Justice David Hargraves Hodgson. For service to the judiciary and to the law, particularly through the Supreme Court of New South Wales.
- Professor Kurt Lambeck, of The Australian Capital Territory. For service to science through the development of policy, the promotion of educational programs and as a researcher and educator in the field of geoscience.
- Mrs Mari Ann Lewis, AM, of New South Wales. For service to the visual arts as an ambassador for Australian art, through administrative roles with arts organisations in Australia and overseas and through philanthropic contributions to galleries.
- Mr Eric Paul McClintock, of New South Wales. For service to business through leadership and management roles in the areas of finance and health, to Australian-Malaysian relations, and to public policy development.
- Dr Robert Alexander McIntosh, of New South Wales. For service to agricultural science in Australia and internationally, particularly through research in the areas of wheat genetics and rust disease and as an educator and mentor.
- Mr Rodney Ian Mitchell of Victoria. For service to the international community, particularly through the establishment of the Asia Pacific Business Coalition on HIV and AIDS in Papua New Guinea, and to financial sector management and reform.
- Professor Christopher John O'Brien, AM, of New South Wales. For continued service to medicine and to the community through advocacy and fundraising roles for the development of integrated care and clinical research facilities for people with cancer, particularly the establishment of the Lifehouse Centre at Royal Prince Alfred Hospital.
- Professor John Hemsley Pearn, AM RFD, of Queensland. For service to medicine, particularly in the areas of paediatrics and medical ethics, to medical history, and to the community through injury prevention and first aid programs.
- Mr Gregory John Poche, of New South Wales. For service to the community through philanthropic contributions to medical, aged care and sporting organisations, and to the freight transport industry through the introduction of innovative business practices.
- Mr Steven James Robinson. For service to Australia's international interests through a significant and sustained contribution.
- Professor John Lewis Warhurst, of The Australian Capital Territory. For service to higher education, particularly in the field of political science, as an academic, author and commentator on national and international political issues, and to the community.

=== Member (AM) ===
==== General Division ====
- Mr Tate Adams, of Queensland. For service to publishing and to the arts, particularly through contributions to the development of printmaking in Australia.
- The Honourable Ian Morton Armstrong, OBE, of New South Wales. For service to the Parliament of New South Wales, to the agricultural and livestock sectors, and to the community.
- Mrs Anita Aspinall, of South Australia. For service to local government and the community through environmental, aged care and historical organisations.
- Dr Peter Muecke Attiwill, of Victoria. For service to science, particularly in the field of forest ecology, as an academic, researcher and author.
- Dr Margaret Jessie Baikie, of Tasmania. For service to the community of Hobart through refugee resettlement programs, and to medicine.
- Emeritus Professor Lawrence Rae (Lawrie) Baker, of Victoria. For service to engineering as an educator, through the development of professional standards, and to the environment.
- Dr Margaret Caroline Batten, of Victoria. For service to education as a researcher and through a range of professional associations.
- Dr Jack Bendat, of Western Australia. For service to the community through philanthropic contributions to a range of charitable and cultural organisations.
- Mrs Lesley Rosemary Bowrey, of New South Wales. For service to tennis as a player, coach and mentor to junior players, and to the community.
- Mr Graham John Bradley, of New South Wales. For service to business, and to the community as a supporter of medical research and arts organisations.
- Mr Horace Peter Brand, of Queensland. For service to the pharmacy profession as a practitioner and through representative and educational roles.
- Mr William Morrison (Bill) Bristow, of Queensland. For service to rural and remote communities through the establishment of Angel Flight Australia and as a supporter of charitable organisations.
- Mr Michael Christodoulou, of New South Wales. For service to the Greek and Cypriot communities, particularly through the promotion of cultural diversity, reconciliation and harmony.
- Mr Garry Connelly, of Queensland. For service to motor sport through a range of executive roles.
- Dr Helen Margaret Creasey, of New South Wales. For service to medicine as a geriatrician and neurologist and through advisory roles with professional and community organisations.
- Mr Timothy Joseph Daly, of Victoria. For service to public administration, and to the community through roles with health care and emergency service organisations.
- Ms Felicity Margaret Dear, of Western Australia. For service to Indigenous education, particularly through the development of literacy and numeracy programs, and to the promotion of the Noongar culture.
- Professor Janet Elizabeth Delpratt, of Queensland. For service to the performing arts and to music education as a teacher of voice.
- The Honourable Geoffrey Michael Eames, QC, of Victoria. For service to the law and to the judiciary, particularly as an advocate for the advancement of Indigenous Australians in the legal profession.
- Ms Mary Lennie McCall, of Western Australia. For service to the preservation and promotion of history through state and national organisations, and to librarianship.
- Emeritus Professor Bruce Edgar Mansfield, of New South Wales. For service to education as an administrator and academic in the fields of theology and history.
- The Honourable Justice John Ronald Mansfield, QC, of South Australia. For service to the law and to the judiciary, to a range of professional associations, and to the arts community of South Australia.
- Dr Sandra Mary Mercer Moore, of Victoria. For service to physiotherapy through leadership roles with professional organisations, as a clinician, and to the Victorian Division of the Liberal Party of Australia.
- Ms Geertrude Maria (Trudy) Mills-Evers, of New South Wales. For service to the communities of Newcastle and the Hunter region through contributions to migrant health, education and research organisations.
- Associate Professor Manchala Mohan Rao, of South Australia. For service to medicine, particularly renal transplant surgery, as a mentor and educator and through professional development.
- Professor Balakrishnan R. (Kichu) Nair, of New South Wales. For service to medicine and to medical education through the development of undergraduate and professional development programs and as a geriatrician.
- The Reverend Father Augustin Duc Thu Nguyen, of Victoria. For service to the Vietnamese community of South Australia through cultural, social welfare and educational projects.
- Dr Michael Christoph O'Connor, of New South Wales. For service to medicine in the fields of obstetrics and gynaecology, particularly Indigenous maternal and perinatal health and through professional organisations.
- Adjunct Professor Alan Kenneth Pears, of Victoria. For service to the environment through the development of policy and design in the fields of energy efficiency and sustainability and through public awareness programs.
- Emeritus Professor Warren James Pengilley, RFD, of Victoria. For service to the law as a practitioner, regulator, academic and commentator in the areas of trade practices and franchising.
- Dr Joseph Frederick Pereira, of New South Wales. For service to the welfare of Burmese refugees and migrants, particularly through humanitarian aid and advocacy roles, and as a general practitioner.
- Dr Carole Bolton Pinnock, of South Australia. For service to medicine, particularly urological research, and to men's health through the development of support programs for people with prostate cancer.
- Associate Professor Lynne Pressley, of New South Wales. For service to medicine, particularly cardiology, as a clinician, teacher and mentor, and to the community through the Heart Foundation.
- Mr Kenneth Maxwell Randall, OAM, of The Australian Capital Territory. For continued service to journalism and public affairs through raising awareness of issues affecting the future of Australia and contributions to national debate.
- Professor John Alan Richards, of The Australian Capital Territory. For service to electrical engineering as an academic, through professional associations, and as a contributor to the development of space science.
- Emeritus Professor Calvin Wyatt Rose, of Queensland. For service to education in the areas of soil and water conservation, and to the promotion of environmental science.
- Dr David John Scrimgeour, of South Australia. For service to medicine through the development and delivery of services and programs in remote Indigenous communities, and to public health research.
- Mr Vincenzo Scurria, OAM, of Western Australia. For service to the Italian community of Western Australia through executive roles with welfare, cultural and business organisations.
- Mr Robert Stafford Sheldon, of New South Wales. For service to architecture as a practitioner and administrator, through contributions to a range of professional organisations, and to the community.
- Mr Lance Colbert Smith, of Queensland. For service to young people as a supporter and fundraiser for The Children's Hospital Westmead and Bear Cottage, and to the tourism industry.
- Dr Michael Steer, of New South Wales. For service to education through the Royal Institute for Deaf and Blind Children, and to the promotion of professional standards for vision support teachers in Pacific Island countries.
- Emeritus Professor David Michael Stokes, of Victoria. For service to tertiary science education as an administrator and researcher, to the establishment of partnerships with industry, and to the community of Geelong.
- Mr Allan Walter Teys, of Queensland. For service to the Australian meat industry, particularly the development of beef export markets and through professional organisations.
- Mrs Jennifer Thomas, of Australian Capital Territory. For service to the community through philanthropic support for higher education and medical research organisations, and to overseas humanitarian aid projects.
- Professor Napier Maurice Thomson, of Victoria. For service to medicine through research in the field of chronic renal disease, to medical education and through a range of professional associations.
- Mrs Elizabeth Anne Trevan, BEM, of New South Wales. For service to the community through contributions to children's health, to the development of cancer prevention and awareness programs, and to professional standards.
- Mrs Lois Agnes Turk, of New South Wales. For service to the community through philanthropic contributions to youth, social welfare and charitable organisations.
- Professor Martin John Tyas, of Victoria. For service to dentistry and dental education, to the Australian Dental Association and the Royal Australasian College of Dental Surgeons and through the development of industry standards.
- Mr James Noozhumurry Varghese, of Queensland. For service to public administration in Queensland through the development of policy reform and implementation, and to the community.
- Mrs Rose Marie Vojakovic, of Western Australia. For service to people with asbestos-related diseases through the establishment of advocacy and support services.
- Mrs Kaele Diane Way, of Victoria. For service to the community through the Australian Local Government Women's Association.
- Dr Jonathon Charles Welch, of Victoria. For service to the arts as an operatic performer and vocal coach, and to the community as the founder and musical director of the Choir of Hard Knocks.
- Emeritus Professor John Stuart Western, of Queensland. For service to education in the area of sociology as an academic, researcher and author.
- Professor Gerald Westheimer, Berkeley, California, USA. For service to vision science as a researcher, through optometric education and as a mentor.
- Dr Anthony Duckett White, RFD, of New South Wales. For service to dermatology through contributions to remote area practice, the management of skin disease in the Pacific Islands and education.
- Dr Mary Elizabeth White, of New South Wales. For service to botany as a researcher and through the promotion of increased understanding and awareness of the natural world.
- Professor James Stanislaus Williams, of Australian Capital Territory. For service to the physical sciences and engineering through education, research and administrative roles, particularly in the area of semiconductor physics.
- Mrs Janet Tindale Wilson, of Victoria. For service to greyhound racing through executive, marketing and promotional roles, to the development of animal welfare programs, and to the community.
- The Honourable Keith James Wilson, of Western Australia. For service to people with a mental illness and their carers through awareness and support programs.
- Dr Colin Walter Wrigley, of New South Wales. For service to primary industry, particularly to grain science as a researcher, and to the development of methods for improving wheat quality.
- Mr Alan Christopher Young, of South Australia. For service to the community, particularly through business advisory roles with health, medical research and educational organisations.
- Mr Alan Joseph Zammit, of New South Wales. For service to the community of north western Sydney through contributions to the region's infrastructure development and through a range of charitable organisations.
- Associate Professor John Bernard Ziegler, Department of Immunology and Infectious Diseases, Sydney Children's Hospital. For service to paediatric medicine in the areas of infectious disease, HIV/AIDS, and immunology and allergy as a practitioner, researcher and educator.

==== Military Division ====
===== Navy =====
- Warrant Officer Christopher Robert Garner, of Western Australia. For exceptional service as the Deputy Marine Engineering Officer HMAS Rankin, and with Sea Training Unit Submarines from December 2003 to October 2008.
- Commodore Raymond James Griggs, CSC, of Australian Capital Territory. For exceptional service to the Royal Australian Navy as the Amphibious Task Group Commander, Deputy Fleet Commander, Director General Navy Strategic Policy and Futures, and as Director General Force Structure Review for the Defence White Paper.

===== Army =====
- Brigadier David Colin Gillian, of Australian Capital Territory. For exceptional service to the Australian Army as the Director General Intelligence, and as the inaugural Commanding Officer, 1st Intelligence Battalion.
- Brigadier Peter Warwick Gilmore, DSC, of Australian Capital Territory. For exceptional service as Director General Public Affairs, and as Director General Future Land Warfare.

===== Air Force =====
- Air Commodore James Michael Brown, of New South Wales. For exceptional service as the Director of Plans in Air Command, as the Officer Commanding Number 92 Wing, and as the Director General of Operations in Joint Operations Command.
- Group Captain Andrew Phillip Doyle, CSM, of Australian Capital Territory. For exceptional service in management of the acquisition of the C-17 aircraft, as an acquisition management team member and as Project Director Air 8000 PH3-Heavy Airlift Project.

=== Medal (OAM) ===
==== General Division ====
- Ms Siti Mariam Abdullah Kawi, of Western Australia. For service to the Australian Federation of Islamic Councils, and to the community of Christmas Island.
- Mr Loch Neish Adams, of Victoria. For service to the community of Moorabbin.
- Associate Professor John William Agar, of Victoria. For service to renal medicine, and to the community of Geelong.
- Mr Stephen Roderick Ahern, of New South Wales. For service to radio broadcasting as an educator, media trainer and author.
- Mr Donald Charles Aldous, of Queensland. For service to local government, to the community of the Sunshine Coast, and to youth employment.
- Mr Benjamin Alexander, of Victoria. For service to the community, particularly through the North Eastern Jewish Centre.
- Mr Nelson Hayden Allen, of New South Wales. For service to the West Wallsend region through a range of sporting and community based organisations.
- Mr Robert Jeffrey Altamore, of Australian Capital Territory. For service to people with a vision impairment through advocacy roles with a range of organisations.
- Mr Lennie Anderson, of New South Wales. For service to the Indigenous community, particularly in the area of land rights for the Worimi people.
- Miss June Andrew, of South Australia. For service to nursing, and to the community of Marree.
- Mr Brian John Andrews, of New South Wales. For service to the community through the research and documentation of the heritage of the Hunter Valley region.
- Mrs June Mildred Andrews, of Queensland. For service to the Scouting movement, and to the community of the Wynnum Manly region.
- Ms Nina Angelo, of New South Wales. For service to the arts, and to the community of the Central Coast.
- Mr Ian Murray Angus, of New South Wales. For service to the community through a range of arts, cultural and civic organisations.
- Mr Ronald John Anning, of Western Australia. For service to the community of Peaceful Bay.
- Mrs Marjorie Joan Anslow, of New South Wales. For service to the community of Narrandera through social welfare and sporting organisations.
- Mr David John Ardrey, of Queensland. For service to veterans and their families, and to the community of the Beaudesert region.
- Mr Ralph Aston, of South Australia. For service to veterans and their families through the Royal Australian Air Force Association.
- Mrs Jane Edna Baker, of New South Wales. For service to people with disabilities, particularly through Down Syndrome NSW, and to the community of Yass.
- Mr David Robert Bamford, of New South Wales. For service to the community of Blacktown, and to Rotary International.
- Mr Darrell Maxwell Bampton, of New South Wales. For service to Rugby league football through a range of executive roles, as a player and as a mentor of young athletes.
- Mrs Isla Violet Baring, London, United Kingdom. For service to the arts as a supporter of young Australian musicians and performing artists.
- Major Ian Lyle Barnes, RFD ED, of Victoria. For service to veterans in the Geelong region.
- The Reverend Canon Dr John Gregory Barrett, of New South Wales. For service to the community of Port Macquarie through local government organisations, and to the Anglican Church of Australia.
- Dr Peter Thomas Bastable, of Queensland. For service to the development and delivery of emergency medicine in the Mackay region.
- Mr Frederick Allen Bayne, of Victoria. For service to the community through a range of health, local government and sporting organisations.
- Mrs Shirley Eileen Bean, of Victoria. For service to the community, particularly youth, through the Scouting movement.
- Mrs Nadia Beer, of Queensland. For service to the community through advocacy roles in the mental health sector.
- Mr Keith William Bell, of New South Wales. For service to the environment through the development of biological methods for treating organic waste.
- Mrs Melva Bergsma-Stone, of Western Australia. For service to the community through the Western Operations of the Royal Flying Doctor Service of Australia.
- Mr Sydney Abraham Berinson, of Western Australia. For service to the community, particularly through the Perth Hebrew Congregation.
- Mr Terence Neil Betts, of Queensland. For service to Rugby Union football as a player, administrator and coach.
- Mr Robert Alexander Bevan, of New South Wales. For service to the real estate industry through the promotion of professional standards, and to youth.
- Mr Bertram Reginald Beverley, of Victoria. For service to the community of the Goulburn Valley region.
- Dr Patrick Rodney Bird, of Victoria. For service to the environment through farm forestry and revegetation programs.
- Councillor Anthony Edward Bisdee, of Tasmania. For service to local government, and to the community of the Southern Midlands.
- Dr Graeme Leslie Blackman, of Victoria. For service to the pharmaceutical industry, and to the community through a range of church, heritage and welfare organisations.
- Mrs Denise Clare Blyth, of Queensland. For service to the community of Coomera through the Queensland Country Women's Association and Neighbourhood Watch.
- Captain Douglas Vivian Bourne-Jones, of South Australia. For service to transport and logistics, particularly through the shipping industry.
- Mr Neville Hilton Bracey, of New South Wales. For service to the community of Port Stephens.
- The Reverend Roy Algernon Bradley, of Victoria. For service to the community through the development of healthcare chaplaincy and pastoral education centres.
- Mr David Andrew Bradshaw, of Victoria. For service to the community as a fundraiser.
- Mrs Colleen Claire Brandstetter, of Australian Capital Territory. For service to the community of the Canberra region.
- Ms Margaret Florence Bresnahan, of New South Wales. For service to paediatric nursing, and to the community through a range of children's charities and overseas humanitarian aid programs.
- Mr George Herbert Brooks, of South Australia. For service to the community through the research and documentation of early South Australian motoring history.
- Mr Gordon Roy Brooks, of South Australia. For service to the sport of cycling in South Australia.
- Mr Leslie Alan Brown, of New South Wales. For service to road transport, and to the community of Kyogle.
- Mr Robert Ritchie Bruce, of New South Wales. For service to the community, particularly through the Rotary Charity Regatta.
- Mrs Doris Elma Budden, of New South Wales. For service to the community of Manilla.
- Mrs Edna May Burge, of New South Wales. For service to youth through the Guiding movement, and to the community of New Lambton.
- Mrs Lynette Marie Burgess, of New South Wales. For service to netball.
- Mr Peter Lynn Burns, of Tasmania. For service to the community, particularly through the preservation of the history of the St Helens area.
- Mrs Kathleen Byer, of Victoria. For service to the hospitality industry, and to the community through philanthropy.
- Mr Richard Galbraith Byres, of New South Wales. For service to Rugby Union football as a player, referee and administrator.
- Mr Scott McKenzie Byrnes, of Queensland. For service to surf lifesaving through a range of training and administrative roles.
- The Honourable Alan Glyndwr Cadman, of New South Wales. For service to the Parliament of Australia, and to the community of Mitchell.
- Ms Margaret Elaine Caldow, BEM, of Victoria. For service to netball as a coach, national selector and representative player.
- Mr Vincent Calleja, of Victoria. For service to the Maltese community of Victoria.
- Mrs Margaret Anne Callingham, of New South Wales. For service to the community through the McDonald's Performing Arts Challenge, and to the surf lifesaving movement.
- Miss Margaret Rosalie Callister, of Victoria. For service to youth through the Guiding movement, and to the community.
- Dr Lawrence Arthur Carroll, of Victoria. For service to medicine in the field of ophthalmology, particularly through the provision of surgery and training in developing countries.
- Mr Luigi Casagrande, of Queensland. For service to the Italian community, and to the development and management of transport infrastructure.
- Mr Manuel Bermejo (Manny) Castillo, of New South Wales. For service to the community, particularly through the Philippines-Australia Sports and Culture organisation.
- Mr Henry Chan, of New South Wales. For service to the community of Newcastle, particularly through support for migrants and refugees.
- Mr Darryl John Channells, of New South Wales. For service to the community of Blacktown, particularly through sport for children.
- Mrs Lydia Charlamow, of Victoria. For service to the Russian community of Victoria.
- Mrs Adele Francie Church, of Victoria. For service to the community of Yarrawonga, and to the Country Women's Association of Victoria.
- Mr Neville John Clark, of New South Wales. For service to people with disabilities and their families, and to the community of Port Macquarie.
- Mrs Barbara Ruth Clayman, of New South Wales. For service to the community through volunteer roles with Jewish organisations.
- Mr Kevin Howard Coate, of Western Australia. For service to the community, particularly the recording of the natural history of Western Australia, and to eco-tourism and conservation.
- Mrs Yvonne Elwyn Coate, of Western Australia. For service to the community, particularly the recording of the natural history of Western Australia, and to eco-tourism and conservation.
- The Venerable John Paul Collas, of South Australia. For service to the Anglican Church of Australia through leadership roles, and to the community.
- Mr Thomas Oliver Colless, of New South Wales. For service to the Blue Mountains region through a range of tourism, community and service organisations.
- Mr Stanley Bruce Collins, of Queensland. For service to local government, and to the community of the Winton district.
- Mr John Dominic Condon, of South Australia. For service to the community through Australian Rules football and the Carbine Club of South Australia.
- Mrs Ruth Leonie Condon, of New South Wales. For service to the community, particularly through Torchbearers for Legacy.
- Mr Stanley Coomber, of Queensland. For service to lawn bowls as a player, coach, selector and administrator.
- Mr Maurice George Cooper, of New South Wales. For service to the community of the Blue Mountains, and as a fundraiser for a range of charitable organisations.
- Mr Russell Richard Cooper, of New South Wales. For service to the community of East Maitland.
- Ms Maureen Lesley Corrigan, of Victoria. For service to the City of Whittlesea through the development of support groups and community facilities.
- Mr Mark Stephen Cranfield, of Australian Capital Territory. For service to Australian folklore and to the recording of oral histories.
- Mrs Pamela Lynette Crosthwaite, of Victoria. For service to nursing, and to the community of Yackandandah.
- Mr Robert Charles Crosthwaite, of New South Wales. For service to the welfare of veterans and their families, particularly in the area of aged care.
- Mr Grahame Hugh Cumming, of New South Wales. For service to the community through the documentation of the history of the Freemasonry movement.
- Mr John Kenneth Cummins, of New South Wales. For service to motor racing, particularly historic cars.
- Mr James Cyngler, of Victoria. For service to the community in the area of Jewish education.
- Mr John Charles Dalby, of New South Wales. For service to the community through St John Ambulance Australia.
- Ms Teresa Luisa Dall'Acqua Leonardi, of South Australia. For service to the Italian community of South Australia through a range of cultural and social welfare organisations.
- Mr Mario Damo, of Australian Capital Territory. For service to the multicultural community of the Australian Capital Territory.
- The Reverend Cyril Dann, of Tasmania. For service to the community of Hobart through the provision of chaplaincy and pastoral care services.
- Mrs Bettye Lloyd Dare, of Queensland. For service to the community as an organist with the Burleigh Heads Uniting Church.
- Mrs Beatrice Mary Davies, of New South Wales. For service to the communities of Wilcannia and Broken Hill, and to the Royal Flying Doctor Service of Australia.
- Mr Christopher Warren Deacon, of Australian Capital Territory. For service to community radio through the ArtSound organisation.
- Mr Adrianus Gerardus (Jos) Deklijn, of Victoria. For service to dentistry, and to the community.
- The Honourable John Edward Delzoppo, of Victoria. For service to the Parliament of Victoria, to local government, and to the community of Neerim.
- Ms Piroozi Desai-Keane, of New South Wales. For service to music through the Sydney Eisteddfod.
- Mr Vaso Despotovic, of New South Wales. For service to the Serbian community in Australia.
- Mr Douglas William Diggs, of New South Wales. For service to the community of Gilgandra through Lions Australia.
- Mrs Joan Dianne Dillon, of Victoria. For service to youth through the Scouting movement.
- Mr William Frank Dimmick, of Victoria. For service to veterans through the Royal Australian Air Force Europe Association.
- Wing Commander William Edmund Dixon (Ret'd), of Tasmania. For service to veterans through the Royal Australian Air Force Association Tasmania Division.
- Mrs Thelma Rae Dowell, of Victoria. For service to people with disabilities through the Onemda Association.
- Mr Ernest John Dowler, of South Australia. For service to the community of Adelaide through the pipe band movement.
- Mr Anthony Thomas Doyle, of New South Wales. For service to veterans through the Returned and Services League of Australia, and to the community of Mungindi.
- Mr Barry John Doyle, of New South Wales. For service to the community of Cowra through support for sporting events and organisations.
- Sister Joan Maree Doyle, Lima, Peru. For service to the international community through the development and establishment of facilities for disadvantaged families in Cerro Candela, Lima, Peru.
- Mr Peter Norwood Doyle, of New South Wales. For service to the communities of the lower Hunter region through youth, local government and health organisations.
- Mrs Mary Drost, of Victoria. For service to Victoria, in particular the community of Boroondara.
- Mr Harry Geoffrey Drury, of South Australia. For service to the communities of the Adelaide Hills and Torrens Valley regions.
- Mrs Janis Christine Duffy, of New South Wales. For service to the community of Baulkham Hills through aged care, service and sporting organisations.
- Ms Suzi Janet Duncan, of Victoria. For service to people with a disability, particularly through the Wheelies with Wings program, and to the community.
- Mr Bashir Ahmed Ebrahim, of Queensland. For service to people with a vision impairment through advocacy roles.
- Mr Russell Charles Eccleston, of South Australia. For service to the community of South Australia through Meals on Wheels and a range of church and aged care organisations.
- Mr Frederick Alfred Edwards, of New South Wales. For service to the community through voluntary roles with Rotary International, and to the community of Tamworth.
- Mr Hugh Edwards, of Western Australia. For service to Australia's maritime heritage through the discovery of historic shipwrecks, and as an author.
- Mrs Ira Effrett, of Victoria. For service to the community through disability services, and to the Epilepsy Foundation of Victoria.
- Mrs Dora Eisenberg, of New South Wales. For service to the community of Sydney as a volunteer.
- Mr Alan Garth Ellery, of South Australia. For service to youth through the Scouting movement, and to the community of Port Pirie.
- Mrs Libby Ellis, of South Australia. For service to the arts, particularly opera.
- Mr Thomas Reginald Ellis, of New South Wales. For service to the community of Taree through charitable, agricultural and service organisations.
- Mr David Leslie Fahey, of New South Wales. For service to the arts through Opera in the Bush, and to the community of Morundah.
- Miss Beverley Farley, of Queensland. For service to education, and to the community.
- Mrs Shirley Elizabeth Farrow, of Victoria. For service to youth through the Guiding and Scouting movements, and to the community.
- Mrs Roslyn (Roz) Feitelson, deceased, of New South Wales. For service to the community as a fundraiser for Jewish organisations.
- Mrs Ellen Fels, of Queensland. For service to the community of Julia Creek.
- Mrs Pamela Eleanor Fisher, of New South Wales. For service to the community through the Compassionate Friends of New South Wales organisation.
- Mr John Buchanan Fitzgerald, of South Australia. For service to the community through the surf lifesaving movement.
- Mr Raymond John Fitzgerald, of Western Australia. For service to the community through aged accommodation and care facilities and programs.
- Mrs Deborah May Fleming, of Victoria. For service to the community of the Macedon Ranges, and to the Guiding movement.
- Adjunct Associate Professor Lesley Christine Fleming, of Queensland. For service to nursing through administrative and educational roles.
- Mr Alan John Ford, of New South Wales. For service to the community of the Central Coast, and to local government.
- Mr Peter Aidan France, of Tasmania. For service to the dairy industry through the Tasmanian Farmers and Graziers Association, and to the community.
- Dr Ian Caithness Francis, of New South Wales. For service to medicine as an ophthalmologist.
- Mr Paul Ivan Francis, of New South Wales. For service to the community through fundraising for the Humpty Dumpty Foundation.
- Mrs Felicity Jane Fraser, of Victoria. For service to international relations through the GOYA Foundation.
- Mr Maxwell Gerard Frost, deceased, of Tasmania. For service to the community of the Meander Valley area as curator and historian for the Westbury Historical Society.
- Mr Derek Francis Gatley, of Western Australia. For service to the sport of ballroom dancing.
- Mr Harry Gelber, of Victoria. For service to the community through the establishment of mental health programs supporting children and the Indigenous community.
- Mrs Robyn Ann Gerber, of New South Wales. For service to the Jewish community, and to the international community through Oxfam Australia.
- Mrs Lucy Kathleen Germon, of New South Wales. For service to the community of Gloucester.
- The Reverend Dr Graeme Dalence Gibbons, of Victoria. For service to the community through chaplaincy and the development of pastoral care education, particularly at the Austin Hospital.
- Mr Raymond George Gill, ESM, of New South Wales. For service to the community through the New South Wales Volunteer Rescue Association.
- Ms Julia Virginia Gillespie, of Australian Capital Territory. For service to the community through the St Ninian's Uniting Church Friendship Group.
- Mr Jozef Glapa, of South Australia. For service to the Polish community of South Australia.
- Mrs Carolyn Frances Goldsmith, of Queensland. For service to the community, particularly through the National Council of Jewish Women of Australia.
- Mr Alan John Grasset, of New South Wales. For service to vocational education and training, particularly in the plumbing industry.
- Mr Stanley Gordon Gratte, of Western Australia. For service to the community, particularly through the Geraldton Historical Society.
- Mr Clifford Green, of Victoria. For service to the Australian film and television industry as a screenwriter and educator.
- Mrs Fay Mary Green, of New South Wales. For service to education, and to the Indigenous community of Walgett.
- Mr John Edward Green, of New South Wales. For service to local government, and to the community of Tamworth.
- Mr Gordon Nigel Gregory, of Australian Capital Territory. For service to the community through the National Rural Health Alliance.
- Mr Patrick Langley Griffin, of New South Wales. For service to the tourism and hospitality industries, particularly through the Australian Hotels Association.
- Mrs Melvena Patricia Hallam, of Queensland. For service to ex-service personnel and their families through the Veteran's Support and Advocacy Service.
- Mr Russell Halpern, of Western Australia. For service to the community through aged care facilities and programs.
- Mr Philip John Handel, of New South Wales. For service to the visual arts using the medium of stained glass, and to the community.
- Dr Gorur Krishna (Harry) Harinath, of New South Wales. For service to cricket through executive roles at state and national level, and to the community.
- Mr Clifford Edward Harris, of New South Wales. For service to swimming, particularly through Swimming New South Wales.
- Mr Joseph Christopher (Joe) Hasham, Kuala Lumpur, Malaysia. For service to performing arts through The Actors Studio, Malaysia, and as an actor, writer, producer and director.
- Mr Reuben Leonard Hawkins, deceased, of New South Wales. For service to the community through the provision of support for a range of research, charitable and social welfare organisations.
- Mr Alan Bruce Hayes, of New South Wales. For service to the Central Coast region, and to the environment as an author and publisher.
- Mr Arthur Booker Haynes-Lovell, of Queensland. For service to Rugby League football as an administrator, and to the community of Wynnum Manly.
- Mr George Hicks, of New South Wales. For service to local government, and to the community of the Nambucca Shire.
- Mr Douglas John Higgins, of Victoria. For service to veterans and their families through the Sebastopol Sub-Branch of the Returned and Services League of Australia.
- Alderman Maurice Walton Hill, of Tasmania. For service to Rotary International, to local government, and to the community of Devonport.
- Major Constance Joan (Connie) Hindle, of New South Wales. For service to the community in the area of social welfare, and to The Salvation Army.
- Major Stanley James (Stan) Hindle, of New South Wales. For service to the community in the area of social welfare, and to The Salvation Army.
- Ms Dianne Hirsh, of Victoria. For service to the community through contributions to inter-faith dialogue, and to the National Council of Jewish Women Australia.
- Mrs Beryl Mary Horwood, of Australian Capital Territory. For service to migrant and refugee women in the Australian Capital Territory.
- Mr Noel Alvin Howard, of Tasmania. For service to the community of Risdon Vale, particularly through Neighbourhood Watch.
- Dr John Stephen Howe, of Australian Capital Territory. For service to medicine as a general practitioner.
- Mr John Michael Howson, of Victoria. For service to the entertainment industry as a writer and performer.
- Mr Edward James Hughes, of South Australia. For service to the environment and national parks.
- Mrs Margaret Rhoda Hughes, of Victoria. For service to the community as a music teacher and choir director.
- Mrs Christine Gloria Hunter, of Australian Capital Territory. For service to public education, and to the community.
- Mr Douglas James Hunter, RFD, of New South Wales. For service to military history, particularly through the 8th/13th Victorian Mounted Rifles Museum, and to the community of Albury.
- Mr Mirko Husnjak, of South Australia. For service as a craftsman through carpentry projects of historical significance.
- Mr Francis Edward (Frank) Ifield, of New South Wales. For service to the arts as an entertainer.
- Mr Neil James Inall, of New South Wales. For service to farming and the rural sector, particularly in the field of communication.
- Mr John Alexander Ireland, of New South Wales. For service to the community through the Catholic Club, Sydney.
- Mrs Cherry Jackaman, of New South Wales. For service to heritage conservation through the National Trust of Australia (New South Wales).
- Mr Russell Richard James, of Victoria. For service to the community of Eildon.
- Mr Paul Jenes, of Victoria. For service to athletics as a statistician, competition official, commentator and sports historian.
- Captain Henry Robert Jenkin (Ret'd), of Western Australia. For service to music in the Perth region through a range of community bands.
- Mr Leith Colwill Jenkins, of South Australia. For service to the rural community of Riverton, and to the Royal Agricultural and Horticultural Society of South Australia.
- Mr Peter Stewart Jenkins, of Western Australia. For service to the community of Morawa though local government, sporting and agriculture groups.
- Ms Ronda Margaret Jenkins, of Victoria. For service to athletics, particularly as a records officer, and to the community.
- Mrs Anna Jiranek, of South Australia. For service to the Czechoslovak Club in South Australia.
- Mr Zdenek Josef Jiranek, of South Australia. For service to the Czechoslovak Club in South Australia.
- Emeritus Professor Bruce Johnson, of Tasmania. For service to the Australia China Friendship Society, Tasmania, and to the arts.
- Mr Antony David Jones, of Western Australia. For service to the visual arts as a sculptor and educator.
- Mr Douglas William Jones, of New South Wales. For service to the painting and decorating industry through education and training roles, and to the community.
- Mr Geoffrey Trevor Jones, of New South Wales. For service to the community through the Sydney Eisteddfod.
- Mr Robin Bethune Jones, of Victoria. For service to the community through voluntary roles, particularly with Caulfield Grammar School.
- Mr Howard James Judd, of Victoria. For service to the communities of Yarrawonga and Mulwala.
- Councillor Nigel Ashley Judd, of New South Wales. For service to local government, and to the communities of Ariah Park and Temora.
- Ms Kay Marie Kavanagh, of New South Wales. For service to the aged care industry.
- Mr Gerald Austin Kay, of Tasmania. For service to the community of north west Tasmania as a fundraiser.
- Ms Patricia Anne Keating, of New South Wales. For service to the Indigenous communities of the Newcastle region, and to environmental and historical organisations.
- Mrs Doreen Merle Keding, of Western Australia. For service to the community through church and service organisations.
- Mr Ronald Charles Keys, of New South Wales. For service to athletics, particularly through administrative roles.
- The Reverend Peter Brian Kilkeary, of New South Wales. For service to the community, and to the Strathfield-Homebush Baptist Church.
- Mr John Beresford King, of Victoria. For service to architecture as a practitioner, and to the community through Vasey RSL Care.
- Mr John George King, of Victoria. For service to the community, and to people with disabilities through philanthropy.
- Mr John Russell King, of New South Wales. For service to the fire and emergency services, and to the community of Penrith.
- Associate Professor James Leslie (Jim) Kohen, of New South Wales. For service to the Indigenous community, particularly the preservation of the heritage and culture of the Darug people.
- Mr Lloyd Eric Larney, of Queensland. For service to the community of Maleny.
- Dr Siobhan Kathleen Lavelle, of New South Wales. For service to historical archaeology and heritage conservation, particularly the preservation of colonial roads and cemeteries.
- Sister Judith Bernadette Lawson, of New South Wales. For service to education as Principal of Santa Sabina College and through professional organisations.
- Mr Thomas Charles Lee, of New South Wales. For service to the community of Narrandera through sporting, social welfare and ex-service organisations.
- Mr Matthew Joseph Leighton, of New South Wales. For service to the communities of the Narellan and Camden areas.
- The Reverend Clive Drew Lelean, of Victoria. For service to the community of Victoria through the development of chaplaincy and pastoral care education in the field of mental health.
- Mr Kenneth George Leonard, of Queensland. For service to the community through the Redcliffe Kippa-Ring Lions Club.
- Mr Ian Craig Leslie, of New South Wales. For service to the media, particularly current affairs journalism, and to the community.
- Mr Monty Leventhal, of New South Wales. For service to science through volunteer roles at the Sydney Observatory.
- Mrs Judith Marie Lewis, of New South Wales. For service to the community through educational roles, and to the Riverstone and District Historical Society.
- Mr Raymond Vivian Lewis, of Victoria. For service to the community, particularly to the welfare of senior citizens.
- Mr William Alec Lewis, of New South Wales. For service to the community of Port Hacking.
- Mr William Robert Liddiard, of New South Wales. For service to community safety and horticultural organisations in the Maclean and Grafton areas.
- Mr William John Little, of New South Wales. For service to the community through the Rotary Charity Regatta.
- Mr Ian Robert Lobsey, of New South Wales. For service to local government, to education, and to the communities of Werris Creek and Nundle.
- Mr Robert Alister Lockhart, of New South Wales. For service to local government, and to the community of Forbes.
- Mr John William Lofthouse, of Queensland. For service to the welfare of veterans and their families.
- Mr Jeremy Phillip Long, of New South Wales. For service to the Indigenous community, to the public sector, and to humanitarian groups.
- Mr Maurice George Lowe, of Tasmania. For service to veterans and their families in Launceston.
- Mr Paul Bryan Lynch, of Victoria. For service to the hospitality and catering industry, and to the community.
- Mr Cecil John McArthur, deceased, of Victoria. For service to the community of the Western District through a range of service, sporting and health organisations.
- Ms Anne Catherine McCormick, of New South Wales. For service to business as an antiquarian bookseller, and to Australia's cultural heritage as a collector.
- Dr Alison McCusker, of Australian Capital Territory. For service to science through the cataloguing of Australian flora.
- Sister Patricia Anne McDermott, Lima, Peru. For service to the international community through the development and establishment of facilities for disadvantaged families in Cerro Candela, Lima, Peru.
- Mrs Della May McGraw, of Victoria. For service to the community of Cohuna through a range of tourism, local government and youth organisations.
- Mr Ian Martin McHutchison, of Victoria. For service to the community through executive roles.
- Dr Ian Donald McInnes, of South Australia. For service to golf, and to the community of Loxton.
- Mrs Sheila Mary McKay, of Victoria. For service to the community of the Yarra Valley region.
- Dr William Duirs McKellar, of Victoria. For service to medicine as a paediatrician, and to the community of Barwon.
- Mr Gordon James McKern, of Victoria. For service to the community of regional of Victoria through a range of water industry, education and cultural organisations.
- Mrs Gladys May McLean, of Australian Capital Territory. For service to the community through the Drugs in the Family support group.
- Mrs Anne Louise McLeish, of Victoria. For service to the community through Grandparents Australia.
- Mr Holt Frederick McMinn, of Queensland. For service to Vietnam veterans and their families.
- Ms June Audrey McNicol, of Queensland. For service to the craft of bookbinding, and to Yeronga Meals on Wheels.
- Ms Helen Mary McPhee, of South Australia. For service to the community through Catholic education organisations.
- Dr Peter Trembath McTigue, of Victoria. For service to education through the advancement of the study of chemistry.
- Ms Margaret Helen Mabbitt, of Victoria. For service to nursing as a midwife, and to the Royal Women's Hospital.
- Mr Donald William Macinnis, of New South Wales. For service to the community of Taree, and to the radiography profession.
- Dr Warwick Jason Mackay, of New South Wales. For service to medicine as a general practitioner, and to the community.
- Mr William Duncan Mackenzie, of South Australia. For service to the environment through Birds Australia Gluepot Reserve, and to the community.
- Mrs Patricia Maggs, of Victoria. For service to people with dementia and their carers.
- The Reverend Father Brian Thomas Maher, of Australian Capital Territory. For service to the Canberra region through historical organisations, and to the Catholic Church of Australia.
- Mr Garry Leigh Mallard, of New South Wales. For service to the community through Shelter New South Wales and the National Tenant Support Network.
- Mr Michael Norman Mann, of Tasmania. For service to the youth of Tasmania through the Australian Naval Cadets.
- Mrs Ruth Ellenor Marchant James, of Western Australia. For service to the community through the documentation of the history of Western Australia.
- Mr Benjamin Richard Marris, of Tasmania. For service to the community through health, charitable and palliative care organisations.
- Mr Alfred George Marshall, of Western Australia. For service to the community of Pingelly, particularly through the agricultural show.
- Mrs Valda Elaine Martin, of Victoria. For service to the crafts of handspinning, weaving, embroidery and patchwork.
- Mr Joseph William Mason, of Western Australia. For service to the community through Lions International.
- Mrs Elizabeth Masterman, of New South Wales. For service to the community of Kurri Kurri.
- Mrs Lynette Ruth Mayne, of South Australia. For service to the community of Onkaparinga.
- Mrs Kathleen Faye Mazzella, of Western Australia. For service to the community through raising awareness of gynaecological health issues.
- Mrs Susan Maree Medson, of Victoria. For service to the community through leadership roles in the child, youth and family services sector.
- Mr John Vincent Meehan, of New South Wales. For service to surf lifesaving, and to the community.
- Mr Keith Raymond Meggs, DFM, of Victoria. For service to the community through the research and documentation of Australian Aviation history.
- Mrs Valma May Melville, of New South Wales. For service to the community of Kempsey.
- Mrs June Isabel Mickleburgh, of Australian Capital Territory. For service to migrant and refugee women, and to the Australian Capital Territory Embroiderers' Guild.
- Mr Malcolm Bruce Middleton, of Queensland. For service to architecture, and to the community through child welfare organisations.
- Mr John Robert Milhinch, of New South Wales. For service to the community through the Royal Flying Doctor Service of Australia.
- Mr Alexander Dexter Milledge, of Victoria. For service to the motorcycle industry, and to the sport of sailing.
- Mr Douglas Robert Minty, of New South Wales. For service to the community through the Watch and Clockmakers Societies of Australia.
- Mrs Margaret Anne Molloy, of New South Wales. For service to the community of West Pittwater.
- Mrs Denise Margaret Molony, of Australian Capital Territory. For service to the Indo Chinese, Albanian and Afghan communities in the Canberra region.
- Mr Kenneth Earnest Monson, of Tasmania. For service to the community of Ulverstone.
- Mrs Rhonda Moore, of New South Wales. For service to the community of the Shoalhaven region, and through contributions to rural communities in Kenya.
- Mrs Eugenia Moraitis, of Victoria. For service to the Greek community and multicultural radio as a presenter and producer.
- Mr Bruce Charles Morison, of New South Wales. For service to canoeing as an administrator, coach and mentor, and to the community.
- Mrs Helen Morris, of Victoria. For service to education through teaching and curriculum development roles with a range of Jewish schools.
- Mrs Erin Anne Mountstephens, of New South Wales. For service to charitable organisations, particularly through fundraising for Vision Australia.
- Mr Dennis Peter Mudd, of New South Wales. For service to education, and to the community.
- Mrs Judith Rae Murdoch, of South Australia. For service to historical organisations in South Australia, particularly in the Naracoorte region.
- Mr Rocco (Roy) Mustaca, of New South Wales. For service to the community of Pittwater through support for health, service and multicultural organisations.
- Mr John Nader, of New South Wales. For service to the community of Moruya.
- Mr Patrick Michael (Pasquale) Nati, of New South Wales. For service to the community through the support of charitable organisations, particularly Special Olympics Australia.
- Mr Colin Walter Nelson, of South Australia. For service to Australian Rules football through junior player development and the Goodwood Saints Football Club.
- Mr Andrew Clark Newell, of New South Wales. For service to athletics, and to the community of the Central Coast.
- Professor Alan B. P. Ng, deceased, of New South Wales. For service to medicine, particularly in the field of pathology.
- Dr Valentine Gabriel (Val) Noone, of Victoria. For service to education as an academic and historical researcher, and to the community.
- Envoy Donald James Nottage, of Queensland. For service to the community through The Salvation Army and ex-service groups.
- Mrs Mary Catherine (Molly) Nuttall, of Western Australia. For service to people with cancer and their families in Western Australia.
- Mr Graham Charles Nybo, of South Australia. For service to veterans and their families through the South Australian Branch of the Returned and Services League of Australia, and to youth.
- Mrs Betty Jean O'Callaghan, of Western Australia. For service to the community of Coorow.
- Mrs Beverley Anne Orr, of Australian Capital Territory. For service to the community, particularly children through foster care and child protection.
- Mr Graeme Murray Owens, of Western Australia. For service to the sport of sailing.
- Mr John Samuel Owens, of Victoria. For service to the community of the Bass Coast Shire through health and service organisations.
- Mr Graeme Leslie Paine, of Tasmania. For service to the performing arts through a range of live theatre organisations, and to the community of Hobart.
- Mrs Marion Fyfe Palmer, of New South Wales. For service to the community, particularly through the Country Women's Association and the Uniting Church in Australia.
- Dr Giuseppe Guido Panizza, of Western Australia. For service to the Italian community of Perth.
- Mr Norman Donald Paterson, of South Australia. For service to the community, and to the road transport and fertiliser industries.
- The Reverend David George Peake, of Victoria. For service to young people in the Broadmeadows region, and to the Anglican Church of Australia.
- Mr Kenneth George Peake, of Victoria. For service to the community of Gippsland through the establishment of Gippsland Rotary Centenary House.
- Mrs Marjory Evelyn Pearce, of Queensland. For service to veterans through the Ex-Service Women's Association of Queensland.
- Mr Rodney Taunton Pearse, of New South Wales. For service to youth, particularly through the Juvenile Diabetes Research Foundation and Outward Bound Australia.
- Associate Professor Bruce John Pennay, of New South Wales. For service to the community of the Albury Wodonga region, particularly through the establishment of the Bonegilla Migrant Reception Centre Heritage Park.
- Mr Joseph Patrick Peoples, of New South Wales. For service to veterans and their families through the Kingscliff Sub-Branch of the Returned and Services League of Australia.
- Associate Professor Christopher Francis Perry, of Queensland. For service to medicine as an ear, nose and throat specialist, and to Indigenous health.
- Brigadier Douglas Ivan Perry, RFD ED, (Ret'd), of Victoria. For service to the community of the Mornington Peninsula.
- Mr Trevor William Pescott, of Victoria. For service to conservation and the environment, and to the community of Geelong.
- Mrs Topsy Dianne Petchey, of Victoria. For service to local government, and to the community of the Kingston region.
- Mr Richard James Petrie, of New South Wales. For service to community health through the Williams Syndrome Association of Australia and the Association of Genetic Support of Australasia.
- Mr Ronald Wilson Pilkington, of Queensland. For service to the Presbyterian Church of Queensland.
- Mr Kenneth James Pollard, of Victoria. For service to the community through the Torquay Surf Life Saving Club.
- Mrs Margaret Jane Pontifex, of New South Wales. For service to conservation and the environment, particularly through the Mangrove Mountain and Districts Community Group, and to the community.
- Mr Leslie William Pontin, of Queensland. For service to the community of Caloundra.
- Mr Peter Sean Price, of New South Wales. For service to community safety through executive roles with the Crime Stoppers organisation.
- Mr Brian William Rawlins, of Victoria. For service to health through Heart Support Australia, and to the community of the Gippsland region.
- Mr Alan Francis Reece, of Queensland. For service to the welfare of ex-service personnel and their families.
- Associate Professor Peter Coulthard Reed, of New South Wales. For service to medicine through education and training, and to the community of Port Macquarie.
- Mrs Joan Reese, deceased, of New South Wales. For service to the study of early Australian history and genealogy through research and indexing.
- Mrs Josephine Dawn Reeves, of South Australia. For service to dental health as an hygienist and through education programs for migrant families.
- Mrs Martina Reisgys, of New South Wales. For service to the Lithuanian community of Sydney.
- Mr Keith Leonard Rhind, of New South Wales. For service to Rugby League football through administrative roles in the Penrith district.
- Mrs Audrey Margaret Rhodes, of New South Wales. For service to the community of the Shellharbour district.
- Mr Thomas Barlow Rhodes, of New South Wales. For service to the community of the Shellharbour district.
- Associate Professor David Alexander Richards, of New South Wales. For service to medicine in the field of cardiology, and to the community through the Sydney City to Surf fun run.
- Mrs Helen Dawn Richards, of South Australia. For service to the community of Kangaroo Island, particularly through the conservation of natural resources and the Landcare movement.
- Mr Keith Ernest Richards, of New South Wales. For service to children and young people in the Sunraysia region.
- Mr Ronald Frank Richter, of New South Wales. For service to athletics, particularly in a range of voluntary roles.
- Mrs Cheryl Roach, of New South Wales. For service to highland dancing as a teacher, and to the establishment of OzScot Australia.
- Mrs Norma Roach, of New South Wales. For service to the arts through the development of cultural activities and facilities in the Queanbeyan region.
- Mr Richard George Roberts, of Western Australia. For service to surf lifesaving, to Rugby Union football, and to the community of Western Australia.
- Dr John Douglas Robinson, of New South Wales. For service to medicine as a general practitioner, and to the community through the Sydney City to Surf fun run.
- Mrs Teresa Rocchi, of Western Australia. For service to the community of Fremantle, and to the development and promotion of tourism in the Peel region.
- Mr Aubrey Elwyn Rogers, deceased, of Queensland. For service to veterans, and to the community of Mackay.
- Dr Warren McIntosh Rogers, RFD AE, of South Australia. For service to the community through church and educational organisations.
- Mrs Marian Rosa Rollings, of Victoria. For service to the community of Springvale.
- Mrs Nancy Joan Rooke, of New South Wales. For service to the Indigenous community of the Albury Wodonga region. Elder of the Wiradjuri.
- Dr Ian Albert Roos, of Victoria. For service to the community through raising awareness of men's health issues.
- Dr Laila Leah Rotstein, of Victoria. For service to medicine as a clinician, educator and mentor.
- Mr Bruce Alexander Ruston, of New South Wales. For service to the community, particularly through Rotary International, and to the sign writing industry.
- Mr Thomas Joseph Ryan, of Queensland. For service to the community through the preservation of the history of the 2/14 Light Horse Regiment.
- Mr Graham Hartley Ryles, of Victoria. For service to the visual arts.
- Mrs Janet Maria (Jenny) Sanders, of New South Wales. For service to the Indigenous community of the Hornsby area.
- Mrs Dorothea Joan Sawatzki, of New South Wales. For service to the community of the Richmond Valley.
- Dr Peter Schiff, of Victoria. For service to health in the field of haematology, and to the Jewish community.
- Mr Lawrence John Schmitt, of South Australia. For service to motor sport as an official.
- Dr Richard Schodde, of Australian Capital Territory. For service to science, particularly in the field of ornithology.
- Mrs Heather Margaret Schubert, of South Australia. For service to critical care nursing as a practitioner and educator.
- Mr Edward Royston Scull, of Western Australia. For service to biomedical engineering and associated professional associations.
- Mr Brian Edward Semmler, of New South Wales. For service to the community of the Dubbo region.
- Dr Nona Mary Seward, of Victoria. For service to the community, particularly through the University College.
- Dr Leslie Edward Sharp, of New South Wales. For service to gymnastics in the Canberra region as a coach and administrator.
- Mr Lionel Simon Sharpe, of Victoria. For service to the community, particularly through social welfare and Jewish organisations.
- Mrs Beverley Joan Shay, of Queensland. For service to the community through the research and documentation of the history of the Cooktown district.
- Mr John Bernard Shay, of Queensland. For service to the community through the research and documentation of the history of the Cooktown district.
- Mrs Lois Mary Shinners, of Queensland. For service to the community through voluntary roles.
- Mr Wolodymyr Shumsky, of New South Wales. For service to the Ukrainian community through cultural, educational and literary contributions.
- Mrs Barbara Helen Silinis, of Australian Capital Territory. For service to the Lithuanian community of Canberra.
- Mrs Lurline Dorothy Simpson, of New South Wales. For service to the community of southern Sydney through a range of church, health and disability organisations.
- Mr Barry Earnest Skinner, of South Australia. For service to the sport of cycling as an administrator and coach.
- Mrs Anne Maree Smith, of New South Wales. For service to youth through the Guiding movement.
- Mrs Elaine Hazel Smith, of Victoria. For service to the community through philanthropic contributions to charities.
- Mrs Kathleen Meryle Smith, of New South Wales. For service to the community of Grenfell.
- Mr John Malcolm Stacy, of Western Australia. For service to local government, and to the community of Coorow.
- Dr John Standley, of Queensland. For service to agricultural science in the areas of soil and plant research, and to the community.
- Mr Kenneth Steele, of Western Australia. For service to the community as an advocate for carers of relatives with a mental illness.
- Dr Peter Michael Stevens, of Victoria. For service to rural medicine as a general practitioner and educator.
- Mr Richard Albert Stewart, of New South Wales. For service to the community through surf lifesaving and church organisations.
- Mr Jonathan Howard Summers, Edinburgh, UK. For service to the performing arts as a baritone.
- Dr Micheil Francis Sweet, of Tasmania. For service to medicine as a general practitioner, and to the community of the Derwent Valley.
- Mr Marten Adlington Syme, of Victoria. For service to the community and heritage conservation in the Port Fairy region.
- Mr Donald Montague Tait, of New South Wales. For service to veterans, and to the preservation of artillery history and heritage.
- Mr John Robert Tate, of New South Wales. For service to veterans and their families, and to the community of Nelson Bay.
- Mrs Margaret (Meg) Taylor, of Tasmania. For service to the development of art libraries in Australia.
- Mrs Janice Claire Thomas, of New South Wales. For service to the community, particularly through the 2/3 AHS Centaur Association.
- Mrs Jennifer Robin Thomas, of New South Wales. For service to the community of North Sydney, particularly through charitable and service groups.
- Mr John Stewart Thompson, of New South Wales. For service to the community through the Australian Light Horse Regiment 'A' Troop.
- Mrs Jean Marjorie Thomson, of Australian Capital Territory. For service to the community through women's organisations, and to the Uniting Church in Australia.
- Mr Gary Phillip Thorpe, of Queensland. For service to music, and to community radio.
- Mr Matthew Palmer Tiddy, of South Australia. For service to people with disabilities and their families, and to the community.
- Dr Trevor James Tierney, of New South Wales. For service to medicine as a general practitioner, and to the community of Bonalbo.
- Mrs Elaine Dawn Traeger, of South Australia. For service to the community, particularly through Meals on Wheels in South Australia.
- Mrs Caroline Lindsey Travers, of Victoria. For service to women through the International Association of Lyceum Clubs, and to the community.
- Mrs Gwenith (Pym) Trueman, of Tasmania. For service to the community through a range of peace, inter-faith and human rights organisations.
- Mr Michael Tsolakis, of Western Australia. For service to the Greek community of Western Australia through a range of multicultural, church and sporting organisations.
- Mr David Roberts Turnbull, of Queensland. For service to the welfare of veterans and their families, particularly in northern Queensland.
- Mr Jonas Walter van Praag, of Tasmania. For service to community health through raising the awareness of cystic fibrosis.
- Mr James Edward Varley, of New South Wales. For service to the community, particularly through the Tocumwal Rural Fire Brigade.
- Lieutenant Colonel Brian James Vickery (Ret'd), of New South Wales. For service to veterans, particularly through the 9th Battalion, The Royal Australian Regiment Association, and to surf lifesaving.
- Major John Roderick Vincent, Macleod of Victoria. For service to the welfare of veterans, and to the community.
- Ms Elizabeth Vines, of South Australia. For service to heritage architecture in South Australia and South East Asia.
- Ms Deanna Akke Vlam, of Western Australia. For service to the Dutch community of Western Australia through the provision of aged care services.
- Mr Barry Charles Walker, of New South Wales. For service to the wool industry as a producer, and to the community of the Yass district.
- Mr Barry John Walsh, of New South Wales. For service to Rugby League football through administrative roles in the Penrith district.
- Brother Peter Doug Walsh, of Victoria. For service to the community through the St Vincent de Paul Society.
- Mr Donald William Ward, of New South Wales. For service to the community of southern New South Wales, particularly through financial counselling services for farmers affected by drought.
- Mrs Vilma Ward, of Queensland. For service to the community of Brisbane.
- Mr Thomas William (Tom) Warne, of New South Wales. For service to television broadcasting.
- Mr Allan Russell Waterson, of Victoria. For service to the community of the Koroit district through a range of local government, health and agricultural organisations.
- Mrs Lynette Anne Watkins, of New South Wales. For service to the community through social welfare and ex-service organisations.
- Mr James Richard Watt, of Queensland. For service to the community, particularly through the 61st Battalion, Queensland Cameron Highlanders Association.
- Mr Roy Watterson, of New South Wales. For service to the community as a compere and organiser of concerts for senior citizens.
- Mrs Beryl Gwendoline Wells, of New South Wales. For service to the community through the Nepean Group of the Country Women's Association of New South Wales.
- Mr Harry William West, of New South Wales. For service to the Papua New Guinea Association of Australia.
- Mr Lyall Douglas Wheaton, of Victoria. For service to people with a disability and to the community, particularly through Rotary International.
- Dr Brian Charles Wheeler, of South Australia. For service to dentistry, and to the Royal Flying Doctor Service of Australia.
- Mr Paul Laurence Wheelton, of Victoria. For service to children and youth through a range of charitable organisations.
- Mrs Judith Anne White, of New South Wales. For service to the community through the Nepal Reconstructive Surgery Project and the Zonta Club of the Northern Beaches.
- Mr Norton John Whitmont, of New South Wales. For service to tourism, and to the Jewish community.
- Mr William Jason Whittlam, of New South Wales. For service to the arts through contributions to the understanding of 19th-century painting techniques and decoration.
- Mr Neville Francis Wilson, of Victoria. For service to the thoroughbred racing industry in regional Victoria.
- Mr Trevor Wiseman, of South Australia. For service to school sports organisations, and to athletics.
- Mr John Aaron Withers, of New South Wales. For service to veterans through the HMAS Hobart Association, and to the community.
- Professor Lun Wong, of Victoria. For service to traditional Chinese medicine as an educator and practitioner.
- Mr Barrie John Woods, of Queensland. For service to the community of the Sunshine Coast region through the Red Cross Singers.
- Mr Max Douglas Wurfel, of South Australia. For service to the community, particularly towards the preservation of the history and heritage of the Pinnaroo region.
- Mr Kenneth Hudson Youdale, DFC, of New South Wales. For service to the community, particularly through support for people affected by thalidomide, and for their families.

==== Military Division ====
===== Navy =====
- Lieutenant Robert Andrew Barb, of Australian Capital Territory. For meritorious service in the career management of the sailors of the Royal Australian Navy.
- Lieutenant Commander Gregory Michael Ryan, of New South Wales. For meritorious service to the Royal Australian Navy in the field of embarked naval aviation operations.

===== Army =====
- Warrant Officer Class Two Bernard Francis Carey, of New South Wales. For meritorious service to the development of the Australian Army's Commando capability and as the Company Sergeant Major of Delta Commando Company Group, the 4th Battalion (Commando), The Royal Australian Regiment.
- Warrant Officer Class One Bradley Allen Clarke, of Victoria. For meritorious service as the Regimental Sergeant Major of the School of Armour, the 2nd/14th Light Horse Regiment (Queensland Mounted Infantry) and Overwatch Battle Group (West) – Four.
- Warrant Officer Class One David Vance Colligan, of Victoria. For meritorious service as a Squadron Quartermaster Sergeant in the 22nd Construction Regiment and the 3rd Combat Engineer Regiment, and as the Regimental Quartermaster Sergeant of the 3rd Combat Engineer Regiment.
- Warrant Officer Class One Michael Ian Kerr, of New South Wales. For meritorious service as the Regimental Sergeant Major of the 2nd Combat Engineer Regiment and the 6th Engineer Support Regiment.
- Warrant Officer Class One Wayne Arthur Le Lievre, of Victoria. For meritorious service as the Senior Career Manager Royal Australian Corps of Transport, and as the Regimental Sergeant Major of the 7th Combat Service Support Battalion.
- Warrant Officer Class One William Patrick Maher, of Victoria. For meritorious service as a Squadron Sergeant Major and the Regimental Sergeant Major of the Special Air Service Regiment and the Special Operations Task Group.
- Warrant Officer Class One Vivianne Renée Northover, of New South Wales. For meritorious service as Warrant Officer Personnel, Headquarters 1st Joint Movement Group; Operations Warrant Officer, Joint Movement Control Office Townsville; and as Movements Officer at Joint Task Force 633 in the Middle East.
- Warrant Officer Class One Bruce Neville Walker, of Queensland. For meritorious service to the Australian Army in training and soldier development as a Wing and Regimental Sergeant Major and Senior Instructor.

===== Air Force =====
- Wing Commander Anthony Edgar Dolin, of Victoria. For meritorious service to the Royal Australian Air Force in the field of capability support.
- Group Captain Vincent Joseph Iervasi, of New South Wales. For meritorious service in the development of Australia's air combat capability and command of Number 3 Squadron.
- Wing Commander Wayne Andrew Kelly, of South Australia. For meritorious service to the Royal Australian Air Force in the field of combat support and force protection.

== Public Service Medal (PSM) ==
Public Service Medal ribbon

=== Australian Public Service ===
- Dr Ronald Francis Cameron, of New South Wales. For outstanding public service in the field of nuclear science and safety.
- Mr Ian Carruthers, of Australian Capital Territory. For outstanding public service in expanding the scope for science to support decision making on environmental matters.
- Mr Andrew Leigh (Drew) Clarke, of Australian Capital Territory. For outstanding public service in driving significant reform of the energy market.
- Ms Ellen Erika Dunne, of Australian Capital Territory. For outstanding public service in driving and leading innovation, change and improvement across Medicare Australia.
- His Excellency Mr Marc Innes-Brown, of Australian Capital Territory. For outstanding public service as Australian Ambassador to Iraq in advancing Australia's strategic, political and economic interests.
- Mrs Coral Lee McLean, CSC, of New South Wales. For outstanding public service in the management of complex and sensitive human resource issues in the Department of Innovation, Industry, Science and Research.
- Mr Timothy Andrew O'Neill, of South Australia. For outstanding public service in the development of online border protection in the Australian Customs and Border Protection Service.
- Mr Jeffrey Richard Preiss, of South Australia. For outstanding public service in the development and field deployment of infrastructure to provide increased protection and survivability to Australian Defence Force aircraft and personnel during operational activities.
- Ms Meghan Elizabeth Quinn O'Connor of Australian Capital Territory. For outstanding public service in the development of climate change policy.
- Mr Damien John Roberts, of Australian Capital Territory. For outstanding public service in the provision of advocacy services for members of the Australian Defence Force.
- Mrs Olivia Fiona Shepherd, of Tasmania. For outstanding public service in the development and implementation of Australia's electronic visa programs.
- Mr Brian Paul Stewart, of Australian Capital Territory. For outstanding public service in the development and implementation of significant reforms to information and communications technology across the Australian Government.
- Mr Michael Francis Thompson, of Australian Capital Territory. For outstanding public service in the management and handling of highly classified material for the Department of Foreign Affairs and Trade.

=== New South Wales Public Service ===
- Ms Janet Mary Anderson. For outstanding public service in the development and reform of policy frameworks for the use of resources within the New South Wales Health system.
- Ms Janice Carroll. For outstanding public service, particularly for the children and young people of New South Wales who are considered to have high and complex needs.
- Mr Athol Patrick Cook. For outstanding public service in the New South Wales Public Sector over an extended period.
- Mr John Edward Dengate. For outstanding public service, particular in the public affairs arena.
- Mr Sydney Hubert Griffith. For outstanding public service, particularly in innovative and sustained contribution to the enhancement and improvement of the technical capabilities of New South Wales Police.
- Ms Patricia Thelma Hall. For outstanding public service, particularly in the provision of educational and tourist information regarding the national parks and reserves in the South Coast region of New South Wales.
- Ms Pauline Therese McKenzie. For outstanding public service in the provision of public housing, particularly in northern New South Wales.
- Mr Barry Charles Peddle. For outstanding public service in the New South Wales Public Sector, undertaking several strategic leadership roles within TAFE New South Wales.
- Dr Larry Vogelnest. For outstanding public service as Senior Veterinarian, Taronga Conservation Society Australia.
- Mr Brian Anthony Weir. For outstanding public service to the community of Shellharbour.
- Mr Kevin Ronald Wright, of Queensland. For outstanding public service to the rail industry within New South Wales.

=== Victorian Public Service ===
- Ms Beth Maree Allen. For outstanding public service to the safety and well-being of Victoria's vulnerable children, young people and their families.
- Ms Janette Anne Bowman. For outstanding public service, particularly through national leadership and excellence in environmental health and the protection of the health of Victorians.
- Dr John Arnold Carnie. For outstanding public service in leading the advancement and protection of the health and well-being of all Victorians.
- Mr David Francis Endean. For outstanding public service in the creation of an education export industry at the Holmesglen Institute, and to the TAFE sector in general.
- Mrs Denise Anne Harrison. For outstanding public service, particularly to vulnerable children and youth in Out of Home Care and to the community service organisations that care for and support them.
- Mr Alan Douglas (Doug) Hooley. For outstanding public service, particularly in providing advice that has helped shape Victoria's parks and reserves system.
- Mr Robert Arthur Lamb. For outstanding public service and leadership within the educational community and outstanding contribution in the area of school improvement.
- Mrs Hilary Jean Makepeace. For outstanding public service to young people involved in the justice system in Victoria.
- Mr Graham John Nickless. For outstanding public service in providing excellent leadership qualities and innovation in the field of economic development throughout north-east Victoria, and for developing innovative programs that have enhanced the economic sustainability of the region.
- Mrs Pauline Mary Studham. For outstanding public service in the provision of police services in the Bass Coast and South Gippsland regions.
- Mr Dale John West. For outstanding public service in providing access to justice to the people of Bairnsdale as the Court's Registrar, in contributing to the Bail Justice system and the advocacy of the Koori Court.

=== Queensland Public Service ===
- Mr Ian Malcolm Luck. For outstanding public service to Queensland education, particularly in the Mackay region, through leadership as Deputy Principal of Mackay North State High School.
- Dr Ross Andrew McKenzie. For outstanding public service in the area of veterinary pathology and the breadth of research into plant poisoning.
- Mrs Rosslyn Ann Sigvart. For outstanding public service to Queensland Health and to the community of Dysart as Director of Nursing at Dysart Hospital.
- Ms Marjorie Ann Weber. For outstanding public service to Queensland through work on legacy issues affecting Aboriginal and Torres Strait Islander communities.

=== South Australian Public Service ===
- Mrs Kerry Pam Colbung. For outstanding public service in the delivery of services to Indigenous South Australians.
- Mr Michael John Harper. For outstanding public service in the conservation and restoration of South Australia's wetlands and in environmental management.

== Australian Fire Service Medal (AFSM) ==
Australian Fire Service Medal ribbon

=== New South Wales ===
- Mr Christopher John Barron, Fire Control Officer, Jerilderie Shire Council.
- Mr Keith Darral Butt, New South Wales Rural Fire Service.
- Mr James Downing (Jim) Chivas, New South Wales Rural Fire Service.
- Mr John Matthew McDonough, Manager of the New South Wales Fire Brigades Fire Suppression Training Section.
- Mr Robert Thomas Murray, New South Wales Fire Brigades.
- Mr Gregory Charles Pickersgill.
- Mr Alfred Kenneth Raistrick, New South Wales Rural Fire Service.
- Mr Mark Dennis Reilly, New South Wales Fire Brigades
- Mr Cecil John Robinson, New South Wales Fire Brigades
- Mr James Thomas (Jim) Smith, New South Wales Rural Fire Service.

=== Victoria ===
- Mr Geoffrey William Audsley, Metropolitan Fire Brigade.
- Mr Robert Petrus (Bob) Brinkman, Forester and Chief Ranger, Mornington Peninsula.
- Mr Liam Gerard Fogarty, Assistant Chief Fire Officer, Department of Sustainability and Environment.
- Mr David Gerrard Gibbs, Country Fire Authority.
- Mr Bruce Alan Pickett, Country Fire Authority.
- Mr James Russell Read, Country Fire Authority.
- Mr Robert William Taylor, Metropolitan Fire Brigade.

=== Queensland ===
- Mr Rowen David Clem.
- Mr John Frederick Gresty, State Manager, QFRS Air Operations Unit.
- Mr Shan Werner Raffel.
- Mr Neil Scott Reid.
- Mr Gordon Francis Ryan, Rural Fire Service.

=== Western Australia ===
- Mr Robert William Cox, Fire and Emergency Services Authority.
- Mr Kevin Robert Pollock, Mundaring District Fire Coordinator.

=== South Australia ===
- Mr Gregory Charles Frick, South Australian Metropolitan Fire Service.
- Mr Christopher George Smith, South Australian Metropolitan Fire Service.
- Mr Keith William (Sandy) Taylor, South Australian Country Fire Service.
- Mr Neil Kenneth Turner, South Australian Country Fire Service.

=== Australian Capital Territory ===
- Mr Gregory John Kent, Superintendent, ACT Fire Brigade.

== Ambulance Service Medal (ASM) ==
Ambulance Service Medal ribbon

=== Queensland ===
- Mr Robert Leslie Medlin, Queensland Ambulance Service.
- Mr Gavin John Trembath, Queensland Ambulance Service.

=== South Australia ===
- Associate Professor William Middleton Griggs, AM, of South Australia.

=== Australian Capital Territory ===
- Mrs Therese Suzanne Moore, of New South Wales, ACT Ambulance Service.

== Emergency Services Medal (ESM) ==
Emergency Services Medal ribbon

=== New South Wales ===
- Ms Debra May Scanes, President of NSW Volunteer Rescue Association.

=== Victoria ===
- Mr Colin David Croxford, Victorian State Emergency Service.
- Mr Brett Ian Ellis, Life Saving Victoria.
- Mrs Dianne Gwenyth Montalto, Royal Life Saving Society Australia.

=== Queensland ===
- Mr Kingsley Leonard Fraser, Australian Volunteer Coast Guard.
- Mr Robert Grant Hartley, Queensland State Emergency Service.
- Mr John Graham Jacobsen, Volunteer Marine Rescue Association of Queensland.

=== Western Australia ===
- Mr Arthur Barry Jones, Bush Fires Board of Western Australia.

=== South Australia ===
- Mr Grant Andrew Geyer, State Emergency Service of South Australia.

=== Australian Capital Territory ===
- Mrs Tracey Annette Foote, Majura Volunteer Unit, ACT State Emergency Service.

== Medal for Gallantry (MG) ==
Medal for Gallantry ribbon

=== Army ===
- Corporal Justin Wayne Huggett, of New South Wales. For acts of gallantry in action in hazardous circumstances while deployed in Afghanistan with the 1st Battalion, The Grenadier Guards Battle Group during Exercise Long Look 2007.

== Distinguished Service Cross (DSC) ==
Distinguished Service Cross ribbon

=== Army ===
- Major General Michael Simon Hindmarsh, AO CSC, of New South Wales. For distinguished command and leadership in action in the Middle East Area of Operations as the Commander Joint Task Force 633 for Operations Catalyst and Slipper.
- Lieutenant Colonel Christopher Andrew Websdane, of New South Wales. For distinguished command and leadership in action as commander of the Overwatch Battle Group (West) - Four during Operation Catalyst.

== Commendation for Distinguished Service ==
Commendation for Distinguished Service ribbon

=== Navy ===
- Captain Timothy Alan Brown, of New South Wales. For distinguished performance of duties in warlike operations as the Commander of Task Group 633.1 and Commanding Officer of HMAS Arunta during Operations Slipper and Catalyst.

=== Army ===
- Lieutenant Colonel Scott Gills, of Australian Capital Territory. For distinguished performance of duties in warlike operations as the Intelligence Officer and the Battle Group Chief of Staff for Overwatch Battle Group (West) - Four during Operation Catalyst in southern Iraq.
- Lieutenant Colonel Alan Kenneth Hughes, of Queensland. For distinguished performance of duties in warlike operations as the Commanding Officer of the Ninth Australian Army Training Team – Iraq from September 2007 to June 2008.
- Lieutenant Colonel Michael Anthony King, United States of America. For distinguished performance of duties in warlike operations as the Commander of the Force Level Logistic Asset, Middle East Area of Operations over the period February to August 2008.
- Corporal Luke Charles McDonald, of New South Wales. For distinguished performance of duties in warlike operations as a Mortar Section Commander of the Reconstruction Task Force Three and of the 2nd Battalion, The Royal Australian Regiment.
- Major Jayson Elliott Page, of Queensland. For distinguished performance of duties in warlike operations as the Officer Commanding the Iraqi Security Force Transition Group, Overwatch Battle Group (West) - Four in southern Iraq.
- Corporal Dylan Robert Robinson, of Queensland. For distinguished performance of duties in warlike operations as a member of Reconstruction Task Force Two on Operation Slipper in Afghanistan during 2007.

=== Air Force ===
- Wing Commander Paul Anthony Turner, of New South Wales. For distinguished performance of duties in warlike operations as the Reconnaissance Team leader and initial Detachment Commander of the Control and Reporting Centre, Afghanistan in support of Operation Slipper.

== Conspicuous Service Cross (CSC) ==
Conspicuous Service Cross ribbon

=== Navy ===
- Commander Stephen Beckmann, of New South Wales. For outstanding achievement as Director Navy Command, Control, Communications and Computers within the Royal Australian Navy's Communications and Intelligence Branch.
- Commander Katja Bizilj, of New South Wales. For outstanding achievement as Commanding Officer of the Australian Defence Force School of Languages.
- Commander Jennifer Ann Daetz, of Queensland. For outstanding achievement as the Commanding Officer at HMAS Cairns.
- Commander Peter Robert Dowton, of Australian Capital Territory. For outstanding achievement as the Weapons Electrical Engineering Officer in HMAS Melbourne, particularly during the Guided Missile Frigate Upgrade program.
- Captain Mark James Sackley, of New South Wales. For outstanding achievement in the field of logistics support to the Royal Australian Navy.

=== Army ===
- Lieutenant Colonel Adam Winiata Boyd, of New South Wales. For outstanding achievement as the Operations Officer of the Counter Improvised Explosive Device Task Force.
- Major Robert Brown, of Queensland. For outstanding achievement as the Officer Commanding Rifleman Wing, School of Infantry.
- Lieutenant Colonel Simon Timothy Johnstone, of New South Wales. For outstanding achievement in leadership and staff planning as the Staff Officer Grade One - Combat Development, Army Headquarters.
- Colonel Craig David McConachy, of Queensland. For outstanding achievement as Commander 1st Joint Movements Group, particularly in his contribution to strategic joint movements for the Australian Defence Force.
- Colonel Susan Josephine Neuhaus, of South Australia. For outstanding achievement in the provision of medical support as the Commanding Officer of the 3rd Health Support Battalion.
- Lieutenant Colonel Nicole Louise Sadler, of Australian Capital Territory. For outstanding achievement as Staff Officer Grade One Strategic Human Resources.
- Lieutenant Colonel Nicholas Hugh Stanton, of Victoria. For outstanding achievement as the Commanding Officer, Army School of Electrical and Mechanical Engineering, Army Logistic Training Centre.
- Lieutenant Colonel Harry Walden, of Queensland. For outstanding achievement as the Staff Officer Grade One Army Compliance and Assurance Framework, Army Headquarters.

=== Air Force ===
- Air Commodore Adam Rayce Brown, of New South Wales. For outstanding achievement as Officer Commanding, Air Lift Systems Program Office.
- Group Captain Alan Maurice Hemmingway, of New South Wales. For outstanding achievement as an Operations and International Law expert.
- Group Captain Richard John Keir, AM, of New South Wales. For outstanding achievement as the Commanding Officer of Number 87 Squadron.
- Group Captain Warren George McDonald, of South Australia. For outstanding achievement as Commanding Officer of Number 11 Squadron.
- Wing Commander Carl Stephen Walker, of New South Wales. For outstanding achievement as Deputy Director, National Logistics (Air), Strategic Logistics Branch, Joint Logistics Command.

== Conspicuous Service Medal (CSM) ==
Conspicuous Service Medal ribbon

=== Navy ===
- Chief Petty Officer Paul Herman Bodensteiner, of New South Wales. For meritorious achievement as the Chief Medical Regulator at Balmoral Naval Hospital, HMAS Penguin.
- Lieutenant Commander Bronwyn Adele Ferrier, of Australian Capital Territory. For meritorious achievement as the Officer-in-Charge of the Fleet Industrial Hygiene Support Unit.
- Chief Petty Officer James Stewart Lawless, of New South Wales. For meritorious achievement as the Category Manager for Physical Trainers, Training Authority Maritime Warfare, HMAS Watson
- Commander Graeme Bruce Pedley, of New South Wales. For meritorious achievement as the Chief of Staff and Staff Officer Grade One – Capability Policy and Development at the Amphibious and Afloat Support Force Element Group.

=== Army ===
- Warrant Officer Class One Michael Robert Carley, of Queensland. For meritorious achievement as a Training Developer for the Land Warfare Centre.
- Captain Grant Arthur Chambers, of Northern Territory. For meritorious achievement as the Acting Brigade Major of Headquarters 1st Brigade.
- Major Glyn Andrew Davidson, of Western Australia. For meritorious achievement as the Capability Development Officer for the Special Air Service Regiment.
- Captain Caroline Lee Kelly, of New South Wales. For meritorious achievement to the discovery, reinterment and repatriation of the Australian Army's Missing in Action personnel.
- Warrant Officer Class Two Peter Lovett, of Victoria. For meritorious achievement as the Manager Telecommunications Systems, Defence Communications Area Master Station Australia.
- Colonel Allan Arthur Murray, of New South Wales. For meritorious achievement with the 2nd Division as Assistant Commander Capability Development.
- Corporal Marcus James Randall, of Queensland. For meritorious achievement as a Section Commander within the 6th Battalion, The Royal Australian Regiment.
- Warrant Officer Class Two William Michael Shaw, of Northern Territory. For meritorious achievement in logistics support at Joint Logistics Unit (North).
- Major Andrew Shum, of Queensland. For meritorious achievement as an Instructor of Officer Training, Land Warfare Centre.
- Warrant Officer Class One Ian Patrick Sojan, of Queensland. For meritorious achievement as the Operations Warrant Officer and as the Senior Cargo Specialist Operator at the 10th Force Support Battalion.
- Warrant Officer Class One Michael James Spring, of Australian Capital Territory. For meritorious achievement as the Personnel Operations Warrant Officer, Directorate of Operations – Army.
- Warrant Officer Class Two Andrew Graeme Watt, of Queensland. For meritorious achievement in the performance of duty as Driver to the Chief of the Defence Force.

=== Air Force ===
- Flight Lieutenant Timothy James Cashman, of Victoria. For meritorious achievement in the establishment of the Airfield Engineering capability for the Royal Australian Air Force.
- Wing Commander Margot Lee Forster, of South Australia. For meritorious achievement as the Commanding Officer of Combat Support Unit Williams.
- Wing Commander Williamina Robertson Tennant, of Australian Capital Territory. For meritorious achievement as the Commanding Officer of the Royal Australian Air Force School of Administration and Logistics Training.
- Warrant Officer Darren Robert Whitford, of Queensland. For meritorious achievement as the Warrant Officer Engineering at Number 1 Squadron, specifically in enhancing F-111 aircraft operational capability.
