= Ellia Green =

Fijian rugby union & league player

Ellia Green OAM
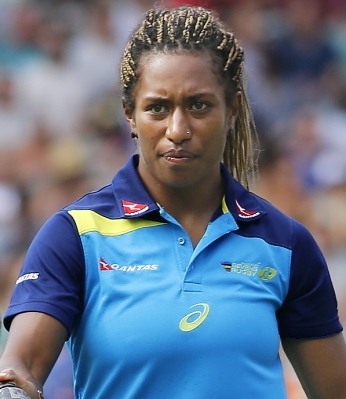
- Green in 2017, prior to his transition.
- Born: Ellia Tiriseyani Green; 20 February 1993 (age 33) Suva, Fiji
- Height: 172 cm (5 ft 8 in) (Note: World Rugby states Green's height at 171 cm, and his weight at 73 kg.; The NRL Women's Premiership (NRLW) has Green's height at 172 cm with his weight at 78 kg. These figures are as of 2020.)
- Weight: 78 kg (12 st 4 lb)

Rugby union career
- Position: Back
Amateur team(s)
Years	Team	Apps	(Points)
- Warringah
National sevens team
Years	Team		Comps
2013–2021	Australia		
- Rugby league career

Playing information
- Position: Wing
Club
Years	Team	Pld	T	G	FG	P
2020	New Zealand Warriors	3	2	0	0	8
Medal record
Women's rugby sevens
Representing Australia
Olympic Games
Gold medal – first place	2016 Rio de Janeiro	Team competition
Commonwealth Games
Silver medal – second place	2018 Gold Coast	Team competition

Ellia Tiriseyani Green OAM (born 20 February 1993) is an Australian rugby union and rugby league player. He (Note: Green uses both they/them and he/him pronouns. This article uses he/him pronouns for consistency.) was a member of the Australia rugby sevens team that won the gold medal at the 2016 Summer Olympics in Rio. He also played for the New Zealand Warriors in the NRLW.

== Early life ==
Assigned female at birth, Green was born in Suva, Fiji, and moved to Australia's Central Coast, New South Wales with his adoptive parents at the age of five. His adoptive father was Polish and died when Green was young. His adoptive mother, Yolanta, was English and died of cancer in 2018.

Green started Little Athletics at the age of six and excelled in sprinting. He spent 10 years in athletics, representing Australia in the 100m, 200m and long jump at the World Junior Championships, until his cousins convinced him to try rugby sevens. First playing for Warringah at club level and going on to debut for Australia in February 2013.

== Career ==
=== Rugby sevens ===
Green scored an 80-metre try against Canada in the three-match exhibition series at the Gold Coast Sevens, a match broadcast live on Fox Sports. Green was recruited by the Australian Rugby Sevens program after attending a Pathway to Gold Talent ID camp in Melbourne in 2012. Green was a sprinter, having previously represented Australia in athletics at the World School Games in Qatar in 2009 and scored the winning try after the siren against Canada at Twickenham in the Sevens World Series in May 2015. Representative Honours include Victoria. Green was a member of Australia's team at the 2016 Olympics, defeating New Zealand in the final to win the inaugural Olympic gold medal in the sport.

Before the 2020 Olympic Sevens took place, Green had been hampered by a knee injury for which he was not ruled out. Coach John Manenti left Green out of the squad, saying: "[it is the] toughest call of his career", adding: "[Green] just can't run as quick as [he] once could. Ultimately that's [his] weapon and strength are [his] X-factors and [he] just wasn't producing that with any consistency." Green, on Instagram said: "The past few days have been pretty long and dark since being told I haven't been selected for the Tokyo Olympics."

On 9 November 2021, Green announced his retirement from rugby sevens. He finished his career in the Sevens Series Rugby Sevens competition with 149 appearances (26th), 94 tackles, 141 tries (4th), 739 points (6th), 90 clean breaks (10th), and 244 runs (27th).

=== Rugby league ===
In September 2020, Green, along with Australia sevens teammate Evania Pelite, signed for NRL Women's Premiership (NRLW) team the New Zealand Warriors. Green was poised to sign for the Brisbane Broncos, however did not want to spend the four-week period operating under COVID-19 quarantine requirements in Queensland.

On his debut, Green scored a side-line try against the Broncos in the 8th minute. He did not score again, however remained a dangerous presence throughout the match on the wing. Green scored again in round three against the St. George Illawarra Dragons, and set up teammate Evania Pelite in a 10–22 win.

== Personal life ==
Green lives in the Sydney suburb of Lane Cove. He has a daughter with his partner Vanessa Turnbull-Roberts.

On 16 August 2022, Green came out as a transgender man. He did not change his name. The announcement made him the first Olympian to come out as a trans man. He retired from rugby to focus on his transition and said, "I knew I couldn't do hormone therapy or surgery during my career". He uses they/them and he/him pronouns.

== See also ==
- List of players who have converted from one football code to another
