= Richard Boyer (broadcaster) =

Australian broadcaster

Sir Richard Boyer KBE
- Born: 24 August 1891; Taree, New South Wales
- Died: 5 June 1961 (aged 69); Wahroonga, New South Wales
- Education: Newington College; University of Sydney
- Occupations: Wesleyan minister Grazier; Broadcasting chairman
- Spouse: Eleanor Muriel (née Underwood)

Sir Richard James Fildes (Dick) Boyer, KBE (24 August 1891 – 5 June 1961) was an Australian grazier and broadcasting chief. From 1945 until his death he served as chairman of the Australian Broadcasting Commission and the annual Boyer Lectures on Radio National are named in his honour.

== Early life, student career and military service ==
Boyer was born at Taree, New South Wales, the third and youngest son of a Wesleyan minister. He attended Wolaroi College, Orange, and Newington College (1901–1909). At the University of Sydney he graduated BA in 1913 and MA Hons in 1915. Boyer joined the Methodist ministry and in 1914 and 1915 was a probationer in the Canberra circuit.

Boyer enlisted in the Australian Army Australian Imperial Force on 2 September 1915 having previously served in the Sydney University Regiment. He was a member of the 24th reinforcements for the 1st Battalion serving on the Gallipoli Peninsula from 16 September 1915. He was commissioned holding the rank of Lieutenant, and gassed on 17 September 1917. Boyer passed through a number of hospitals and convalescent units before returning to Australia on 31 August 1918.

== Grazing career ==
Instead of returning to the ministry, Boyer became a jackeroo and in 1920 acquired a 38,652 acre (15,642 ha) property named Durella, near Morven, Queensland and married his former war nurse Eleanor Muriel Underwood. The Boyers succeeded as sheep farmers and he became president of the Warrego Graziers' Association in 1934 and, following a visit to Europe in 1935, increased his involvement in the affairs of the wool industry. As President of the United Graziers' Association of Queensland (1941–44) and of the Graziers' Federal Council of Australia (1942), he gained tax concessions for pastoral improvements and sat on the Australian Meat Industry Commission. Durella was put under management and the Boyers moved to Brisbane in 1937 and to Sydney in 1940. He sought opportunities in public service and avoided domestic politics. He was appointed honorary director of the American division of the Department of Information and in 1942 and 1945 he went abroad for conferences of the Institute of Pacific Relations. As President of the Commonwealth Council of the Australian Institute of International Affairs, he launched the journal, Australian Outlook. In the 1940s and 1950s Boyer devoted his formidable energies to the Australian national committee of the United Nations Appeal for Children, to Sydney Rotary Club's international service committee and to the Good Neighbour Council.

== Broadcasting career ==
In 1940 Boyer was appointed a member of the Australian Broadcasting Commission and five years later became chairman. With the introduction of television in 1954 the ABC was given responsibility for the national service. In 1956 Boyer was appointed a Knight Commander of the Order of the British Empire and declined the post of high commissioner to Canada. The following year he initiated the annual lectures that were later to bear his name. He died at Wahroonga and was survived by his wife, daughter and son.

== Legacy ==
Boyer stood at the center of Australia's media world, and took the lead in the subtle cultural war underway. He fought the pull of American popular culture, with its widespread popularity and the risk, he felt, of degrading the public taste. He favoured the supposedly superior traditional culture of the mother country, which appealed to upscale audiences that were representative of the nation's elite. As chairman of the Australian Broadcasting Commission, Boyer fought against commercialism because he feared it would lead to American dominance. He held up the BBC model of a publicly owned and operated broadcasting commission as being able to maintain Australia's British heritage.

Media offices
Preceded by William James Cleary	Chairman of the Australian Broadcasting Commission; 1945–1961	Succeeded by Sir James Darling
