= Helen Bayes =

Australian activist

Helen Celia Bayes (born 29 June 1944 in Sale, Greater Manchester) is an English-born activist who won the Australia's Human Rights Medal in 1999.

== Early life ==
Bayes was born into a Quaker family in Northern England and migrated to Australia in 1966, at the age of 22. She has four adult children and eight grandchildren. She holds a BA in Social Work and BA (Hons) in Social Administration, and had a 15-year career in the National and State Public Service in the areas of Social Policy and Community Services.

== Human rights activism ==
Two decades ago, Bayes resigned from the Public Service and set up an international child rights advocacy NGO called the Australian Section of Defence for Children International. She has served that organisation in Australia, in Geneva, and on the International Council. She was awarded the Australian Human Rights Medal for this work in 1999.

== Quakers ==
Bayes' concern for the rights of children grew into a fascination with early Quakerism. As Eva Koch Fellow at the Woodbrooke Quaker Study Centre, she researched the views of the earliest Quakers on the nurturing and guidance of children and young people. She was the James Backhouse Lecturer in 2003 (the Australian equivalent of the SP Gardner Lecture), entitled Respecting the Rights of Children and Young People: A New Perspective on Quaker Faith and Practice.

== Bibliography ==
- Bayes, Helen (2003). Respecting the Rights of Children and Young People: A New Perspective on Quaker Faith and Practice. Religious Society of Friends, Australia Yearly Meeting. ISBN 9780909885410.
- Prophetic Community by Helen Bayes, Canadian Quaker Pamphlet No. 69, Argenta Friends Press; a lecture to the Canadian Religious Society of Friends (2009 Sunderland P. Gardner Lecture).
- Proud Stubborn and Free: The earliest Quakers and their children, Woodbrooke Journal Essay, Winter 2003
