= Vanessa Turnbull-Roberts =

Australian lawyer and indigenous activist

Vanessa Turnbull-Roberts is an Australian human rights lawyer and Indigenous activist. She was the ACT's Aboriginal and Torres Strait Islander Children and Young People Commissioner from 2023 until her resignation in early 2026. She is the recipient of the 2019 Australian Human Rights medal.

== Career ==
Vanessa Turnbull-Roberts was appointed as commissioner for children in the Australia Capital Territory in 2023. She left her office in late 2025, after a six-month leave. During that time, some news stories reported that community members had complained of a "persistent absenteeism" of her office, and that staff members were leaving due to "leadership issues". Other complaints stated that she had bolstered her personal reputation at the cost of aiding the community. She stated in February 2026 that those complaints are "incorrect and harmful", and that she had left her office after being sexually assaulted. She said that "No one leaves work of this significance without reason."

In 2024 Turnbull-Roberts published an autobiographical book titled Long Yarn Short, detailing her childhood experiences, including what she described as her "kidnapping" by case workers. She has described Australian child welfare agencies as "the professional kidnapping industry".

In a February 2025 ACT legislative assembly hearing, she stated that "We are seeing horrific issues of child sexual exploitation in the territory, such as being sexually trafficked from one jurisdiction to another." After being asked by legislative assembly member Chiaka Barry if she had reported such cases, she said "Yes, absolutely. I am, obviously, a mandatory reporter." A year later, ACT Policing stated that they had never received any report from Turnbull-Roberts or her office. The ACT government also stated that "there ha[d] been no formal complaint regarding child sex trafficking from" her since she took office in 2024.

== Personal life ==
Turnbull-Roberts is married to rugby player Ellia Green. They had a daughter in 2022, and Green later came out as a transgender man.
