= Flora of Australia (series) =

Multivolume ongoing work about the flora of Australia

Flora of Australia Volume 1, second edition. All the books in the series have this distinctive green and yellow cover.

Flora of Australia is a 59 volume series describing the vascular plants, bryophytes and lichens present in Australia and its external territories. The series is published by the Australian Biological Resources Study, who estimate that the series when complete will describe over 20,000 plant species. It was orchestrated by Alison McCusker.

== Series ==
Volume 1 of the series was published in 1981, a second extended edition was released in 1999. The series uses the Cronquist system of taxonomy. The ABRS also published the Fungi of Australia, the Algae of Australia and the Flora of Australia Supplementary Series. An online Flora of Australia was launched by ABRS in 2017, and no more printed volumes will be published.

== Volumes published ==
1. Introduction (1st edition) 1981
1. Introduction (2nd edition) 1999

== Other Australian floras ==
A few censuses of the Australian flora have been carried out, they include

- 1793-95 - J. E. Smith - A Specimen of the Botany of New Holland
- 1804-05 - J. E. Smith - Exotic Botany
- 1804-07 - J. J. H. de Labillardière - Novae Hollandiae Plant. Spec
- 1810 - R. Brown - Prodromus Florae Novae Hollandiae et Insulae Van Diemen
- 1814 - R. Brown - Botanical Appendix to Flinders' Voyage
- 1849 - R. Brown - Botanical Appendix to C. Sturt, Narrative of an Expedition into Central Australia
- 1856 - J. D. Hooker - Introductory Essay, Flora Tasmaniae
- 1863-78 - G. Bentham - Flora Australiensis
- 1882 - F. Mueller - Systematic Census of Australian Plants
- 1889 - F. Mueller - Second Systematic Census
- 1990 - R. J. Hnatiuk - Census of Australian Vascular Plants

== See also ==
- Flora of Australia
