= Susan Neuhaus =

General surgeon and surgical oncologist

Susan Neuhaus AM CSC FRACS
- Born: Susan Josephine Evans
- Occupations: Surgeon, business director, author
- Scientific career
- Education: University of Adelaide
- Fields: surgery – directorship and author
- Thesis: Tumour metastasis and dissemination during laparoscopic surgery (2000)
- Military career
- Branch: Army, Army Reserve
- Service years: 1987–2011
- Rank: Colonel
- Awards: Conspicuous Service Cross

Susan Josephine Neuhaus (née Evans) is an Australian surgeon, non-executive director and author. Neuhaus was one of three finalists for the South Australian nomination for Australian of the Year in 2012.

== Education ==
Neuhaus graduated with MB, BS in 1989 from the University of Adelaide. She obtained Fellowship from the Royal Australasian College of Surgeons in 2003, and completed her PhD in 2000 from the University of Adelaide, in the mechanisms of the spread of cancer.

== Military career ==
Neuhaus is a graduate of Australian Command & Staff College (Res) and has served in both the Australian Army and Australian Army Reserve in clinical and combat settings.

Her operational experience included postings to Cambodia, Bougainville and Afghanistan. She was the first female doctor to be posted overseas from Australia as regimental medical officer in 1993 when she spent 9 months with the United Nations Transitional Authority in Cambodia, at the height of the AIDs epidemic.

Four years later she was posted with the Peace Monitoring Group in Bougainville and later served as Clinical Director of the multinational NATO hospital in Uruzgan Province, Afghanistan in 2009.

She retired from the Army in 2011 having achieved the rank of Colonel.

== Research ==
Neuhaus' work explores various medical and military topics, with a particular interest in women's experiences in the Australian Defence Force. She has taken an interest in the experiences of mothers deployed abroad, the contributions of female military surgeons during World War I, and the health needs of servicewomen and female veterans.

As Associate Professor of Conflict Medicine, she was involved with a developing national research collaborative approach investigating the gender specific effects of military service and deployment. This included the landmark study: Mothers in the Middle East Area of Operations (MEAO) -The health impacts of maternal deployment.

== Medical career ==
Neuhaus was admitted as a Fellow of the Royal Australasian College of Surgeons in 2003. She received the Lumley Surgical Scholarship in 2004 and worked in the Melanoma and Sarcoma Unit at Royal Marsden Hospital in London.

In 2016, Neuhaus became staff specialist in Surgical Oncology at the Royal Adelaide Hospital and Clinical Associate Professor in the Department of Surgery at the University of Adelaide. She also served on the council of the Australian Medical Association and was Chair of the Health Financing and Economics Committee.

Neuhaus Chaired the inaugural Australian National Sarcoma Guidelines committee

== Selected publications ==
- Neuhaus, Susan J & Devitt, Peter, 1947– & Neuhaus, Susan & Gormly, Kirsten L (2006). Radiology in surgical practice. Elsevier/Churchill Livingstone, Edinburgh; New York.
- Neuhaus, Susan J & Mascall-Dare, Sharon, (author.) (2014). Not for glory : a centenary of service by medical women to the Australian army and its allies. Boolarong Press, Brisbane, Australia.
- Neuhaus, Susan (2018). Images of service and sacrifice - tracing narratives in stained glass. In Journal of Military and Veterans Health. 26 (4), 26-31.
- Susan Neuhaus (2025). The Surgeon of Royaumont. Harper Collins, HQ, Chatswood, NSW.

== Awards and honours ==
- 2001 - Deputy Chief of the Australian Defence Force Reserves Prize, Joint Command and Staff College.
- 2004 - Awarded the Lumley Exchange Fellowship, Royal Australasian College of Surgeons.
- 2009 – Conspicuous Service Cross in the 2009 Queen's Birthday Honours for "outstanding achievement in the provision of medical support as the Commanding Officer of the 3rd Health Support Battalion."
- 2011 – Australian Medical Association Award for South Australia.
- 2012 – Finalist for the South Australian nomination for Australian of the Year in 2012
- 2018 – Appointed a council member of the Australian War Memorial.
- 2018 – The first woman to deliver the ANZAC Day Australian War Memorial dawn service address.
- 2019 – Inducted into the Australian Medical Association Roll of Fellows.
- 2020 – Awarded Member of the Order of Australia for significant service to medicine, to community health, and to veterans and their families.
