= ACCESS (Australia) =

ACCESS is the youth network of the Australian Institute of International Affairs, a non-government institution dealing with all aspects of Australia's foreign relations and international affairs.

Founded in 2005, ACCESS hosts forums for discussion in the tradition of the Council on Foreign Relations and Chatham House. ACCESS also produces two publications on international affairs: 'Monthly Access', an online monthly publication, and 'Quarterly Access', a more in-depth, quarterly print publication.

Currently, there are ACCESS branches in three Australian cities: Sydney, Melbourne and Canberra.
