= Bill Bristow =

Australian aviator

- Born: Sydney, New South Wales, Australia
- Died: 22/11/2025
- Education: University of Sydney
- Occupations: advertising executive (retired), charity founder/chairman (retired)
- Known for: establishing Australia's Angel Flight service.

William Morrison Bristow AM was an Australian aviator and former advertising executive.

He is best known for establishing Australia's Angel Flight service in 2003.

== Life and career ==
=== Early life ===
Bristow was born in Sydney where he was raised. He attended Barker College and then studied psychology at the University of Sydney.

=== Advertising ===
Bristow's father John Bristow was the managing director of Australia's oldest advertising agency Hansen Rubensohn which had been founded by Sim Rubensohn and Rubert Hansen in 1929. Hansen Rubensohn was taken over by American company McCann Erickson in 1959.

In 1964, Bristow commenced his own adverting career with McCann Erickson which by then was owned by Interpublic. Bristow worked for the agency in Sydney and New York. In 1970, Bristow relocated to Brisbane where he joined the agency Jones Knowles Vinnicombe Shirley as a creative director, replacing Paul Jones who had relocated to Sydney and became known for his work on the It's Time campaign.

In 1973, the agency was also bought out by Interpublic and then became known as Jones Knowles McCann Erickson. In 1978, Bristow established the Knowles Bristow agency with Bruce Knowles. When Paul Cornwell and Kevin Moreland joined the agency, it changed its name to BCM.

=== Aviation ===
Bristow gained his glider pilot's licence in 1970 before moving up to be a licensed pilot of powered aircraft and helicopters.

Identifying a need in rural Australia were local residents were required to travel long distances to access medical services at hospitals in capital cities and large regional centres, Bristow established Angel Flight in 2003.

The service which coordinates non-emergency flights for people in rural and remotes areas of Australia to access medical treatment was inaugurated with 80 volunteer pilots. By 2019, Angel Flight was operating with 3000 pilots and 4000 drivers, and had recorded 47,000 flights having carried 100,000 passengers.

In establishing Angel Flight in Australia, Bristow is also credited with establishing a system which links health professional referrals between all large city hospitals and outback clinics and remote area nurses.

Bristow retired from his role at Angel Flight in 2019.

=== Awards ===
He won the Queensland category in the Australian of the Year Awards in 2005, becoming a finalist in the national Australian of the Year Awards which was won by Western Australia's Fiona Wood.

In 2006, the Guild of Air Pilots and Air Navigators awarded Bristow the Australian Bicentennial Cup.

In the 2009 Queen's Birthday Honours, he was made a Member of the Order of Australia in recognition of his service to rural and remote communities by establishing Angel Flight.

Also in 2009, Bristow was named as a Queensland Great.

== See also ==
- Royal Flying Doctor Service
