= Human Rights Awards (Australia) =

Australian awards granted for achievement in the field of human rights

The Human Rights Awards are a series of awards for achievements in the field of human rights in Australia, bestowed by the Australian Human Rights Commission at the Human Rights Day Ceremony in December in each year.

== History ==
The Human Rights Awards were established in 1987 by the then Human Rights and Equal Opportunity Commission (HREOC) "to recognise the contributions of individuals across the nation who made it their life's mission to champion human rights, social justice, and equality for all". The award began as an event to recognise human rights in film, television and literature, but as of 2021 covers a wider spectrum. Of the original categories, only the Human Rights Medal has endured.

In 2020, owing to the COVID-19 pandemic in Australia, instead of the awards ceremony, ten "Human Rights Heroes" were recognised as finalists, including the Torres Strait 8 and Corey Tutt.

=== Past categories ===
In 1990 categories included:

- Poetry Award
- Drama Award
- Prose Award
- Film Award
- Songwriting Award
- Television Drama Award
- Television Documentary Award
- Radio Documentary/ Current Affairs Award
- Metropolitan Newspapers Award
- Regional Newspapers Award
- Magazines Award

The Literature Award, Print and Online Media Award, Radio Award, and Television Awards were discontinued in 2015.

In 2018 the categories included:

- Human Rights Medal (Highest in this awards)
- Young People's Human Rights Medal (from 2008)
- Law Award
- Business Award
- Government Award (from 2018)
- Racism. It Stops With Me Award (from 2015)
- Tony Fitzgerald Memorial Community Individual Award
- Community Organisation Award
- Media Award
- Government Award (created 2018

== Description ==
As of 2021, there are three award categories:

- Human Rights Medal
- Young People's Medal (for under-25s)
- Community Human Rights Champion

The Australian Human Rights Commission receives nominations for the Human Rights Awards and Medals categories, with the choice of recipient made by an independent panel. The individual Human Rights Award and Medal is awarded only to an individual who, to be eligible, must have made an outstanding contribution to the promotion and protection of human rights in Australia in at least one of the following areas:

- Taking action to overcome discrimination or infringements of human rights within Australia
- Encouraging greater social harmony within Australia in a range of areas such as race relations, gender equality and the treatment of children and young people
- Enhancing the rights of Indigenous Australians
- Promoting equal opportunity for people with a disability in Australia or countering discrimination on the basis of age or sexuality.
- Increasing awareness of issues of injustice or inequality in Australia.

In addition, the entrants must be a lawful resident of Australia.

The awards are usually bestowed by the AHRC on Human Rights Day (10 December) each year, with a ceremony prior to the COVID-19 pandemic, and announced online since then.

== Human Rights Medal ==
Recipients include:

- 1987 - Rose Colless OAM
- 1988 - Reverend Dorothy McMahon
- 1989 - Reverend Robert Ridley
- 1990 - Fred Hollows AC
- 1991 - Justice Michael Kirby AC, CMG
- 1992 - Eddie Mabo - Reverend Dave Passi - Sam Passi - James Rice - Celuia Mapo Salee - Barbara Hocking
- 1993 - No Medal
- 1994 - Roberta Sykes
- 1995 - Justice Elizabeth Evatt AC
- 1996 - Rebecca Peters - Robert Riley
- 1997 - Faith Bandler AM
- 1998 - Vivi Germanos-Koutsounadis
- 1999 - Helen Bayes
- 2000 - Rt Hon. Malcolm Fraser AC CH
- 2001 - Arnold "Puggy" Hunter
- 2002 - Michael Raper
- 2003 - Marion Le
- 2004 - Dick Estens - Deborah Kilroy
- 2005 - Kevin Cocks
- 2006 - Phillip Adams AO - Father Chris Riley AM
- 2007 - Jeremy Jones AM
- 2008 - Les Malezer
- 2009 - Stephen Keim SC
- 2010 - Thérèse Rein
- 2011 - Ron Merkel QC
- 2012 - Ian Thorpe OAM
- 2013 - Sister Clare Condon
- 2014 - Dorothy Hoddinott AO
- 2015 - Peter Greste
- 2016 - Pat Anderson AO
- 2017 - Johnathan Thurston
- 2018 - Justice Peter McClellan AM - Chrissie Foster
- 2019 - Rosemary Kayess
- 2020 - No Medal
- 2021 - Larissa Behrendt AO
- 2022 - Mahboba Rawi and Nawid Cina
- 2023 – Juliana Nkrumah AM
- 2024 - Rosanna Barbero
- 2025 - William Tilmouth

== Young People’s Human Rights Medal ==
Recipients include:

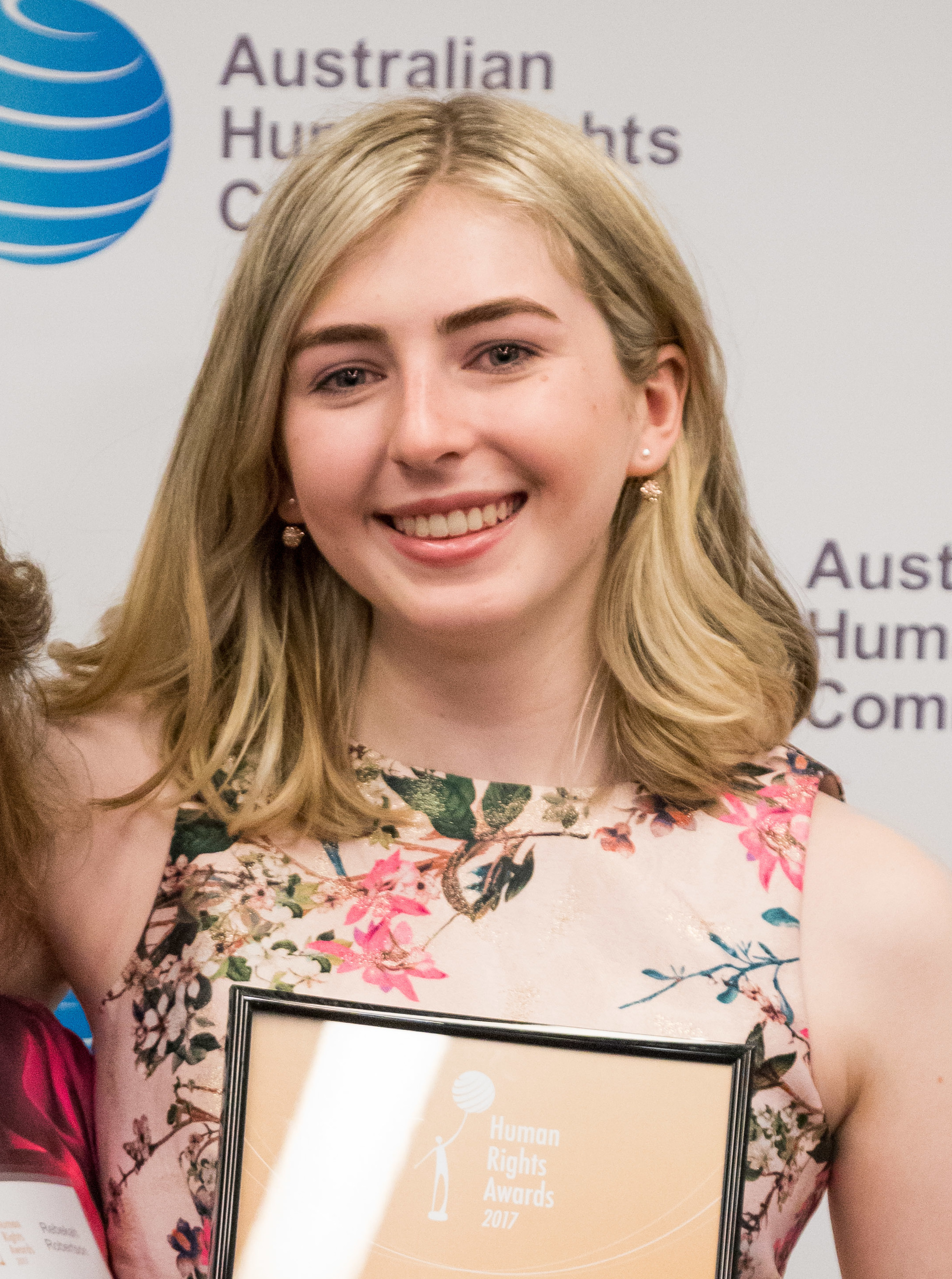
Georgie Stone

- 2008 - Alan Huynh
- 2009 - Venay Menon
- 2010 - Jack Manning Bancroft
- 2011 - Tshibanda Gracia Ngoy
- 2012 - Krista McMeeken
- 2013 - Mariah Kennedy
- 2014 - Daniel Haile-Michael and Maki Issa
- 2015 - Yen Eriksen
- 2016 - Arash Bordbar
- 2017 - Georgie Stone
- 2018 - Saxon Mullins
- 2019 - Vanessa Turnbull-Roberts
- 2020 - No Medal
- 2021 - Chanel Contos
- 2022 - Caroline Cecile Fletcher

== Tony Fitzgerald Memorial Community Individual Award ==
Named to honour Tony Fitzgerald AC QC. Recipients include:

- 2011 Lola Edwards
- 2012 Pat Anderson
- 2013 Carolyn Frohmader
- 2014 Damian Griffis
- 2015 Ludo McFerran
- 2016 Jane Rosengrave
- 2017 Barbara Elizabeth Spriggs
- 2018 Catia Malaquias
- 2019 Jasmine Cavanagh

== Racism. It Stops With Me Award ==
Finalists and recipients have been:

- 2015 Tasmanian Students Against Racism (Winner), Football Federation Victoria, Multicultural Development Association, All Together Now
- 2016 National Ethnic and Multicultural Broadcasters Council (Winner), Welcome to Australia, Beyondblue, All Together Now, Fadzi Whande, Hobsons Bay City Council
- 2017 Cohealth Arts Generator Sisters and Brothers Program (Winner), Clinton Pryor, Sean Gordon, ActNow Theatre and Reconciliation SA (joint), Multicultural Communities Council of Illawarra and Why Documentaries (joint)
- 2018 Nyadol Nyuon (winner), Mariam Veiszadeh, Welcoming Cities, E-Raced, ActNow Theatre and Reconciliation SA (joint)
- 2019 The Final Quarter, documentary film by Shark Island Productions (winner)

== Business Award ==
- 2018: Konica Minolta Australia, recognised for its leadership on the issue of modern slavery.
- 2019: STREAT

== Law Award ==
- 2019: Kate Eastman
- 2022: Jane McAdam

== Government Award ==
- 2018:
- 2019: Armidale Regional Council

== Community Organisation Award ==
- 2018: Australian Marriage Equality
- 2019: Just Reinvest NSW
- 2022: Andrea Comastri

== Non-Fiction Award ==
- 1992: Katherine Cummings, for her non-fiction work Katherine's Diary
- 1995:
  - Timothy Conigrave, for Holding The Man
  - Colin Tatz, for Obstacle Race: Aborigines in Sport

== Media Award ==
- 2019: Jess Hill, for her non-fiction work, See What You Made Me Do, about domestic violence
