= Richard Searby =

Australian lawyer (1931–2018)

Richard Henry Searby AO QC (23 July 1931 – 8 August 2018) was an Australian lawyer, company director and academic.

His father was Dr. Henry Searby, a founding member of the Royal Melbourne Hospital at Parkville and his mother, Mary Searby, was a philanthropist involved in community programs for the benefit of underprivileged people. He was born on 23 July 1931. His brother, Michael, held a doctorate in philosophy from Cambridge University and had a career as a director of companies.

He was educated first at home by his grandfather (a former headmaster of first, Essendon High School and subsequently Melbourne High School), and then at the Geelong Grammar School, where he was a school prefect. He attended Melbourne University as a resident of Ormond College for one year before leaving to study classics (Ancient Greek and Roman History and Philosophy and Ancient Greek and Latin) at Oxford University. He was awarded a BA Lit Hum (Hons) and an MA from Oxford University in 1954 (as well as a sports blue for tennis) and was then admitted to the Inner Temple. On his return to Australia, from 1956 until 1959, he was Associate to Sir Owen Dixon, Chief Justice of the High Court of Australia. He commenced practice at the Victorian Bar in 1959 and was appointed as a Queen's Counsel in 1971.

His practice was in equity, commercial and company law, constitutional law, taxation, intellectual property, banking, media law, maritime law and trade practices law. He advised the Australian Government on various occasions and he appeared in constitutional cases for both the Australian and the Victorian governments as well as clients in the private sector. He also drafted amendments to Australian and Victorian legislation, including the Federal Conciliation and Arbitration Act and Victorian adoption legislation. His final court case was an in camera appearance with respect to the application of the Victorian Adoption law to IVF.

In 1981, he and former Commissioner J. E. Taylor prepared a report for the Australian Government into the workings of the Conciliation and Arbitration Act.

From 1977 to 1992 he was chairman of Rupert Murdoch's News empire of media companies, including News Limited, News International and News Corporation. During that period he was involved in the purchase of The Times newspaper, the Hitler Diaries saga and the relocation of London-based newspaper infrastructure from Gray's Inn Road and Fleet Street to Wapping, which resulted in a year-long union protest. Rupert Murdoch was a childhood friend of Searby's with whom he shared a study at the Geelong Grammar School and attended Oxford University.

From 1961 until 1972 he was independent lecturer in law relating to executors and trustees and a member of the Faculty of Law at the University of Melbourne where he lectured Barry Jones, Labor politician and television quiz show "Pick a Box" champion.

In 2005, he was awarded an Honorary Doctorate of Laws from Deakin University where he was Chancellor from 1997. He was awarded an Order of Australia (AO) in 2006 for his services to education, as a contributor to the programs of major cultural institutions, business and the law, the first of which formed a symbiosis with the vocation of his grandfather.

Searby was married to Caroline McAdam, with whom he has three sons. McAdam died on 25 January 2014.

Searby died, aged 87, on 8 August 2018.

== Positions of responsibility ==
Searby was a leading member of Australia's legal fraternity and held several directorships of Australian and international corporations, including:

- Chancellor of Deakin University from 1997 to 2005.
- Director of Rio Tinto Ltd from 1977 until 1997 and a director of Rio Tinto PLC from 1995 until 1997.
- Director of News Corporation Ltd from 1979 until 1992 and chairman from 1981 until 1991; a director of News Ltd from 1977 until 1992 and chairman from 1981 until 1992; a director of News International PLC (UK) from 1981 until 1992 and chairman from 1983 until 1990
- Chairman of the Geelong Grammar School Council from 1983 until 1989.
- Director of the South China Morning Post Ltd (HK) from 1986 until 1992, and chairman from 1987 until 1992.
- Director of News Datacom Ltd (UK) from 1987 until 1992 and chairman from 1987 until 1992.
- Director of Shell Australia Ltd from 1977 until 1998; a director of the Shell Australia Superannuation Fund Pty Ltd from 1993 until 1998.
- National President of the Australian Institute of International Affairs from 1993 until 1997.
- Director of BRL Hardy Ltd from 1992 until 2003.
- Director of Amrad Corporation Ltd from 1993 until 2003.
- Director of Quadrant Inc from 1987 until 2003.
- Director of Tandem Australia Pty Ltd from 1992 until 1998.
- Director and Deputy Chairman of Times Newspapers Holdings Ltd (UK) since 1981.
- Director of Reuters Founders Share Co Ltd (UK) from 1987 until 1993.
- Director of Woodside Petroleum Ltd from 1998 until 2004.
- Member of the Council of the National Library of Australia from 1992 until 1995.
- Member of the Council of the Museum of Victoria from 1990 until 1998.
