= Allan Gyngell =

Australian diplomat and public servant (1947–2023)

Professor Allan Gyngell AO FAIIA
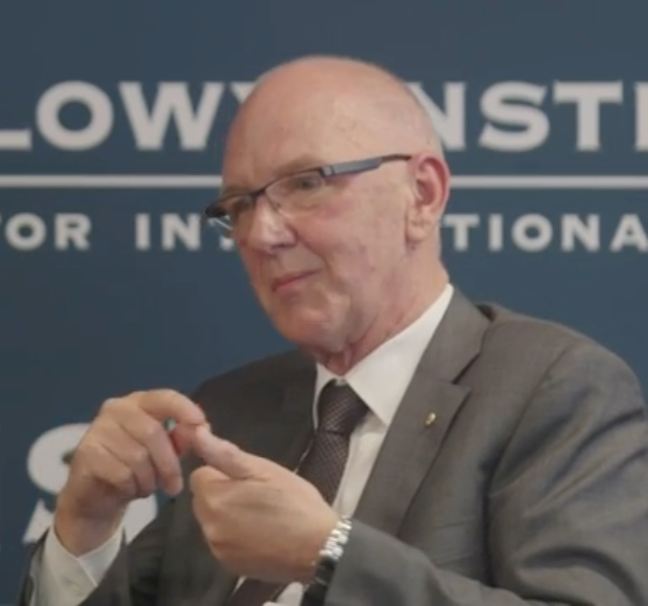
- In a Lowy Institute discussion in 2017

Director-General of the Office of National Assessments
- In office 2009–2013
- Preceded by: Peter Varghese
- Succeeded by: Richard Maude

Personal details
- Born: Allan Grantley Gyngell; 19 June 1947 Sydney, New South Wales, Australia
- Died: 3 May 2023 (aged 75) Canberra, Australian Capital Territory, Australia
- Spouse: Catherine Gyngell
- Occupation: Public servant Diplomat

Allan Grantley Gyngell AO (19 June 1947 – 3 May 2023) was an Australian public servant and diplomat who served as the director-general of the Office of National Assessments (ONA) as well as the national president of the Australian Institute of International Affairs (AIIA) from 2017 until his death in 2023.

== Career ==
Gyngell began his career in 1969 at the Department for External Affairs (the precursor to the Department of Foreign Affairs and Trade (DFAT)). In the intermediary period, Gyngell would serve as a foreign policy officer at DFAT, serving as a diplomat at Rangoon between 1970 and 1972, Singapore between 1973 and 1976 and Washington D.C. between 1981 and 1984. Ultimately, by 1991, he was posted as the first assistant secretary at the Department of the Prime Minister and Cabinet (PM&C); a job he continued until 1993. By 1993, Gyngell became the senior international advisor to the prime minister, Paul Keating until his election defeat in 1996. As an advisor to Keating, Gyngell led secret negotiations between Australia and Indonesia, leading to the 1995 Australia-Indonesia Security Agreement. Additionally, he worked closely in the APEC Summit in 1993 at Seattle.

Gyngell was also a founding executive director of the Lowy Institute as well as being offered an honorary professorship at the Australian National University (ANU) from 2003. In 2009, he was made the director-general of the Office of National Assessments (ONA); a position he would hold until his retirement in 2013.

As part of his retirement, the Australian Institute of International Affairs (AIIA) appointed him their national president in September 2017, succeeding Kim Beazley. He would continue in this role until his death in 2023. He was later succeeded by Heather Smith at the AIIA.

Gyngell died in May 2023, at the age of 75, after a short illness with cancer.

== Honours ==
In the 2009 Queen's Birthday Honours, Gyngell was conferred the status of an Officer in the Order of Australia (AO) "for service to international relations through contributions to the development of public and governmental debate on foreign and security policy". Later, he became a fellow of the Australian Institute of International Affairs (FAIIA) in 2010.

== Selected work ==
- Gyngell, Allan (16 August 2021). Fear of Abandonment: Australia in the World since 1942. La Trobe University Press. ISBN 9781741362626.
