= Rita Ryack =

American costume designer

- Born: Boston, Massachusetts, U.S.
- Education: Brandeis University Yale School of Drama
- Occupation: Costume designer
- Years active: 1983-present
- Notable work: Hairspray; Casino; Bad Music Video
- Awards: New York Women in Film & Television (Designing Women 2000); Costume Designers Guild Award (2001)

Rita Ryack is a costume designer who was nominated for an Academy Award for Best Costume Design at the 73rd Academy Awards for her work in How the Grinch Stole Christmas. She was also nominated for a Tony Award at the 37th Tony Awards for My One and Only, and was nominated for the award again in 2014, for Casa Valentina. She received a further nomination at the 62nd Primetime Emmy Awards for the film You Don't Know Jack.

== Career ==
Rita Ryack was born in Boston, Massachusetts. She received her BFA from Brandeis University in Waltham, Massachusetts and later her MFA from Yale School of Drama. She began her work in the entertainment industry as a cartoon animator for Lisberger Studios in Boston.

Her first design job was for the Broadway musical My One and Only, for which she earned her first Tony nomination. Throughout the years she has done costume design for a wide range of productions such as films like Hairspray, Casino, and Apollo 13, many on and off Broadway theater productions, as well as the music video for Bad by Michael Jackson.

Notably she has, many times, worked with Martin Scorsese, Ron Howard, and Robert De Niro.

While designing for productions such as the Broadway play Casa Valentina she references old advertisements, photographs, and films for inspiration.

== Selected works ==
Hair (musical) (2014)	Theater	
Casa Valentina (2014	Theater	Tony Award Nominee Best Costume in a Play
The Smurfs 2 (2013)	Film	
Rock of Ages (2012)	Film	
You Don't Know Jack (2010)	Film	Emmy Nominee Outstanding Costumes for a Miniseries, Movie or a Special
Bedtime Stories (2008)	Film	
Hairspray (2007)	Film	
Charlotte's Web (2006)	Film	
The Cat in the Hat (2003)	Film	
A Beautiful Mind (2001)	Film	
Rush Hour 2 (2001)	Film	
How the Grinch Stole Christmas (2000)	Film	Costume Designers Guild Award, Golden Satellite Awards 2001, Academy Award Nominee Best Costume Design, Saturn Awards Nominee
Bringing Out the Dead (1999)	Film	
My Giant (1998)	Film	
Wag the Dog (1997)	Film	
Ransom (1996)	Film	
Apollo 13 (1995)	Film	
Casino (1995)	Film	
Mr. Jones (1993)	Film	
A Bronx Tale (1993)	Film	
Mad Dog and Glory (1993)	Film	
Cape Fear (1991)	Film	
Class Action (1991)	Film	
Penn and Teller Get Killed (1989)	Film	
Crossing Delancey (1988)	Film	
After Hours (1985)	Film	
A Lie of the Mind (1985)	Theater	
My One and Only (musical)	Theater	Tony Award Nominee Best Costume in a Musical, Drama Desk Award Nominee.
