= Australian Institute of International Affairs =

Australian think tank

- Abbreviation: AIIA
- Formation: 1924 (Foundation of New South Wales branch of the Royal Institute of International Affairs); 1933 (Federation of New South Wales, Victoria, and Queensland Branches as the Australian Institute of International Affairs)
- Type: Think tank
- National President: Heather Smith
- National Executive Director: Bryce Wakefield
- Website: internationalaffairs.org.au

The Australian Institute of International Affairs (AIIA) is an Australian research institute and think tank which focuses on International relations. It publishes the Australian Journal of International Affairs. It is one of the oldest active private research institutes in Australia.

The current National President of the AIIA is Heather Smith who succeeded Allan Gyngell, the former executive director of the Australian Office of National Assessments. The current National Executive Director is Bryce Wakefield.

== Overview ==
The institute's current mission statement is that it wants Australians to "know more, understand more, and engage more in international affairs." According to the institute's then-president, Richard Boyer, writing in 1947:

The day is long past when the issues covered by the Institute are matters of intellectual and group concern only. The Institute is designed to leave its mark to some good purpose on the actual turn of events. It does so not by espousing any policy – indeed, it is strictly prevented by its constitution from endorsing or propagating any point of view. It does aim, however, to strike firmly at the heart of the problem by setting up means whereby research into international issues may be carried out and information of a factual nature may be disseminated, and also to act as a forum wherein those competent not only to give information but to express views may do so without any limitation and without unwanted publicity.

The AIIA Constitution still prevents the institute from endorsing any position on international affairs. In contrast to other think tanks that focus on providing the government with policy advice, key officers of the institute emphasise the AIIA's role as a forum for public discussion. According to the institute's National Executive Director Dr Bryce Wakefield the AIIA is "completely apolitical, so we can genuinely say that we are not pushing an agenda and we are not promoting our own people."

== Structure and location ==
The institute is a registered association with charity status. It is a membership organisation with a federal structure and branches located in the capitals of seven Australian states and territories. Each branch of the institute has its own constitution, maintains a local membership and council and in turn is a "member" of the national body. A representative from each branch, usually the branch president, sits on the National Board, the governing body of the institute, along with other directors. The National Office of the institute, headed by a National Executive Director answerable to the board, coordinates the branches, organises research, and directs the institute's activities with federal and international partners. The National Office is located at Stephen House in Deakin, Canberra, which was built specifically for the institute in 1987. The Victoria Branch is located at Dyason House in Melbourne, the New South Wales Branch is located in the Glover Cottages, Sydney, and the Australian Capital Territory Branch also operates out of Stephen House.

== History ==
The origins of the institute can be traced to the Paris Peace Conference of 1919 that followed the First World War. Participants at that conference believed public opinion was vital in the development of foreign policy. To help create an informed public debate a number of organisations, including the American Council of Foreign Relations and the Royal Institute of International Affairs in the United Kingdom, were established to promote an understanding of international affairs. Richard Boyer, an early president of the AIIA, stated that "international affairs have ceased to be the sole preserve of foreign offices and specially trained diplomats, and have become not only the concern but the responsibility of the people of the world, and most directly of the people of the democracies".

The institute was formed in the 1920s as an affiliate of the Royal Institute of International Affairs. It became a federal body in 1933 and was established to provide an "objective, scientific study of international affairs. Its purpose is to stimulate interest in and promote understanding of international affairs, including politics, economics and international law". The institute adopted the Chatham House Rule to encourage free and frank discussion. In the early decades of its existence, the AIIA received significant research funding from the Institute of Pacific Relations (IPR), an American non-governmental organisation that provided a forum for the discussion of political issues facing the countries of the Pacific rim. Some AIIA members were concerned that the IPR was "a vehicle for American influence which, in zero-sum terms, was assumed would displace that of Britain".

Prior to the separation of the Department of External Affairs from the Prime Minister's Department, the institute "filled a gap by providing a forum for the discussion of Australia's external interests. Accordingly, the 1930s and 1940s were the period of greatest influence for the AIIA". The institute's role in developing Australia's place in the world is signified by the fact that it was the first organisation to use the term "Australian Foreign Policy" as a book title, in 1934. Until the 1960s, "the AIIA, especially through its journal Australian Outlook (founded in 1947 [later the Australian Journal of International Affairs]), was unrivalled as a focus for analysis and debate in the fields of foreign and security policy."

During the 1970s, when Australian foreign policy and the Asia-Pacific region were undergoing considerable change, the institute failed to expand. Gough Whitlam, the Australian Prime Minister at the time, wrote a message to the institute in 1972 that actively encouraged it to help inform public opinion on the rapid changes underway in Australia's neighbourhood.

After the arrival in the 2000s of professional think tanks in Australia such as the Lowy Institute and the Australian Strategic Policy Institute, the latter owned by the Australian government, the community-based AIIA "strengthened its think tank dimensions."

== Office holders ==
The institute is led by a national president, with day to day leadership of the national office provided by a national executive director. There are several other office holders, including the institute's treasurer, research chair, and editor of the Australian Journal of International Affairs. The branches of the institute similarly have their own various officers and are led by branch presidents, and the New South Wales, Victoria, and Queensland branches were all led by presidents prior to the foundation of the national body of the institute.

AIIA National President	
Name	Term
Archibald Charteris	1933–1934
Stephen Henry Roberts	1934–1936
Thomas Bavin	1936–1941
Ian Clunies Ross	1942–1945
Philip Phillips	1945–1946
Richard Boyer	1946–1949
Norman Lethbridge Cowper	1949–1950
Tristan Buesst	1951–1954
David Campbell	1955–1958
John Andrews	1958–1961
Gordon Greenwood	1961–1965
Norman Harper	1965–1970
Thomas Stapleton	1970–1972
Garfield Barwick	1972–1983
Russel Madigan	1983–1988
R.J. White	1988–1991
Garry Woodard (1929–)	1991–1993
Richard Searby (1931–2018)	1993–1998
Neal Blewett (1933–)	1998–?
	??
John McCarthy	?–2017
Kim Beazley (1948–)	2015–2017
Allan Gyngell (1947–2023)	2017–2023
Heather Smith	2023

== See also ==
- Australian Strategic Policy Institute (ASPI)
- ACCESS
- Australian Journal of International Affairs
- Singapore Institute of International Affairs (SIIA) – sister institute from Singapore
