= 2020 NRL Women's season results =

The 2020 NRL Women's Premiership is the third season of professional women's rugby league in Australia. The competition will be coinciding with the 2020 NRL Finals Series.

== Round 1 ==
Home	Score	Away	Match Information			
Home	Score	Away	Date and Time	Venue	Referee	Attendance
Sydney Roosters	18 – 4	St. George Illawarra Dragons	Saturday 3 October, 11:30 am AEST	GIO Stadium	Liam Kennedy	
Brisbane Broncos	28 – 14	New Zealand Warriors	Saturday 3 October, 3:00 pm AEST	GIO Stadium	Henry Perenara	
Source: NRL.com

== Round 2 ==
Home	Score	Away	Match Information			
Home	Score	Away	Date and Time	Venue	Referee	Attendance
New Zealand Warriors	12 – 22	Sydney Roosters	Saturday 10 October, 12:30 pm AEDT	Bankwest Stadium	Drew Oultram	
St. George Illawarra Dragons	4 – 18	Brisbane Broncos	Saturday 10 October, 4:00 pm AEDT	Bankwest Stadium	Belinda Sharpe	
Source: NRL.com

== Round 3 ==
Home	Score	Away	Match Information			
Home	Score	Away	Date and Time	Venue	Referee	Attendance
St. George Illawarra Dragons	10 – 22	New Zealand Warriors	Saturday 17 October, 12:30 pm AEDT	ANZ Stadium	Belinda Sharpe	
Sydney Roosters	16 – 24	Brisbane Broncos	Saturday 17 October, 4:00 pm AEDT	ANZ Stadium	Liam Kennedy	
Source: NRL.com

== Grand Final ==
Sunday, 25 October
4:05pm AEDT

Brisbane Broncos	20 – 10	Sydney Roosters
Upton (3') 1 Hall (8') 1 Lenarduzzi (34') 1 Harden (44') 1 Goals: Ward 2/4 (5', 9')	report	Meakes (13') 1 Dodd (25') 1 Goals: Temara 1/2 (26')

ANZ Stadium
Referee: Belinda Sharpe
