= Dick Estens =

Australian businessman

- Born: 1949 (age 76–77); Gilgandra, New South Wales, Australia
- Education: All Saints College, Bathurst
- Known for: Cotton growing Aboriginal reconciliation
- Political party: The Nationals
- Board member of: Aboriginal Employment Strategy; Reconciliation Australia; Moree Plains Health Service; Barwon Health Service; Gwydir Valley Cotton Growers Association
- Awards: HREOC Human Rights Medal (2004); Rural Leader of the Year (2000)

Richard Lucas Estens AO (born 1949 in Gilgandra, New South Wales) is an Australian cotton farmer and businessman.

== Early life ==
Estens was born in Gilgandra and was brought up on a property close to the town. He was educated at All Saints College in Bathurst. After leaving school early he became an aircraft pilot.

== Cotton farming ==
In 1981, Estens started farming cotton on a property near Moree.

== Public life ==
=== Aboriginal Employment Strategy ===
In 1997, with the support of the Gwydir Valley Cotton Growers Association, Estens established the Aboriginal Employment Strategy with the goal of providing support for Aboriginal people in Moree who were looking to enter the job market. One of the motivations behind the establishment of the AES was a recommendation from the 1991 Royal Commission into Aboriginal Deaths in Custody that employment promotion committees be established across the country.

=== Estens Report ===
The Howard government commissioned Estens to head the "Regional Telecommunications Inquiry" into the proposed sale of Telstra. In late 2002 he delivered what became known as the Estens Report to the government.

=== Recognition ===
In 2004 Estens was awarded the Human Rights Medal by the Human Rights and Equal Opportunity Commission.

Estens was made an Officer of the Order of Australia in June 2009.
