= Australian Journal of International Affairs =

- Discipline: International relations
- Language: English

Publication details
- Former name(s): Australian Outlook, Austral-Asiatic Bulletin
- Publisher: Routledge (Australia)

Standard abbreviations
- ISO 4: Aust. J. Int. Aff.

Links
- Journal homepage

The Australian Journal of International Affairs is an academic journal that was established in 1947 as Australian Outlook. It is published by Routledge on behalf of the Australian Institute of International Affairs. Its forerunner was the Austral-Asiatic Bulletin, which was published from 1936 by the Victorian Branch of the Institute until the Institute decided that it needed a journal "so that each branch of the AIIA could feel ownership of the publication." It has been suggested that a focus on the Australian war effort and destruction of Europe during World War II made the focus on the "Asiatic" outdated and prompted the editors of the new journal to name it Australian Outlook. The journal marked a shift in focus for Australian International Relations scholarship which until then, and reflected in the Austral-Asiatic Bulletin considered questions of the development of the internal territories of Australia, particularly the Northern Territory, as an "international" question.

The editors-in-chief are Ian Hall and Sara Davies (Griffith University). Earlier editors include Nick Bisley (La Trobe University), Andrew O'Neil (Griffith University), Michael Wesley (Griffith University), and William T. Tow (Australian National University).

== Bibliography ==
- Davis, Alexander E. (2021). "Making a settler colonial IR: Imagining the 'international' in early Australian International Relations". Review of International Studies. 47 (5): 637–655. doi:10.1017/S026021052000025X. ISSN 0260-2105.
