= Casa Susanna =

1960s destination for cross-dressing

Coordinates: 42.251235°N 74.242809°W

Susanna Valenti posing by her sign

Casa Susanna was a popular weekend destination in Jewett, New York, in the United States, for cross-dressing men and transgender women in the early 1960s. The bungalow camp was run by Susanna Valenti and her wife Maria Tornell, who also ran a wig store in town.

== History ==
Tornell purchased the 150 acre property in the mid-1950s; originally, the couple had dubbed it Chevalier D'Eon Resort. They charged $25 for a weekend's stay, which included food, lodging, and lessons in makeup.

Hidden away in the rural Catskills, Casa Susanna provided privacy to its guests, in a time when public cross-dressing was a criminal offense across most of America. However, guests occasionally visited the town of Hunter to shop, where they were met by a range of reactions. Some were negative, but many locals saw them as reliable customers. Casa Susanna was a haven for its guests to celebrate their "inner girl" without persecution, and acted as an important space within which guests were allowed to comfortably and happily participate in activities such as gardening and board games whilst expressing their gender identity or inner desire to cross-dress.

Most guests at Casa Susanna were married, and considered themselves heterosexual men who enjoyed cross-dressing, but many others later identified as transgender and lived out their lives as women, including Virginia Prince and Valenti herself.

Casa Susanna also offered photography, having appointed one of their guests, Andrea Susan, as their official photographer. In doing so, Casa Susanna avoided the possibility of sending the negatives to a professional developer who might later call the police, and allowed for affirming photographs of their guests to be taken as a souvenir and as a source of affirmation for their gender expression.

Susan took many photographs of her fellow guests and developed them at home; though Polaroid cameras were available at the time, Susan used a film camera that required the use of negatives instead, and put the negatives in the possession of her photography mentor Dick, who had gifted her her photography equipment. However, when Dick later married, these negatives were thrown away, eventually making their way to a Manhattan flea market in the mid-2000s. There, they were found by Robert Swope, "a gentle punk rocker turned furniture dealer", who bought every photograph he could find and published them in a book with his partner Michel Hurst. The release of the book Casa Susanna, fifty years after many of the photographs themselves were taken, led to many former attendees of Casa Susanna coming forward to share their experiences, allowing Casa Susanna to be documented.

== Influence ==
The book Casa Susanna, based on a collection of photographs from the site, inspired the Tony-nominated play Casa Valentina by Harvey Fierstein.

Casa Susanna, a documentary film by Sébastien Lifshitz, debuted at the 79th Venice International Film Festival.

From July 21, 2025 to January 25, 2026, the Metropolitan Museum of Art displayed Casa Susanna, an exhibition of photographs and publications by and for the community. The exhibit was organized by the Art Gallery of Ontario and Les Rencontres d’Arles.

== See also ==
- Gay villages
- List of gay villages
