= Irene Gleeson =

Australian aid worker

Irene Gleeson AO (30 December 1944 – 21 July 2013) was a Christian missionary to the children of Kitgum District, northern Uganda, whose lives were disrupted first by war then by HIV/AIDS. She was awarded an Officer of the Order of Australia in 2009 for "service to international relations, particularly through sustained aid for children affected by war and HIV-AIDS in Northern Uganda"

Gleeson first came to war-torn Northern Uganda in 1992, after selling her beach-side Northern Beaches home in Sydney. She parked her caravan in the Lord's Resistance Army territory close to the then-border of Sudan, and over the years built her orphan school around it.

Initially, Gleeson didn't want to leave, but as an orphan herself, her life had seen its fair share of sadness, and she felt it was her chance to give back and save a child from the life she once lived. Gleeson sat under a large mango tree as the locals sussed out the strange white lady. Nobody knew any English and they weren't quite sure why she was there. The language barrier was a problem, but slowly she sang to the children who meekly sat beside her, eventually teaching them English by writing in the dirt and doing puppet shows.

In 2007 Cinderella Children, a video documentary, was produced by Grant Windle about Gleeson's charity work in Uganda.

On 21 July 2013, Gleeson died, after a yearlong battle with cancer, surrounded by her family in Sydney. Her work lives on through the Irene Gleeson Foundation (IGF) (in the US, www.IGFUSA.org).

The Irene Gleeson Foundation now provides:

- Full day care, Schooling, Food, counseling and Medical care for 5 schools and 8,000 children.
- Tertiary Training College for Young Adults.
- Medical Clinics and Malnourished Feeding Program.
- Gloryland Junction AIDS Hospice & Infant Orphanage.
- Community Churches.
- FM Radio Station 'Mighty Fire FM'
- Cultural Arts Studio
- Water Bores for Communities
- Capacity Training for 450 professional Staff
