= Casa Valentina =

2014 play by Harvey Fierstein

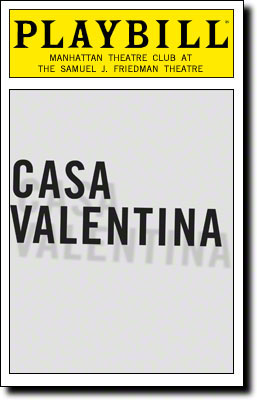
Casa Valentina Playbill

Casa Valentina is a 2014 American play written by Harvey Fierstein which premiered on Broadway in April 2014 and opened in London in September 2015. It tells the story of men who spend weekends at a resort in the Catskill mountains, dressed as women.

== Background ==
The play was suggested by the book Casa Susanna, written by Michel Hurst and Robert Swope, which collected photographs from a cross-dressing resort of the same name.

== Productions ==
Casa Valentina premiered on Broadway at the Samuel J. Friedman Theatre in a Manhattan Theatre Club production on April 1, 2014 in previews, officially on April 23, 2014. Directed by Joe Mantello, the cast featured Patrick Page (George/Valentina), Gabriel Ebert (Jonathon/Miranda), John Cullum (Terry), Reed Birney (Charlotte), Tom McGowan (Bessie), Larry Pine (The Judge/Amy) and Mare Winningham (Rita). Scenic design was by Scott Pask, costumes by Rita Ryack and lighting by Justin Townsend. The play had music by Fitz Patton, with Christopher Gattelli as dance consultant. The play closed on June 29, 2014 after 79 performances and 24 previews.

The play made its London debut at the Southwark Playhouse on September 10, 2015 in previews, running through October 10. Directed by Luke Sheppard, the cast featured Tamsin Carroll (Rita), Ben Deery (Miranda), Charlie Hayes (Eleanor), Bruce Montague (Terry), Robert Morgan (Amy), Matt Rixon (Bessie), Ashley Robinson (Gloria), Gareth Snook (Charlotte) and Edward Wolstenholme (Valentina).

The play made its Chicago debut with Pride Films and Plays on August 22, 2019 in previews, running through September 29. Directed by Michael D. Graham, the cast featured Patrick Byrnes (George/Valentina), Micah Kronlokken (Jonathan/Miranda), Kingsley Day (Terry), Danne W. Taylor (Charlotte), Michael Hagedorn (Bessie), Robert Koon (The Judge/Amy), Josh Marshall (Michael/Gloria), Nicholia Q. Aguirre (Rita), and BethAnn Smukowski (Eleanor).

== Plot ==
Casa Valentina is a small hotel in the resort area of the Catskill Mountains in New York. In the early 1960s, Casa Valentina has, as guests, heterosexual men who dress and act as women. They are faced with a decision whether to become an official organization.

== Critical reception ==
The reviewer for theatermania wrote that Casa Valentina is "far and away the best new play of the season." Ben Brantley, writing for the New York Times, praised the performances and the first half of the script but critiqued the second half, calling its tone didactic.

=== Original Broadway production ===
Year	Award	Category	Nominee	Result
2014	Tony Award	Best Play	Harvey Fierstein	Nominated
2014	Tony Award	Best Performance by a Featured Actor in a Play	Reed Birney	Nominated
2014	Tony Award	Best Performance by a Featured Actress in a Play	Mare Winningham	Nominated
2014	Tony Award	Best Costume Design of a Play	Rita Ryack	Nominated
2014	Drama Desk Award	Outstanding Featured Actor in a Play	Reed Birney	Won
2014	Outer Critics Circle Award	Outstanding New Broadway Play		Nominated
2014	Outer Critics Circle Award	Outstanding Featured Actress in a Play	Mare Winningham	Won
2014	Drama League Award	Distinguished Production of a Play		Nominated
