= Alison McCusker =

Australian botanist (1933–2015)

Alison McCusker OAM (born 13 September 1933, Tocumwal, died 18 December 2015, Canberra) was an Australian botanist and science administrator noted for orchestrating the creation of the multi-volume Flora of Australia while serving as the first Director of Flora Programs at Australian Biological Resources Study. In 1987 McCusker became Deputy Director of the International Plant Genetic Resources Institute, a branch of the United Nations Food and Agriculture Organization (FAO). McCusker was a 2009 recipient of the Medal of the Order of Australia for her work on the Flora of Australia.
