= Casa Susanna (film) =

- Directed by: Sébastien Lifshitz
- Written by: Sébastien Lifshitz
- Produced by: Muriel Meynard
- Cinematography: Paul Guilhaume
- Edited by: Tina Baz
- Production companies: Agat Films; Arte; American Experience Films
- Release date: August 31, 2022 (Venice)
- Running time: 97 minutes
- Countries: United States; France
- Language: English

Casa Susanna is an American-French documentary film, directed by Sébastien Lifshitz and released in 2022. The film portrays the history of Casa Susanna, a private resort in the Catskills region of New York which served as a haven for transgender women and heterosexual cross-dressing men in the early 1960s before the dawn of the LGBT liberation movement.

The film premiered at the 79th Venice International Film Festival on August 31, and had its North American premiere at the 2022 Toronto International Film Festival on September 9. It aired on American Experience on June 27, 2023.
