= Taxonomy of Adenanthos =

Genus in plant family Proteaceae

George Bentham's taxonomic arrangement of Adenanthos was the first comprehensive taxonomic arrangement of that plant genus. It was published in 1870 in his landmark flora of Australia, Flora Australiensis. It would stand for over a hundred years before being superseded by the 1978 arrangement of Ernest Charles Nelson.

== Background ==
Adenanthos is a genus of around 30 species in the plant family Proteaceae. Endemic to southern Australia, they are evergreen woody shrubs with solitary flowers that are pollinated by birds and, if fertilised, develop into achenes. They are not much cultivated. Common names of species often include one of the terms woollybush, jugflower and stick-in-the-jug.

The first known botanical collection of Adenanthos was made by Archibald Menzies during the September 1791 visit of the Vancouver Expedition to King George Sound on the south coast of Western Australia. However this did not lead to publication of the genus. Jacques Labillardière collected specimens of A. cuneatus from Esperance Bay the following year, and in 1803 Jean Baptiste Leschenault de la Tour collected the same two species as Menzies had 12 years earlier. Labillardière published the genus in 1805, in his Novae Hollandiae Plantarum Specimen, based on the specimens collected by himself and Leschenault. The genus was given the name Adenanthos from the Greek αδην (aden-, "gland") and ανθοσz (-anthos, "flower"), in reference to the prominent nectaries. By 1870, 13 species had been published. That year, Bentham published the fifth volume of his Flora Australiensis, in which was contained a treatment of the plant family Proteaceae, including Adenanthos.

== Bentham's arrangement ==
In his treatment of Adenanthos, Bentham published a fourteenth species, and the first infrageneric arrangement: he divided the genus into two taxonomic sections, A. sect. Eurylaema and A. sect. Stenolaema, based on the shape of the perianth tube: members of A. sect. Eurylaema have perianth tubes that are curved and swollen above the middle, whereas members of A. sect. Stenolaena have perianth tubes that are straight and unswollen. The full arrangement is as follows:

Adenanthos

A. sect. Eurylaema

A. barbigera (now A. barbiger)
A. obovata (now A. obovatus)

A. sect. Stenolaena (now A. sect. Adenanthos)

A. cuneata (now A. cuneatus)
A. Cunninghamii (now A. × cunninghamii)
A. pungens
A. venosa (now A. venosus)
A. Dobsoni (now A. dobsonii)
A. linearis
A. sericea (now A. sericeus)
A. Meissneri (now A. meisneri)
A. filifolia (now A. filifolius)
A. terminalis
A. flavidiflora (now A. flavidiflorus)
A. apiculata (now A. apiculatus)

== Legacy ==
Bentham's arrangement stood for over a hundred years, by which time a number of new species had been discovered, rendering Bentham's treatment "very inadequate and incomplete". His division of the genus into two sections based on perianth shape is still accepted today, but changes in the laws of botanical nomenclature mean that A. sect. Stenolaema is now known as A. sect. Adenanthos, and all specific epithets now have masculine gender; for example, the species that Bentham referred to as Adenanthos barbigera is now named Adenanthos barbiger.

== See also ==
- Nelson's taxonomic arrangement of Adenanthos
