= Stick-in-the-jug =

Stick-in-the-jug may refer to

- Adenanthos, a plant genus
- More particularly, Adenanthos obovatus
