= Jugflower =

Jugflower may refer to:

- Adenanthos, a plant genus
- In particular, Adenanthos obovatus
