= Nelson's taxonomic arrangement of Adenanthos =

First modern arrangement of the plant genus

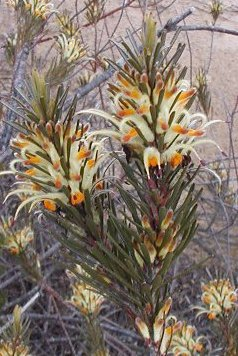
A. detmoldii

Ernest Charles Nelson's taxonomic arrangement of Adenanthos was the first modern-day arrangement of that plant genus. First published in his 1978 Brunonia article "A taxonomic revision of the genus Adenanthos (Proteaceae)", it superseded the arrangement of George Bentham, which had stood for over a hundred years. It was updated by Nelson in his 1995 treatment for the Flora of Australia series of monographs.

== Background ==
Adenanthos is a genus of around 30 species in the plant family Proteaceae. Endemic to southern Australia, they are evergreen woody shrubs with solitary flowers that are pollinated by birds and, if fertilised, develop into achenes. They are not much cultivated. Common names of species often include one of the terms woollybush, jugflower and stick-in-the-jug.

The first known botanical collection of Adenanthos was made by Archibald Menzies during the September 1791 visit of the Vancouver Expedition to King George Sound on the south coast of Western Australia. However this did not lead to publication of the genus. Jacques Labillardière collected specimens of A. cuneatus from Esperance Bay the following year, and in 1803 Jean Baptiste Leschenault de la Tour collected the same two species as Menzies had 12 years earlier. Labillardière published the genus in 1805, in his Novae Hollandiae Plantarum Specimen, based on the specimens collected by himself and Leschenault. The genus was given the name Adenanthos from the Greek αδην (aden-, "gland") and ανθοσz (-anthos, "flower"), in reference to the prominent nectaries.

By 1870, 13 species had been published. That year, Bentham published a fourteenth species and the first infrageneric arrangement, dividing the genus into two taxonomic sections, A. sect. Eurylaema and A. sect. Stenolaema, based on the shape of the perianth tube: members of A. sect. Eurylaema have perianth tubes that are curved and swollen above the middle, whereas members of A. sect. Stenolaena have perianth tubes that are straight and unswollen. This arrangement stood for over a hundred years, by which time a number of new species had been discovered, rendering Bentham's treatment "very inadequate and incomplete".

== Nelson's arrangement ==
Nelson's arrangement of Adenanthos was first published in his article "A taxonomic revision of the genus Adenanthos (Proteaceae)", published in Brunonia in 1978. Eight new species and 4 new subspecies were published, bringing the number of species up to 32. In naming them, Nelson follows Labillardière in treating Adenanthos as having feminine gender, despite an ICBN recommendation (not rule) that names ending in -anthos be treated as masculine. Bentham's two sections are retained, but several additional diagnostic characteristics are given for them; and, in accordance with modern rules of botanical nomenclature, A. sect. Stenolaema is renamed to the autonym A. sect. Adenanthos. This Nelson further divides into two subsections, A. subsect. Anaclastos and A. subsect. Adenanthos. Detailed descriptions of each are given, but Nelson recommends perianth length as the most convenient key for distinguishing between them.

Nelson's subsections were discarded by him in his 1995 treatment of Adenanthos for the Flora of Australia series of monographs. He retained the two sections, and listed 40 species. Masculine names were used in accordance with a 1994 ICBN ruling. The full arrangement is as follows:

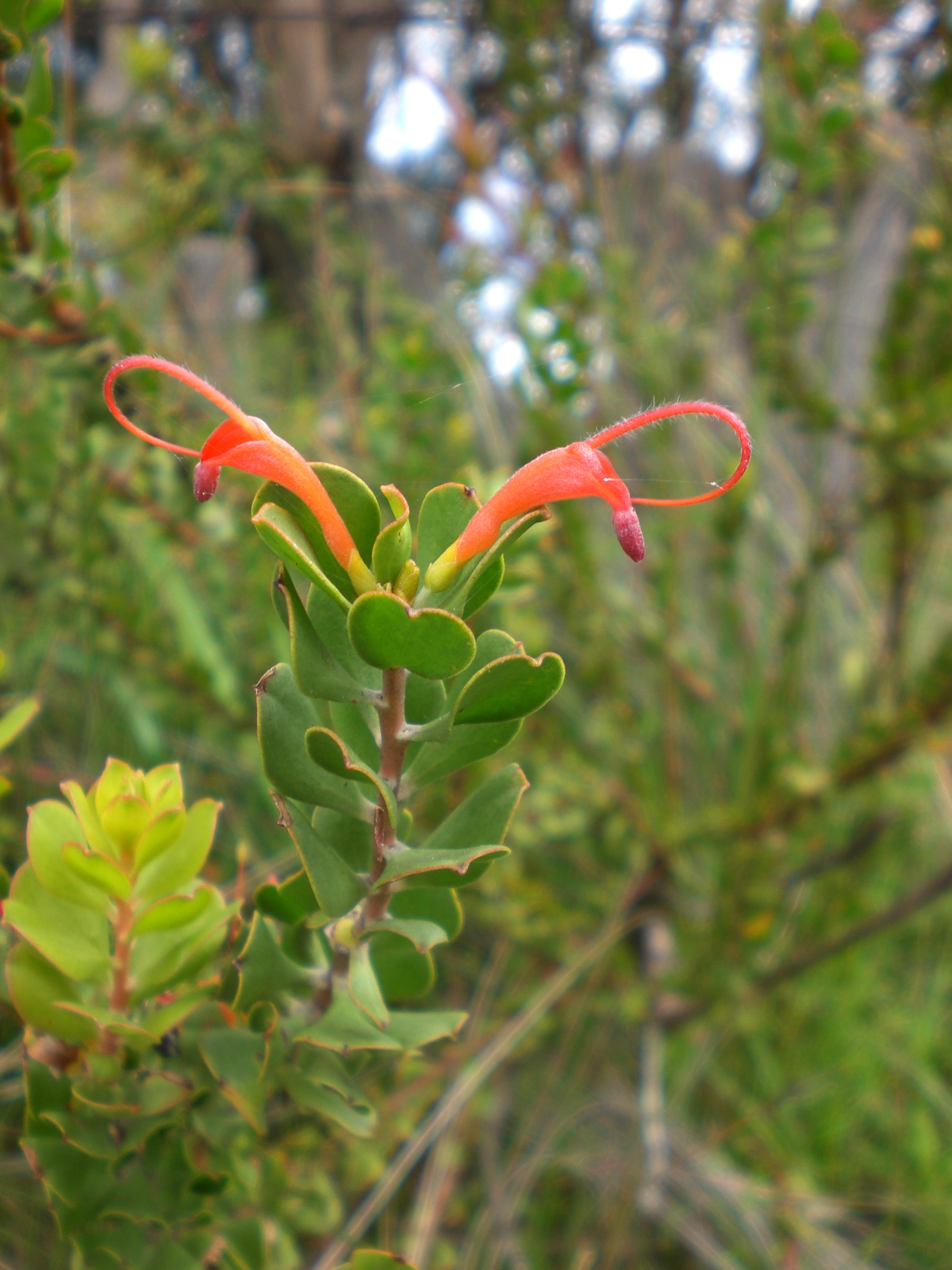
A. obovatus

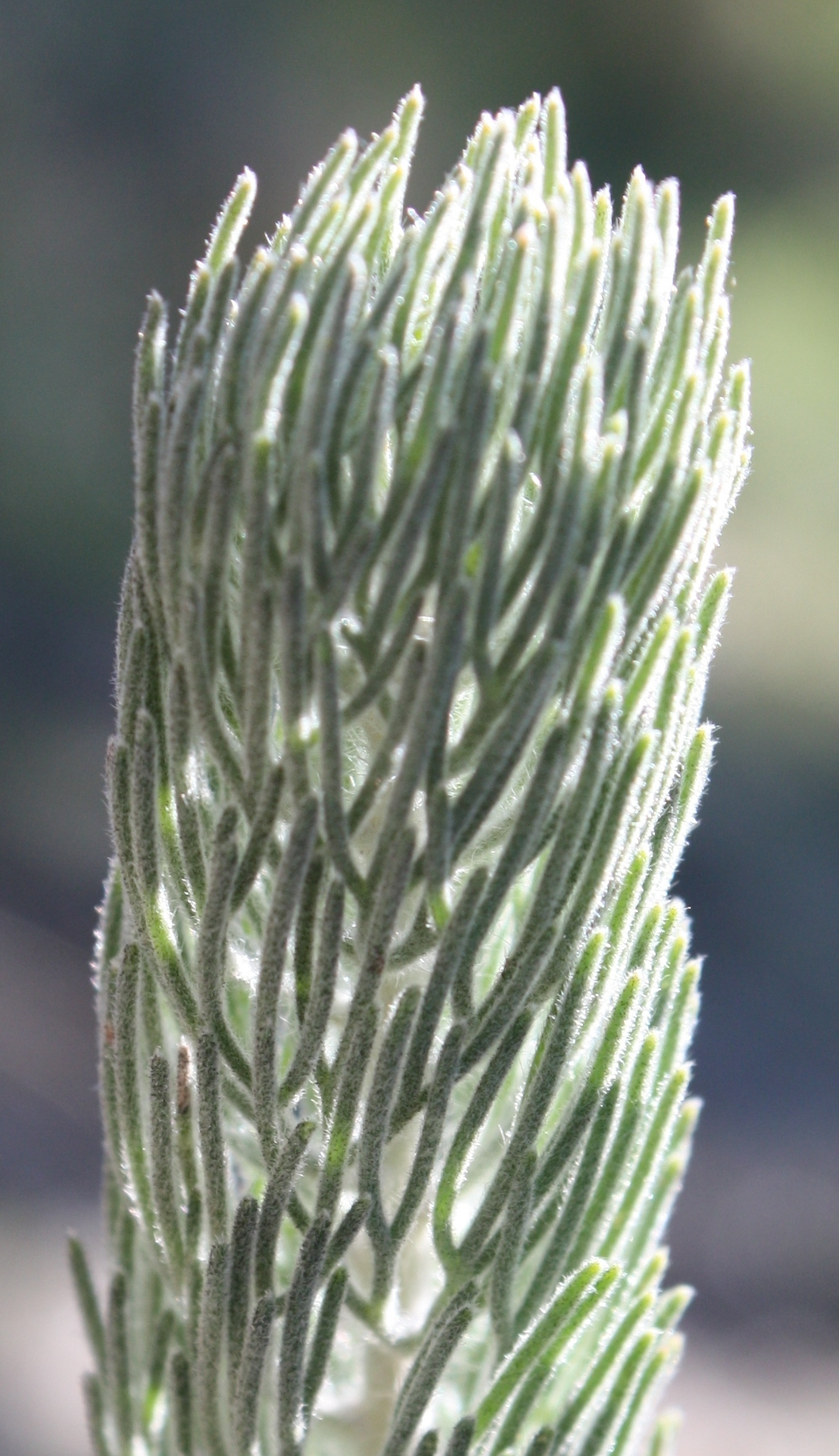
Closeup of A. cygnorum foliage

Adenanthos

A. sect. Eurylaema

A. detmoldii
A. barbiger
A. obovatus
A. × pamela

A. sect. Adenanthos

A. drummondii
A. dobagii
A. apiculatus
A. linearis
A. pungens

A. pungens subsp. pungens
A. pungens subsp. effusus

A. gracilipes
A. venosus
A. dobsonii
A. glabrescens

A. glabrescens subsp. glabrescens
A. glabrescens subsp. exasperatus

A. ellipticus
A. cuneatus
A. stictus
A. ileticos
A. forrestii
A. eyrei
A. cacomorphus
A. flavidiflorus
A. argyreus
A. macropodianus
A. terminalis
A. sericeus

A. sericeus subsp. sericeus
A. sericeus subsp. sphalma

A. × cunninghamii
A. oreophilus
A. cygnorum

A. cygnorum subsp. cygnorum
A. cygnorum subsp. chamaephyton

A. meisneri
A. velutinus
A. filifolius
A. labillardierei
A. acanthophyllus

== See also ==
- Bentham's taxonomic arrangement of Adenanthos
