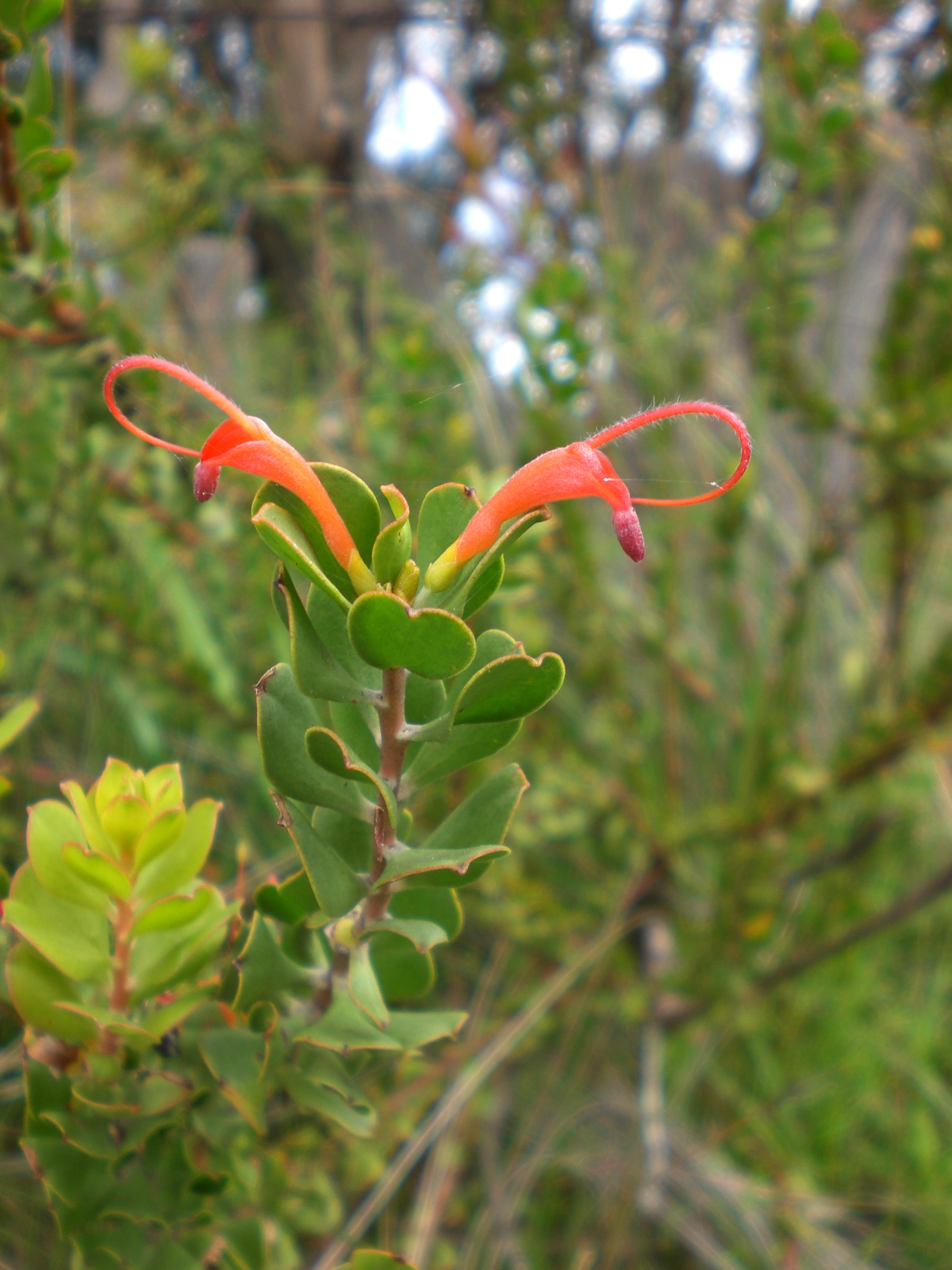
- Adenanthos obovatus, the type species of A. sect. Eurylaema

Scientific classification
- Kingdom: Plantae
- Clade: Tracheophytes
- Clade: Angiosperms
- Clade: Eudicots
- Order: Proteales
- Family: Proteaceae
- Genus: Adenanthos
- Section: Adenanthos sect. Eurylaema; Benth.

Species
- A. detmoldii A. barbiger A. obovatus A. × pamela

= Adenanthos sect. Eurylaema =

Taxonomic section of the flowering plant genus Adenanthos (Proteaceae)

Adenanthos sect. Eurylaema is a taxonomic section of the flowering plant genus Adenanthos (Proteaceae). It comprises four species, all of which are endemic to southwest Western Australia.

== Description ==
The section is characterised by flowers in which the stamen on the back of the style is sterile, and the style end is broad and flattened.

== Taxonomy ==
The section was first described and published by George Bentham in the 1870 fifth volume of his landmark work Flora Australiensis. Bentham listed several diagnostic characters for the species including the bent and dilated perianth-tube; the sterility of one of the four anthers; the broad, flattened style-end; flat, entire leaves; and axillary flowers. He did not give an etymology for the epithet Eurylaema, but Ernest Charles Nelson states that it comes from eurys ("broad") and laemos ("neck"), referring to the dilated perianth-tube. Bentham also did not designate a type species for the section; Nelson has since defined A. obovatus to be its lectotype.

When published by Bentham in 1870, A. sect. Eurylaema comprised only two species, A. barbigera (now A. barbiger) and A. obovata (now A. obovatus). Four years later, Ferdinand von Mueller published A. detmoldii, referring it to this section.

In 1978, Nelson published a comprehensive taxonomic revision of Adenanthos. He retained A. sect. Eurylaema, making no change to its circumscription, but discarded many of Bentham's diagnostic characters, retaining only the sterile anther and the shape of the style-end. The following year, Nelson formally described and named A. × pamela, a naturally occurring hybrid of A. detmoldii and A. obovatus. Despite both parents belonging to this section, initially he did not assign the hybrid to it; he did so, however, in his 1995 treatment of Adenanthos for the Flora of Australia series of monographs.

The placement and circumscription of A. sect. Eurylaema in Nelson's arrangement of Adenanthos may be summarised as follows:

Adenanthos

A. sect. Eurylaema

A. detmoldii
A. barbiger
A. obovatus
A. × pamela

A. sect. Adenanthos (29 species, 8 subspecies)

== Distribution and habitat ==
All four species in A. sect. Eurylaema are endemic to southwest Western Australia.
