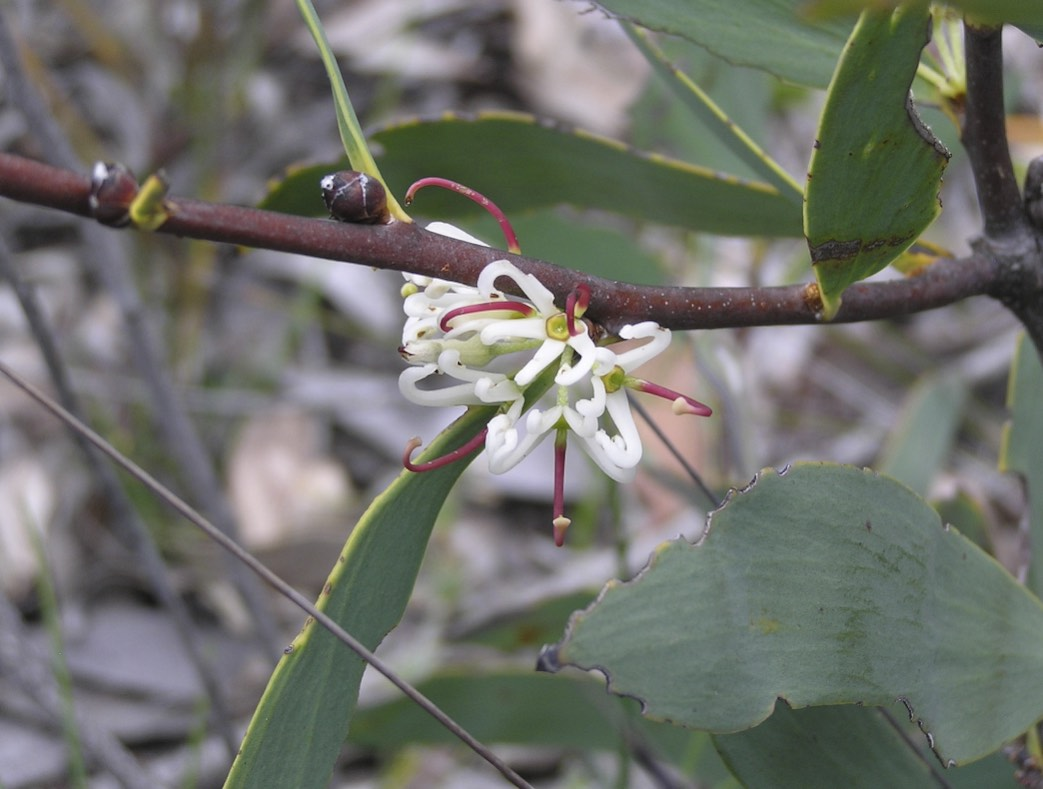
- Hakea cyclocarpa growing near Mundaring Weir

Scientific classification
- Kingdom: Plantae
- Clade: Embryophytes
- Clade: Tracheophytes
- Clade: Angiosperms
- Clade: Eudicots
- Order: Proteales
- Family: Proteaceae
- Genus: Hakea
- Species: H. cyclocarpa

Binomial name
- Hakea cyclocarpa Lindl.
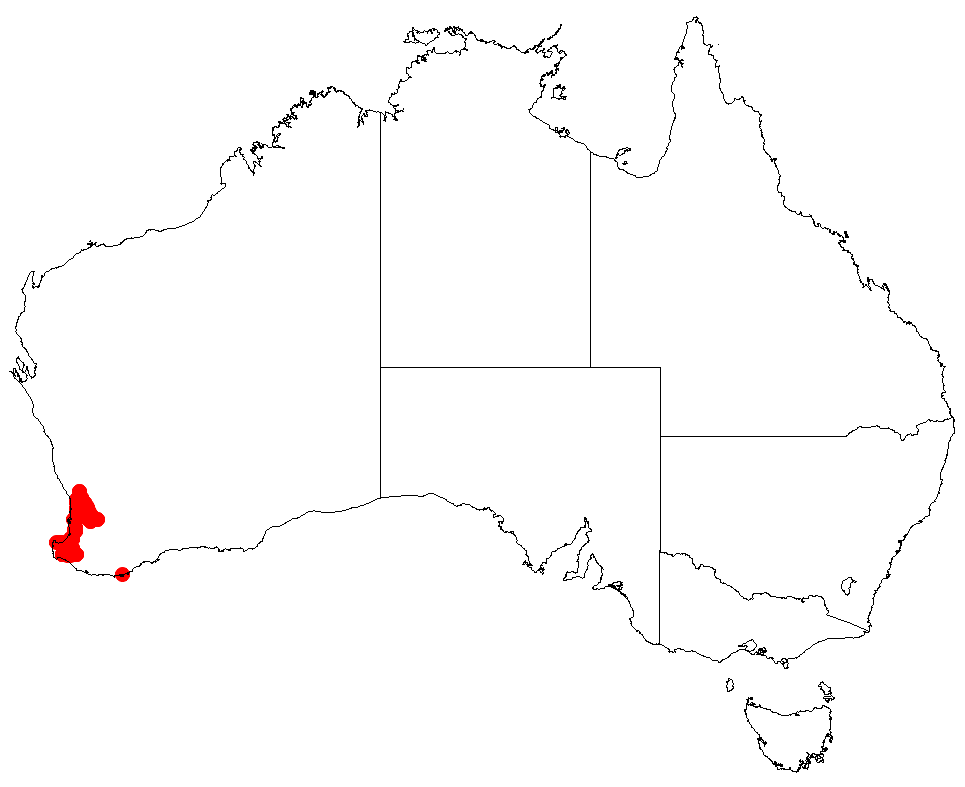
- Occurrence data from AVH

= Hakea cyclocarpa =

Ramshorn hakea

Species of shrub native to Australia

Hakea cyclocarpa, commonly known as the ram's horn, wild bean or curved-fruit hakea is a shrub in the family Proteaceae. A strongly scented species with large creamy-white flowers with a red style and interesting fruit. Native to an area along the west coast and south west regions of Western Australia.

== Description ==
Hakea cyclocarpa is an upright spindly lignotuberous shrub with smooth grey bark, growing to 1 to 2.5 metres (3.3 to 8.2 ft) tall. Smaller branches and new leaves are covered with soft matted white or rusty coloured hairs. The inflorescence consists of 10-18 large white or creamy-white flowers with a red-brown styles 13–14 mm (0.51–0.55 in) long on an obscure stem. The overlapping bracts are 8–8.5 mm (0.31–0.33 in) long. The pedicels are 6–9 mm (0.24–0.35 in) long and densely covered with short, soft, matted white hairs, some flattened extending onto the lower part of the flower. The perianth is 7.5–10 mm (0.30–0.39 in) long. It blooms from August to October. Leaves are up to 17 cm (6.7 in) long by 4 cm (1.6 in) wide. Leaves are narrowly egg-shaped widest in the middle, either rounded or a blunt point at the apex. The S-shaped fruit are 3.5–4 cm (1–2 in) long and 1.8–2.2 cm (0.71–0.87 in) wide, smooth to slightly rough ending in a small pointed beak.

== Taxonomy and naming ==
Hakea cyclocarpa was collected by James Drummond in 1839. The species was first formally described by English botanist John Lindley in 1840 and published in A Sketch of the Vegetation of the Swan River Colony. The specific epithet (cyclocarpa) is derived from the Ancient Greek words kyklos meaning "circle", and karpos for "fruit", referring to the almost circular form of the fruit.

== Distribution and habitat ==
Hakea cyclocarpa grows from the Darling Range near Perth and south to the jarrah forests to Augusta. An uncommon species growing on granite, laterite, loam, clay, sand and gravelly soils in heath and forests. An ornamental shrub that is drought and frost tolerant, requiring semi-shade and a well-drained site.

== Conservation status ==
Presently considered "not threatened" by the Western Australian Government, Department of Parks and Wildlife.
