= Proshermacha subarmata =

Scientific classification
- Kingdom: Animalia
- Phylum: Arthropoda
- Subphylum: Chelicerata
- Class: Arachnida
- Order: Araneae
- Infraorder: Mygalomorphae
- Family: Anamidae
- Genus: Proshermacha
- Species: P. subarmata

Binomial name
- Proshermacha subarmata Simon, 1908

Species of spider

Proshermacha subarmata is a species of mygalomorph spider in the Anamidae family. It is endemic to Australia. It was described in 1908 by French arachnologist Eugène Simon.

== Distribution and habitat ==
The species occurs in the south-west of Western Australia in jarrah forest habitats. The type locality is Harvey.
