= Acanthocephalus =

Acanthocephalus may refer to:

- Acanthocephalus (worm), a genus of parasitic worms
- Acanthocephalus (plant), a genus of flowering plants in the family Asteraceae
