= Proshermacha intricata =

Scientific classification
- Kingdom: Animalia
- Phylum: Arthropoda
- Subphylum: Chelicerata
- Class: Arachnida
- Order: Araneae
- Infraorder: Mygalomorphae
- Family: Anamidae
- Genus: Proshermacha
- Species: P. intricata

Binomial name
- Proshermacha intricata (Rainbow & Pulleine, 1918)

Synonyms
- Aname intricata Rainbow & Pulleine, 1918

Species of spider

Proshermacha intricata is a species of mygalomorph spider in the Anamidae family. It is endemic to Australia. It was described in 1918 by Australian arachnologists William Joseph Rainbow and Robert Henry Pulleine.

== Distribution and habitat ==
The species occurs in the South West region of Western Australia in jarrah forest habitats. The type locality is Nannup.
