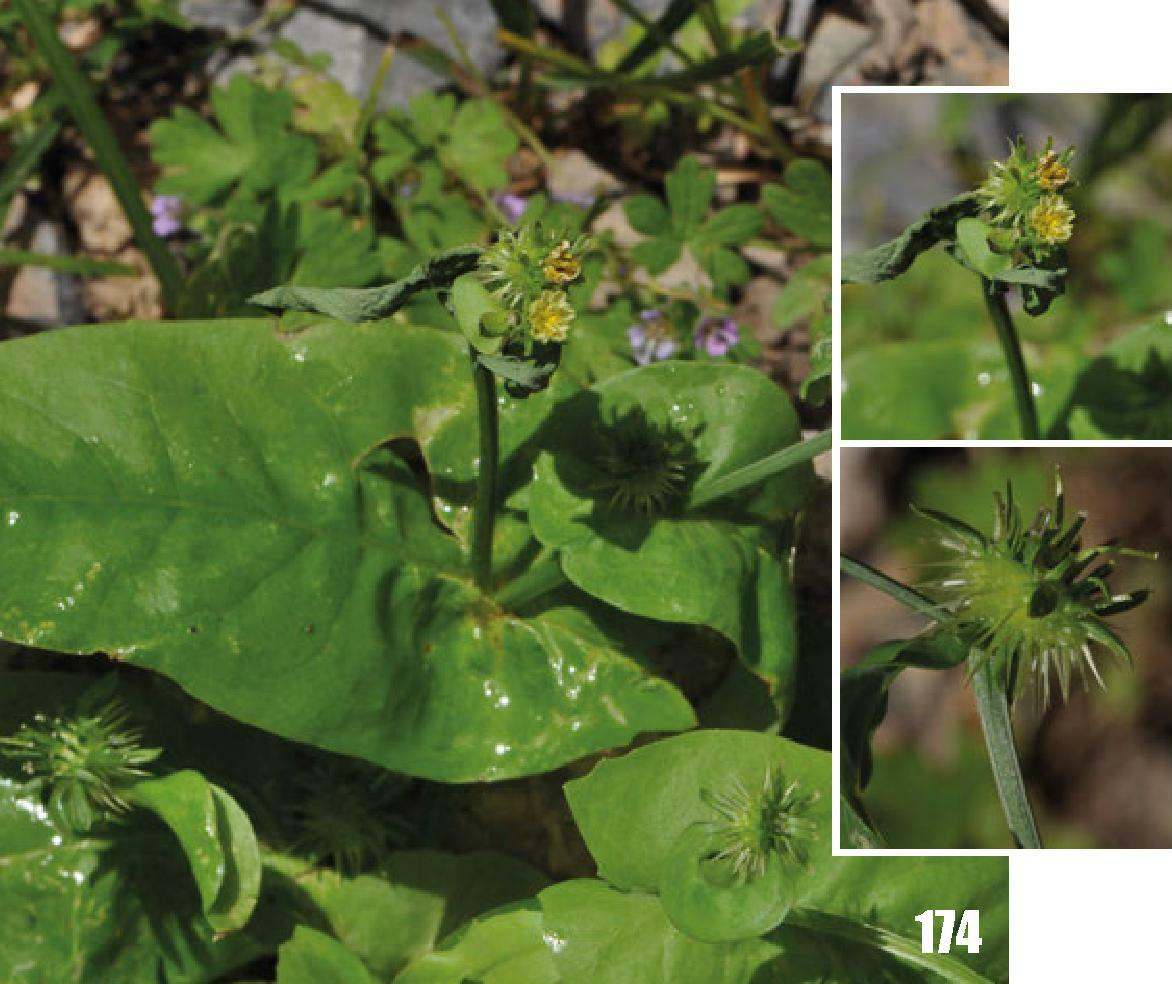

Scientific classification
- Kingdom: Plantae
- Clade: Tracheophytes
- Clade: Angiosperms
- Clade: Eudicots
- Clade: Asterids
- Order: Asterales
- Family: Asteraceae
- Genus: Acanthocephalus
- Species: A. amplexifolius

Binomial name
- Acanthocephalus amplexifolius Kar. & Kir.

Synonyms
- Harpachaena amplexifolia Bunge; Harpocarpus amplexifolius Endl. ex Walp.

= Acanthocephalus amplexifolius =

Species of plant

Acanthocephalus amplexifolius is a species of plant in the family Asteraceae and is found in Asia specifically Afghanistan, Kazakhstan, Kyrgyzstan, Tadzhikistan, Turkmenistan and Uzbekistan.
