= Proshermacha =

Scientific classification
- Kingdom: Animalia
- Phylum: Arthropoda
- Subphylum: Chelicerata
- Class: Arachnida
- Order: Araneae
- Infraorder: Mygalomorphae
- Family: Anamidae
- Genus: Proshermacha; Simon, 1908

Type species
- P. subarmata Simon, 1908

Species
- 14, see text

Genus of spiders

Proshermacha is a genus of mygalomorph spiders in the family Anamidae. It is endemic to Australia, and was first described by Eugène Simon in 1908.

== Species ==
As of October 2026 it contains 14 species:

- Proshermacha armigera (Rainbow & Pulleine, 1918) — Western Australia
- Proshermacha coenosa (Rainbow & Pulleine, 1918) — South Australia
- Proshermacha credo Wilson, Rix & Harvey, 2023 — Western Australia
- Proshermacha cuspidata (Main, 1954) — Western Australia
- Proshermacha intricata (Rainbow & Pulleine, 1918) — Western Australia
- Proshermacha katana Sagastume-Espinoza, Wilson & Harvey, 2025 — Western Australia
- Proshermacha maculata (Rainbow & Pulleine, 1918) — Western Australia
- Proshermacha rapier Sagastume-Espinoza, Wilson & Harvey, 2025 — Western Australia
- Proshermacha robertblosfeldsi Harvey, Wilson & Rix, 2023 — Western Australia
- Proshermacha scimitar Sagastume-Espinoza, Wilson & Harvey, 2025 — Western Australia
- Proshermacha telaporta Harvey, Wilson & Rix, 2023 — Western Australia
- Proshermacha tepperi (Hogg, 1902) — South Australia
- Proshermacha villosa (Rainbow & Pulleine, 1918) — Western Australia
- Proshermacha wilga Leenders, Beach & Harvey, 2023 — Western Australia
