= Proshermacha tepperi =

Scientific classification
- Kingdom: Animalia
- Phylum: Arthropoda
- Subphylum: Chelicerata
- Class: Arachnida
- Order: Araneae
- Infraorder: Mygalomorphae
- Family: Anamidae
- Genus: Proshermacha
- Species: P. tepperi

Binomial name
- Proshermacha tepperi (Hogg, 1901)

Synonyms
- Chenistonia tepperi Hogg, 1901

Species of spider

Proshermacha tepperi, also known as the Lidless Banksia Trapdoor Spider, is a species of mygalomorph spider in the Anamidae family. It is endemic to Australia. It was described in 1901 by British arachnologist Henry Roughton Hogg.

== Description ==
The body length is about 30 mm.

== Distribution and habitat ==
The species occurs in South Australia and Western Australia in low woodland, open forest, heathland and scrub with sandy or loamy soils. The type locality is Ardrossan on the Yorke Peninsula.

== Behaviour ==
The spiders are fossorial, terrestrial predators that build and shelter in deep, sinuous, lidless burrows.
