= Proshermacha maculata =

Scientific classification
- Kingdom: Animalia
- Phylum: Arthropoda
- Subphylum: Chelicerata
- Class: Arachnida
- Order: Araneae
- Infraorder: Mygalomorphae
- Family: Anamidae
- Genus: Proshermacha
- Species: P. maculata

Binomial name
- Proshermacha maculata (Rainbow & Pulleine, 1918)

Synonyms
- Aname maculata Rainbow & Pulleine 1918

Species of spider

Proshermacha maculata is a species of mygalomorph spider in the Anamidae family. It is endemic to Australia. It was described in 1918 by Australian arachnologists William Joseph Rainbow and Robert Henry Pulleine.

== Distribution and habitat ==
The species occurs in Western Australia, on the Darling Scarp and the Swan Coastal Plain near the city of Perth, in closed heath and low open forest habitats. The type locality is Jarrahdale.

== Behaviour and ecology ==
The spiders are fossorial, terrestrial predators. They inhabit gullies on the scarp and swamp fringes on the coastal plain.
