= Proshermacha villosa =

Scientific classification
- Kingdom: Animalia
- Phylum: Arthropoda
- Subphylum: Chelicerata
- Class: Arachnida
- Order: Araneae
- Infraorder: Mygalomorphae
- Family: Anamidae
- Genus: Proshermacha
- Species: P. villosa

Binomial name
- Proshermacha villosa (Rainbow & Pulleine, 1918)

Synonyms
- Chenistonia villosa Rainbow & Pulleine, 1918

Species of spider

Proshermacha villosa is a species of mygalomorph spider in the Anamidae family. It is endemic to Australia. It was described in 1918 by Australian arachnologists William Joseph Rainbow and Robert Henry Pulleine.

== Distribution and habitat ==
The species occurs in south-west Western Australia, in tall open forest. The type locality is Carlotta Brook, Nannup.

== Behaviour and ecology ==
The spiders are arboreal or fossorial, terrestrial predators. They inhabit karri forest and construct shallow burrows or silk tubes for shelter, sometimes beneath bark.
