= William Detmold =

German-born Australian bookbinder (1828–1884)

William Detmold (17 October 1828 - 4 August 1884) was a German-born Australian bookbinder, printer and stationer.

Born in Hanover in Germany, he migrated to the United States in 1846. There he was believed to have received training in bookbinding in New York City. He moved to Australia in 1852 and established a business in 1854, based in Swanston Street and later Collins Street. He became well known for his quality binding, with customers including the University of Melbourne and the Melbourne Public Library. Detmold won awards for binding at the Exposition Universelle in Paris in 1878 and the Melbourne International Exhibition in 1880. He was a friend of Victoria's government botanist Ferdinand von Mueller, and like Mueller, a life member of the Royal Society of Victoria and German-born. In 1874 Mueller named the plant species Adenanthos detmoldii in his honour.
