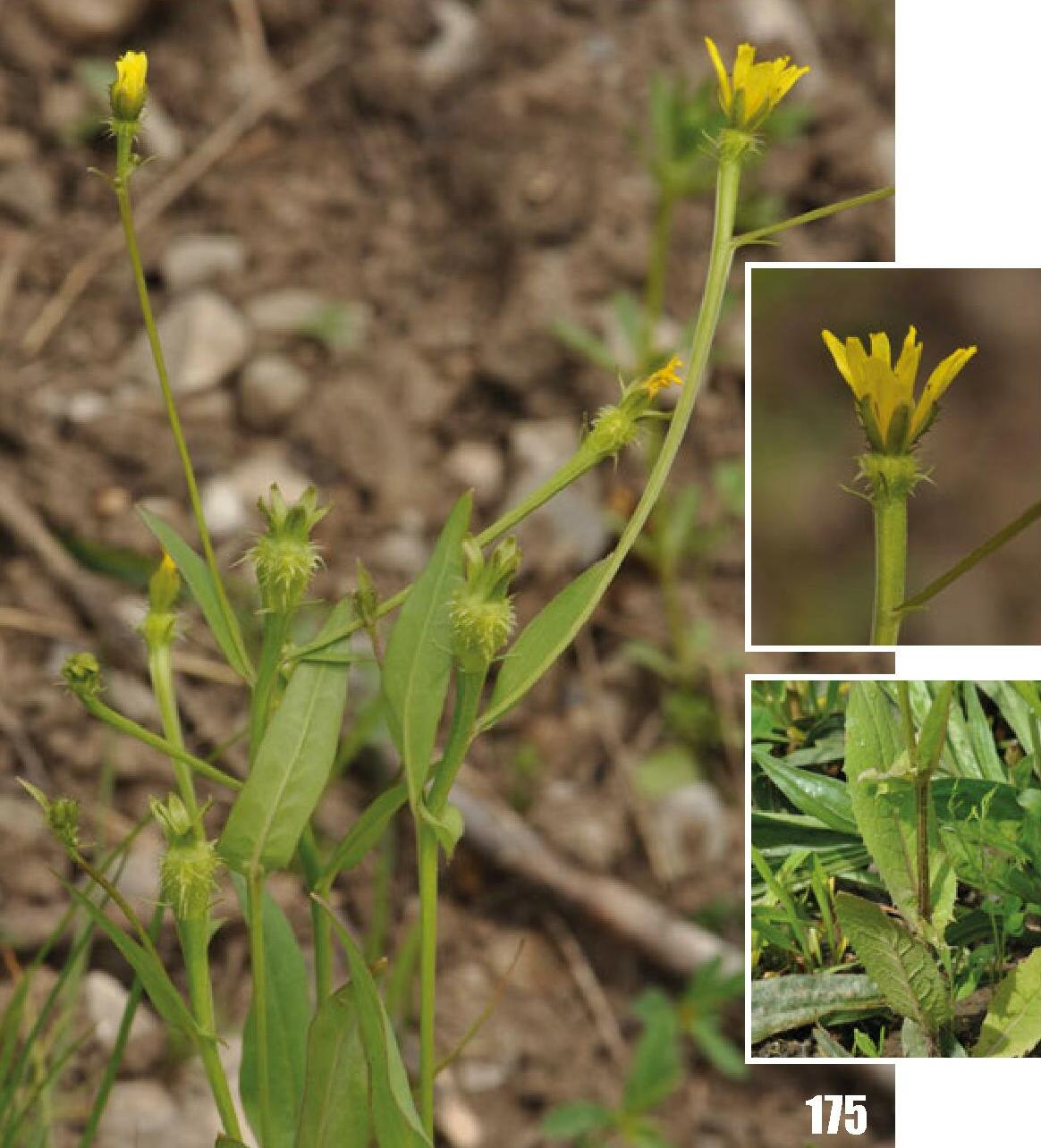

Scientific classification
- Kingdom: Plantae
- Clade: Tracheophytes
- Clade: Angiosperms
- Clade: Eudicots
- Clade: Asterids
- Order: Asterales
- Family: Asteraceae
- Genus: Acanthocephalus
- Species: A. benthamianus

Binomial name
- Acanthocephalus benthamianus Regel

= Acanthocephalus benthamianus =

Species of plant

Acanthocephalus benthamianus is a species of plant in the family Asteraceae and is found in Asia specifically Afghanistan, Iran, Kazakhstan, Kyrgyzstan, Pakistan, Tajikistan, Turkmenistan and Uzbekistan.
