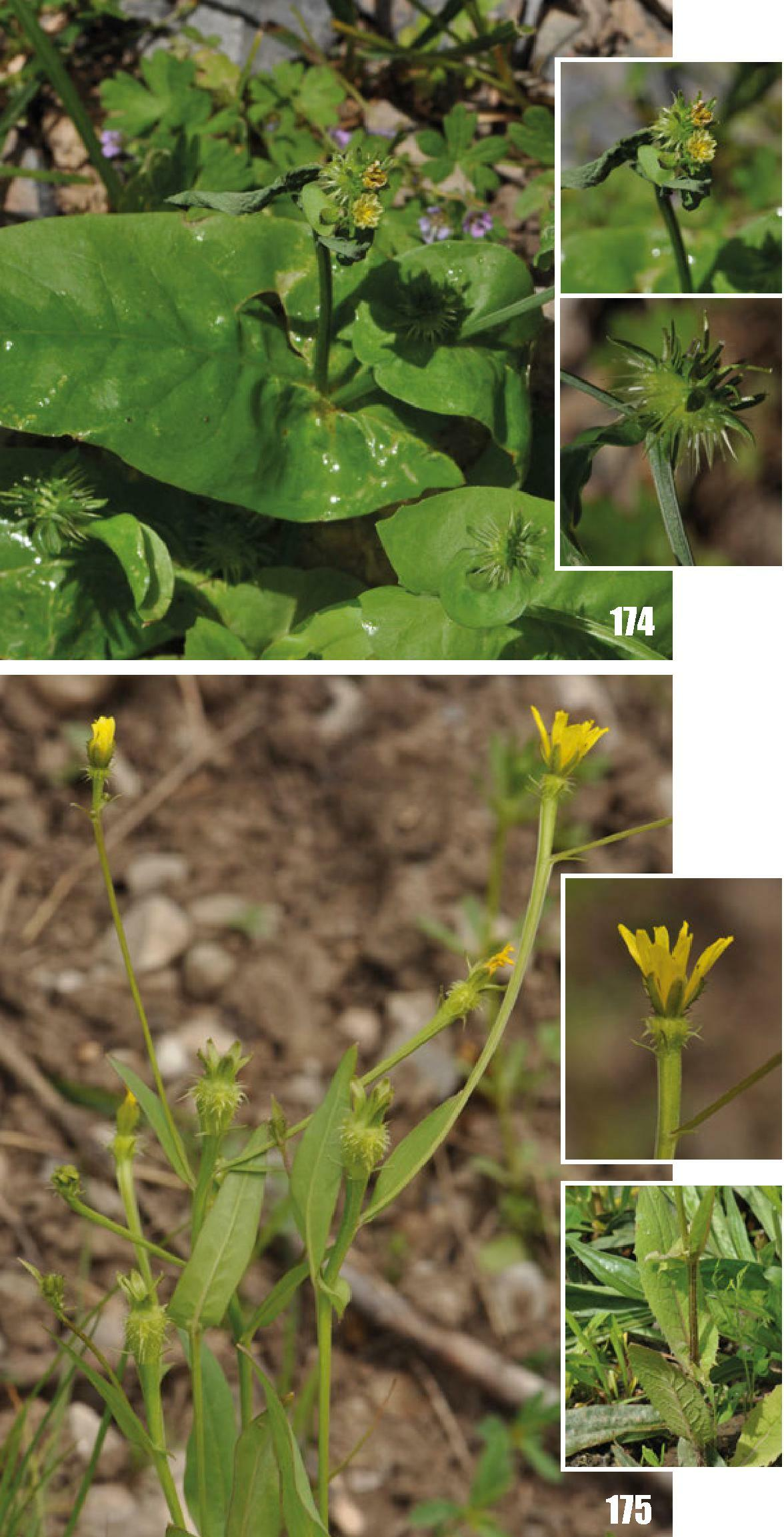
- A. amplexifolius and A. benthamianus

Scientific classification
- Kingdom: Plantae
- Clade: Tracheophytes
- Clade: Angiosperms
- Clade: Eudicots
- Clade: Asterids
- Order: Asterales
- Family: Asteraceae
- Subfamily: Cichorioideae
- Tribe: Cichorieae
- Subtribe: Crepidinae
- Genus: Acanthocephalus; Kar. & Kir.

Synonyms
- Harpachaena Bunge; Harpocarpus Endl.

= Acanthocephalus (plant) =

Genus of flowering plants

Acanthocephalus is a genus of plants in the family Asteraceae, described as a genus in 1842.

The genus is native to Central Asia.

Species

- Acanthocephalus amplexifolius Kar. & Kir. - Altai
- Acanthocephalus benthamianus Regel & Schmalh. - Uzbekistan

== Etymology ==
The genus name is a contraction of the Greek ἄκανθα (akantha) meaning "thorn" or "prickle", and κεφαλή (kephale), the word for "head".

== Bibliography ==
- Bunge, Alexander Andrejewitsch von (1845). Delectus Seminum quae in horto botanico universitatis caesareae Dorpatensis collecta.
- Endlicher, Stephan Friedrich Ladislaus (1843). Genera plantarum secundum ordines naturales disposita (Endlicher) (in Latin). Vol. Supplement 3. Vindobonae: Apud F. Beck.
- Karelin, Grigorij Silyč; Kirilov, Ivan Petrovich (1842). Bulletin de la Société Imperiale des Naturalistes de Moscou. Vol. 15. Moscou: Société impériale des naturalistes de Moscou.
