= George Bentham =

English botanist (1800–1884)

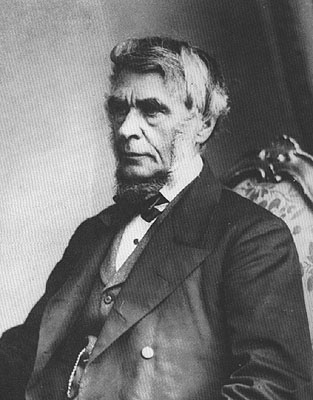
- Born: 22 September 1800; Stoke Damerel, Plymouth, England
- Died: 10 September 1884 (aged 83); London, England
- Spouse: Sarah Jones
- Awards: Royal Medal of the Royal Society in 1859; Clarke Medal of the Royal Society of New South Wales in 1879
- Scientific career
- Fields: Botany
- Workplaces: Royal Botanic Gardens, Kew
- Author abbrev. (botany): Benth.

George Bentham CMG FRS FLS (22 September 1800 – 10 September 1884) was an English botanist, described by the weed botanist Duane Isely as "the premier systematic botanist of the nineteenth century". Born into a distinguished family, he initially studied law, but had a fascination with botany from an early age, which he soon pursued, becoming president of the Linnaean Society in 1861, and a fellow of the Royal Society in 1862. He was the author of a number of important botanical works, particularly flora. He is best known for his taxonomic classification of plants in collaboration with Joseph Dalton Hooker, his Genera Plantarum (1862–1883). He died in London in 1884.

== Life ==
Bentham was born in Stoke, Plymouth, on 22 September 1800. His father, Sir Samuel Bentham, a naval architect, was the only brother of Jeremy Bentham to survive into adulthood. His mother, Mary Sophia Bentham, was a botanist and author. (Note: "For example, the career of George Bentham, writer on botany and president of the Linnean Society from 1861 to 1874, 'seems to have been largely due to his mother,' Lady Mary Bentham (c. 1765-1858), who had a herbarium and was said to have been a very good botanist.") Bentham had no formal education but had a remarkable linguistic aptitude. By the age of seven, he could speak French, German and Russian, and he learned Swedish during a short residence in Sweden while still a child. The family made a long tour through France, staying two years at Montauban, where Bentham studied Hebrew and mathematics in the Protestant Theological School. They eventually settled near Montpellier where Sir Samuel bought a large estate.

While studying at Angoulême, Bentham came across a copy of A. P. de Candolle's Flore française, and became interested in the analytical tables for identifying plants. He immediately tested them on the first plant he saw. The result was successful and he applied it to every plant he came across. In London in 1823, he met English botanists. His uncle pushed him to study law at Lincoln's Inn. He was called to the bar and in 1832 held his first and only legal brief. However, his interest in botany never flagged and he became secretary of the Horticultural Society of London from 1829 to 1840.

In 1832, he inherited the property of his uncle, Jeremy Bentham. Having inherited his father's estate the previous year, he was now sufficiently well off to do whatever he wanted, which was botany, jurisprudence and logic.

Bentham married Sarah Jones (1798–1881), daughter of Sir Harford Jones Brydges, on 11 April 1833; they did not have children.

Bentham died at his London home on 10 September 1884, aged 83. He was interred in Brompton Cemetery.

== Career ==
=== Views on evolution ===
Bentham's life spanned the Darwinian revolution, and his young colleague Joseph Dalton Hooker was Darwin's closest friend and one of the first to accept Darwin's ideas. Until then, Bentham unquestioningly believed that species were fixed. In 1874 he wrote that "Fifteen years have sufficed to establish a theory of evolution by natural selection". Bentham's conversion to the new line of thought was complete, and included a change from typology in taxonomy to an appreciation that "We cannot form an idea of a species from a single individual, nor of a genus from a single one of its species. We can no more set up a typical species than a typical individual."

=== Honours and awards ===
Bentham was awarded the Royal Medal of the Royal Society in 1859 and elected a Fellow in 1862. He served as president of the Linnean Society of London from 1861 to 1874. He was elected a Foreign Honorary Member of the American Academy of Arts and Sciences in 1866. He was appointed CMG (Companion of St Michael & St George) in 1878. His foreign awards included the Clarke Medal of the Royal Society of New South Wales in 1879.

== Works ==
Bentham's first publication was his Catalogue des plantes indigènes des Pyrénées et du Bas Languedoc (Paris 1826), the result of a careful exploration of the Pyrenees in company with G. A. Walker Arnott (1799–1868), afterwards professor of botany in the University of Glasgow. In the catalogue Bentham adopted the principle from which he never deviated, of citing nothing at second-hand. This was followed by articles on various legal subjects: on codification, in which he disagreed with his uncle, on the laws affecting larceny and on the law of real property. But the most remarkable production of this period was the Outline of a New System of Logic: With a Critical Examination of Dr. Whately's Elements of Logic (1827). In this the principle of the quantification of the predicate was first explicitly stated. This Stanley Jevons declared to be undoubtedly the most fruitful discovery made in abstract logical science since the time of Aristotle. Before sixty copies had been sold the publisher became bankrupt and the stock went for wastepaper. The book passed into oblivion, and it was not until 1873 that Bentham's claims to priority were finally vindicated against those of Sir William Hamilton by Herbert Spencer.

In 1836 he published his Labiatarum genera et species. In preparing this work he visited, between 1830 and 1834, every European herbarium, several more than once. The following winter was passed in Vienna, where he produced his Commentationes de Leguminosarum generibus, published in the annals of the Vienna Museum. In 1842 he moved to Pontrilas in Herefordshire. His chief occupation for the next few years was his contributions to the Prodromus Systematis Naturalis Regni Vegetabilis, which was being carried on by his friend, A. P. de Candolle. In all these dealt with some 4,730 species.

In 1844, he provided the botanical descriptions for The Botany of the Voyage of H.M.S. Sulphur. The editor, Richard Brinsley Hinds, had been surgeon on HMS Sulphur 1835-41 while she explored the Pacific coast of the Americas.

In 1854 he found the maintenance of a herbarium and library too expensive. He, therefore, offered them to the government on the understanding that they should form the foundation of such necessary aids to research in the Royal Botanic Gardens, Kew. At the same time, he contemplated the abandonment of botanical work. However, he yielded to the persuasion of Sir William Jackson Hooker, John Lindley and other scientific friends. In 1855 he took up his residence in London, and worked at Kew for five days a week, with a brief summer holiday, from this time onwards until the end of his life.

In 1857, the government sanctioned a scheme for the preparation of a series of Floras or descriptions in the English language of the indigenous plants of British colonies and possessions. Bentham began with the Flora Hongkongensis in 1861, which was the first comprehensive work on any part of the little-known flora of China and Hong Kong, including Hong Kong croton. This was followed by the Flora Australiensis, in seven volumes (1863–1878), the first flora of any large continental area that had ever been finished. His greatest work was the Genera Plantarum, begun in 1862, and concluded in 1883 in collaboration with Joseph Dalton Hooker. His most famous work, however, was the Handbook of the British flora, begun in 1853 and first published in 1858. This was used by students for over a century, running into many editions. After his death, it was edited by Hooker, and was known simply as Bentham & Hooker. He is most famous for his extensive and excellent classification of plants, especially angiosperms, along with Hooker, forming the "Bentham & Hooker system", which was published in three volumes as Genera Plantarum between 1862 and 1883.

=== Selected publications ===
- "On the Distribution of the Monocotyledonous Orders into Primary Groups, more especially in reference to the Australian Flora, with notes on some points of Terminology". Journal of the Linnean Society of London, Botany. 15 (88): 490–520. February 1877. doi:10.1111/j.1095-8339.1877.tb00261.x. Zenodo: 1432977.
- Genera plantarum ad exemplaria imprimis in herbariis kewensibus servata definita (3 vols.). London: L Reeve & Co. 1862–1883.
- Outline of a New System of Logic: With a Critical Examination of Dr. Whately's "Elements of Logic. London: Hunt and Clarke. 1827. ISBN 9780598395641.
- The Botany of the Voyage of H.M.S. Sulphur. under Captain Ed. Belcher The Botanical descriptions by George Bentham: Text. Lords Commissioners of the Admiralty. 1846 – via Smith Elder and Co.

== Legacy ==
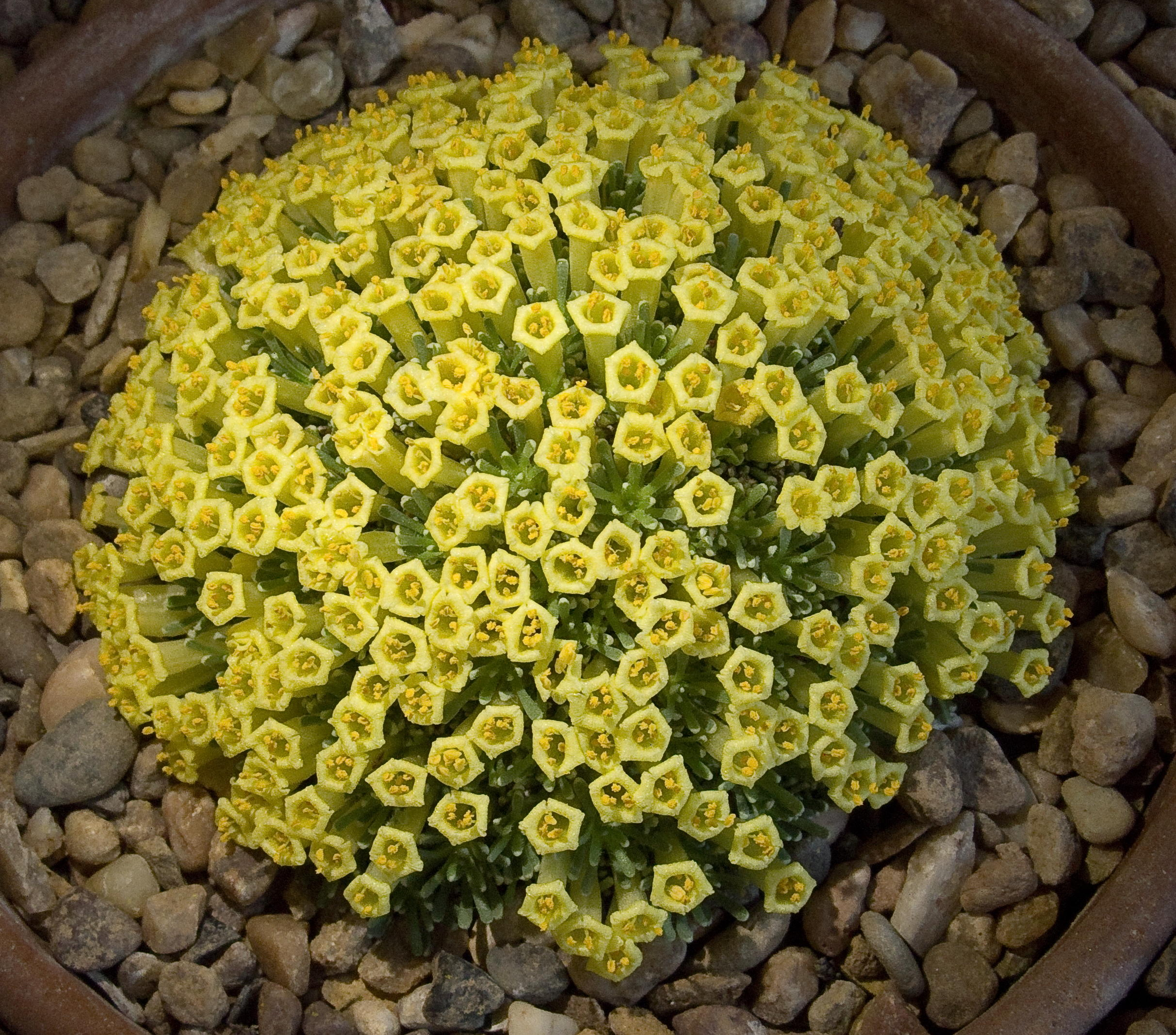
Benthamiella patagonica, one of several plants named in Bentham's honour

The following plants have been named in his honour:

=== Genera ===
- Benthamia A.Rich.
- Benthamiella Speg.

=== Species ===
- Acanthocephalus benthamianus Regel
- Andropogon benthamianus Steud.
- Gardenia benthamianus F.Muell.
- Croton benthamianus Müll.Arg.
- Distemonanthus benthamianus Baill.
- Garcinia benthamiana (Planch. & Triana) Pipoly
- Nicotiana benthamiana Domin
- Pinus ponderosa ssp. benthamiana Hartw.
- Thelymitra benthamiana Rchb.f.
- Verbascum sinaiticum

== See also ==
- Bentham & Hooker system – System of plant classification
- Bentham's taxonomic arrangement of Adenanthos – Genus in plant family Proteaceae
- Bentham's taxonomic arrangement of Banksia – 1870 arrangement of the Australian endemic plant genus Banksia
- Category:Taxa named by George Bentham

== Notes and references ==
=== Sources ===
- American Academy of Arts and Sciences (2006). "B". Book of Members: 1780-2005 (PDF). Cambridge, MA: American Academy of Arts and Sciences. OCLC 70224250. Archived from the original (PDF) on 23 November 2018.
- Amigo, Jean-Jacques (2017). "Bentham (George)". Nouveau Dictionnaire de biographies roussillonnaises (1789-2017) [New Dictionary of Roussillon biographies (1789-2017)] (in French). Vol. 3, Sciences de la Vie et de la Terre. Perpignan: Publications de l'olivier. ISBN 978-2-908866-50-6. OCLC 1012939774.
- Anon (1999). A Dictionary of Scientists. Oxford: University Press. ISBN 978-0-19-280086-2.
- Bettany, George Thomas (1885). "Bentham, George" . In Stephen, Leslie (ed.). Dictionary of National Biography. Vol. 4. London: Smith, Elder & Co.
- Burke, Bernard (1906). Burke, Ashworth Peter (ed.). A Genealogical and Heraldic History of The Landed Gentry of Great Britain (11th ed.). London: Harrison & sons. OCLC 1336190250.
- Cribb, Phillip (12 December 2010). "The orchid collections and illustrations of Consul Friedrich C. Lehmann". Lankesteriana. 10 (2–3). Biographies. doi:10.15517/lank.v10i2-3.18317. ISSN 2215-2067.
- "George Bentham". Botanical Gazette. 10 (1): 211–213. 1885. doi:10.1086/325816. ISSN 0006-8071. JSTOR 2994865.
- Green, Joseph Reynolds (1914). A History of Botany in the United Kingdom from the Earliest Times to the End of the 19th Century. London: J. M. Dent & sons.
- Isely, Duane (2002). One Hundred and One Botanists. Purdue University Press. ISBN 978-1-55753-283-1.
- "Obituary notices of fellows deceased". Proceedings of the Royal Society of London. 38 (235–238). 1885. doi:10.1098/rspl.1884.0053. ISSN 0370-1662.
- Plarr, Victor; Royal College of Surgeons of England (2006) [1930]. "Hinds, Richard Brinsley (1812 - 1847)". Plarr's Lives of the Fellows Online. [London, England]: Royal College of Surgeons of England, Library & Information Services. OCLC 646581474.
- Shteir, Ann B. (1984). "6. Linnaeus's Daughters: Women and British Botany". In Harris, Barbara J.; McNamara, Jo Ann (eds.). Women and the structure of society : selected research from the Fifth Berkshire Conference on the History of Women. Durham, N.C.: Duke University Press. pp. 66–73. ISBN 978-0-8223-0603-0. OCLC 988155630 – via Internet Archive.
- Thiselton-Dyer, William Turner (1911). "Bentham, George" . In Chisholm, Hugh (ed.). Encyclopædia Britannica. Vol. 3 (11th ed.). Cambridge University Press. pp. 746–747.

=== Further reading ===
- Jackson, Benjamin Daydon (1906). George Bentham. J.M. Dent. & Company.
- Bentham, George (1997). Filipuik, Marion (ed.). George Bentham: Autobiography, 1800-1834. University of Toronto Press. ISBN 978-0-8020-0791-9.
- Bentham, George (1839–1857). Plantas Hartwegianas.

Academic offices
Preceded by Thomas Bell	President of the Linnean Society; 1861–1874	Succeeded by George James Allman
Awards and achievements
Preceded by Richard Owen	Clarke Medal; 1879	Succeeded by Thomas Huxley
