= Jarrah forest =

Ecological community in Western Australia

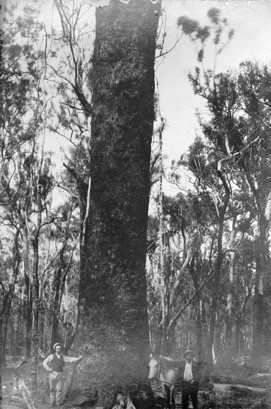

Jarrah forest is tall open forest in which the dominant overstory tree is Eucalyptus marginata (jarrah). The ecosystem occurs only in the Southwest Botanical Province of Western Australia. It is most common in the biogeographic region named in consequence Jarrah Forest.

Most jarrah forest contains at least one other co-dominant overstory tree; association with Corymbia calophylla is especially common, and results in which is sometimes referred to as jarrah-marri forest.

Considerable amount of research delineates northern, central and southern jarrah forest which relates to rainfall, geology and ecosystem variance.

== See also ==
- Darling Scarp
