= E. Charles Nelson =

Northern Irish botanist

(Ernest) Charles Nelson (15 September 1951 – 20 May 2024) was an Irish botanist and botanical artist who specialised in the heather family, Ericaceae, especially Erica, and whose past research interests included the Proteaceae especially Adenanthos.

He was the author or editor of over 24 books and more than 150 research papers (usually signed E. Charles Nelson). He was honorary editor of Archives of Natural History (the journal of the Society for the History of Natural History) between 1999 and 2012 and remained closely linked with the journal as one of the Associate Editors, and was honorary editor of Heathers (yearbook of the recently (2020) disbanded Heather Society) for 23 years until 2017.

== Early life and education ==
Charles Nelson was born in Belfast, Northern Ireland but the family lived in Enniskillen and he was educated at Portora Royal School, and obtained a Bachelor of Science degree in botany at the Aberystwyth University. He then moved to Australia where he obtained a PhD from the Australian National University (Canberra) in 1975, for his studies into the taxonomy and ecology of Adenanthos.

== Career ==
He then returned to Ireland, taking up the position of horticultural taxonomist at the Irish National Botanic Gardens, Glasnevin (Dublin). While based in Dublin he was one of the founding members of the Irish Garden Plant Society, chairing the inaugural meeting; he was subsequently made an honorary member. His interest in the history of Irish gardens and their plants continued, and he wrote frequently on Irish garden history for The Irish garden magazine. Until his resignation in late 2018, he was co-president, with David Gilliland, of the Northern Ireland Heritage Gardens Trust which he was instrumental in establishing (as the Northern Ireland Heritage Gardens Committee) in 1980.

== Later life ==
From 1996 he lived in England, originally in Outwell, near Wisbech in west Norfolk. In late 2020, following the death of his wife, he moved to Sutton St Edmund in South Lincolnshire. In his later years he worked as a freelance botanist, author and editor, and until 2015 frequently lead botanical holidays especially to Crete. His more recent publications include a biography of John Scouler, a Scottish naturalist who was Professor of Mineralogy to the Royal Dublin Society, published in June 2014 by the Glasgow Natural History Society.

In April 2014, the National Botanic Gardens of Ireland issued Nelson's biography of the botanical artist and plantsman, Lady Charlotte Wheeler-Cuffe; entitled Shadow among splendours: the adventures of Lady Charlotte Wheeler-Cuffe among the flowers of Burma 1897–1921. The book is illustrated with examples of Lady Cuffe's paintings and lengthy extract from her correspondence to her mother. In collaboration with David J. Elliott, executive director of the Catesby Commemorative Trust, Nelson edited the Trust's book The curious Mister Catesby – a naturalist explores new worlds which was published for the Trust by the University of Georgia Press in April 2015. The Catesby Commemorative Trust has been reformed (2020) as the Mark Catesby Centre, University of South Carolina, and Nelson was an (honorary) Senior Research Director of the centre.

== Awards and honours ==
In May 2013, he received the Society for the History of Natural History's Founders' Medal, and on 26 June 2020 was elected one of the Society's honorary members. In February 2015 the Royal Horticultural Society awarded Nelson the Veitch Memorial Medal. In September 2016, at the Annual General Meeting of The Heather Society, the Society's Award of Merit was given to Nelson and to Daphne Everett for their work on the Society's behalf. On 3 December 2016, Nelson was one of three recipients of the Royal Horticultural Society of Ireland's prestigious Medal of Honour; the co-recipients were Helen Dillon and Thomas Pakenham.

== Notable publications ==
Two of Nelson's books have been awarded the accolade of "Reference Book of The Year" by the Garden Media Guild (formerly the Garden Writers Guild): in 2001, A heritage of beauty. The garden plants of Ireland. An illustrated encyclopaedia (ISBN 0-9515890-1-6), and in 2012, Hardy heathers of the northern hemisphere: Calluna, Daboecia, Erica (ISBN 978-1-84246-170-9).

== See also ==
- Nelson's taxonomic arrangement of Adenanthos
