= Hemichoanella =

Hemichoanella Temporal range: Arenig

Scientific classification
- Kingdom: Animalia
- Phylum: Mollusca
- Class: Cephalopoda
- Order: †Orthocerida
- Family: †Baltoceratidae
- Genus: †Hemichoanella; Teichert and Glenister (1954)

Genus of nautiloids

The Genus Hemichoanella is a small, extinct, orthoconic nautiloid cephalopod from the Lower Ordovician of Western Australia assigned to the orthoceratoid family, Baltoceratidae. Hemichoanella and the Baltoceratidae are part of the subclass of once diverse and numerous shelled cephalopods known as the Nautiloidea.

Hemichoanella is characterized by its straight, smooth longiconic shell with a circular cross section, large marginal siphuncle and sutures with deep narrow ventral lobes. Septal necks are hemichoanitic, the source of the name, and reach halfway to the previous septa. Connecting rings are thick and uniform, each extending from the tip of a septal neck to the tip of the preceding neck. (T&G 1954)

Hemichoanella was named by Teichert and Glenister in 1954 (T&G 1954) for specimens found in Emanuel Creek, Kimberley Division, Western Australia. The type species, Hemichoanella canningi (Teichert & Glenister) is named in honor of Alfred Canning, who from 1906 to 1908, explored the eastern part of the Desert Basin and who discovered and opened up the Canning Stock Route.

Hemichoanella is considered a particularly advanced baltoceratid (T&G 1954) which differs from Baltoceras in having longer septal necks.

== See also ==
- Nautiloid
  - List of nautiloids
