= Numalgun Land District =

Coordinates: 16°40′S 125°50′E

Numalgun Western Australia
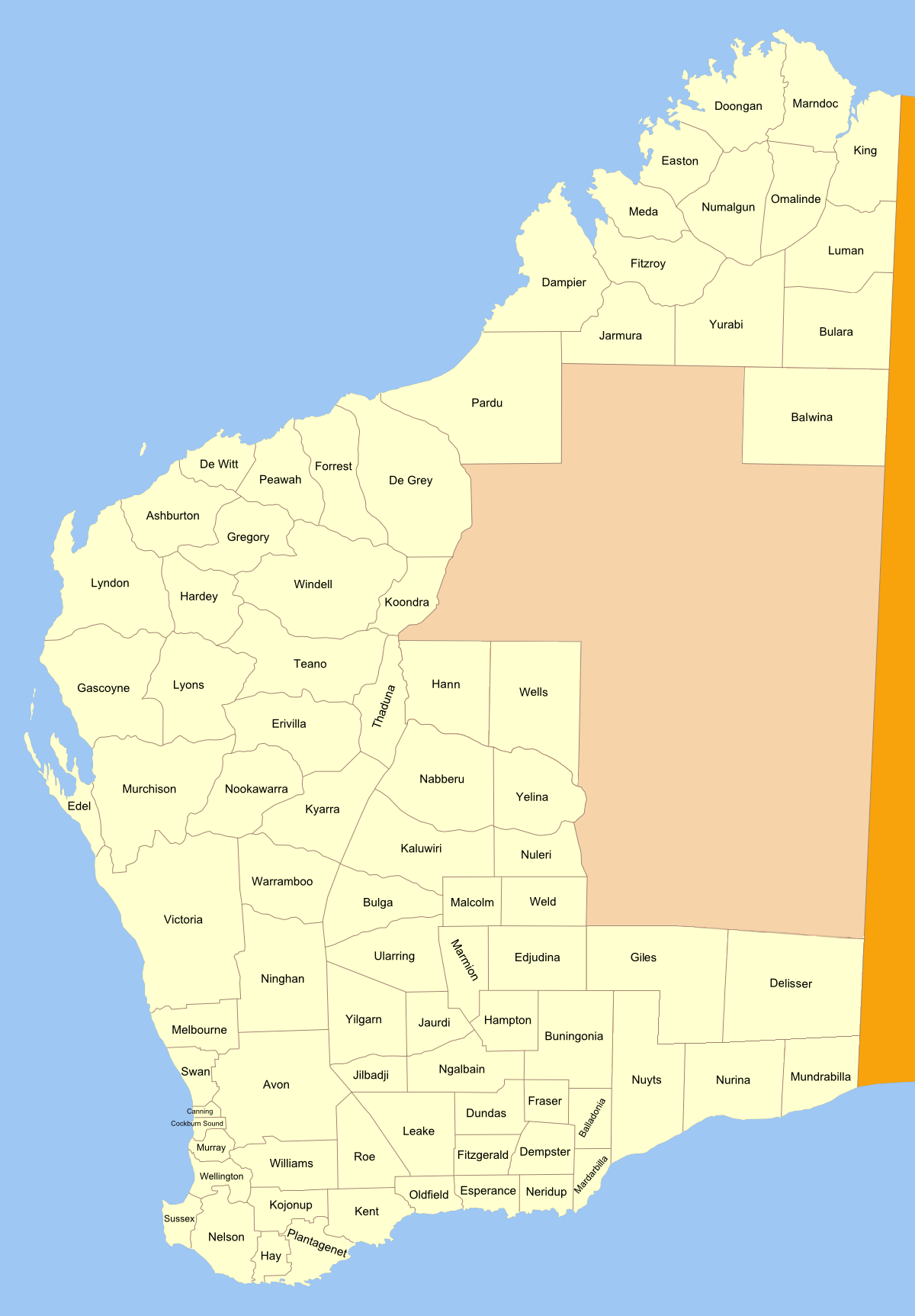
Lands administrative divisions around Numalgun:
Easton	Doongan	Marndoc
Meda	Numalgun	Omalinde
Fitzroy	Yurabi	Yurabi

Numalgun Land District is a land district (cadastral division) of Western Australia, located within the Kimberley Land Division in the Kimberley region of the state.

== Location and features ==
The district is located inland in the Shire of Wyndham-East Kimberley and north-east of the Wunaamin-Miliwundi Ranges. It contains most of the Gibb River Station.

== History ==
Numalgun was gazetted on 13 June 1906.
