= Easton Land District =

Coordinates: 15°56′S 125°03′E

Easton
- Cadastral division
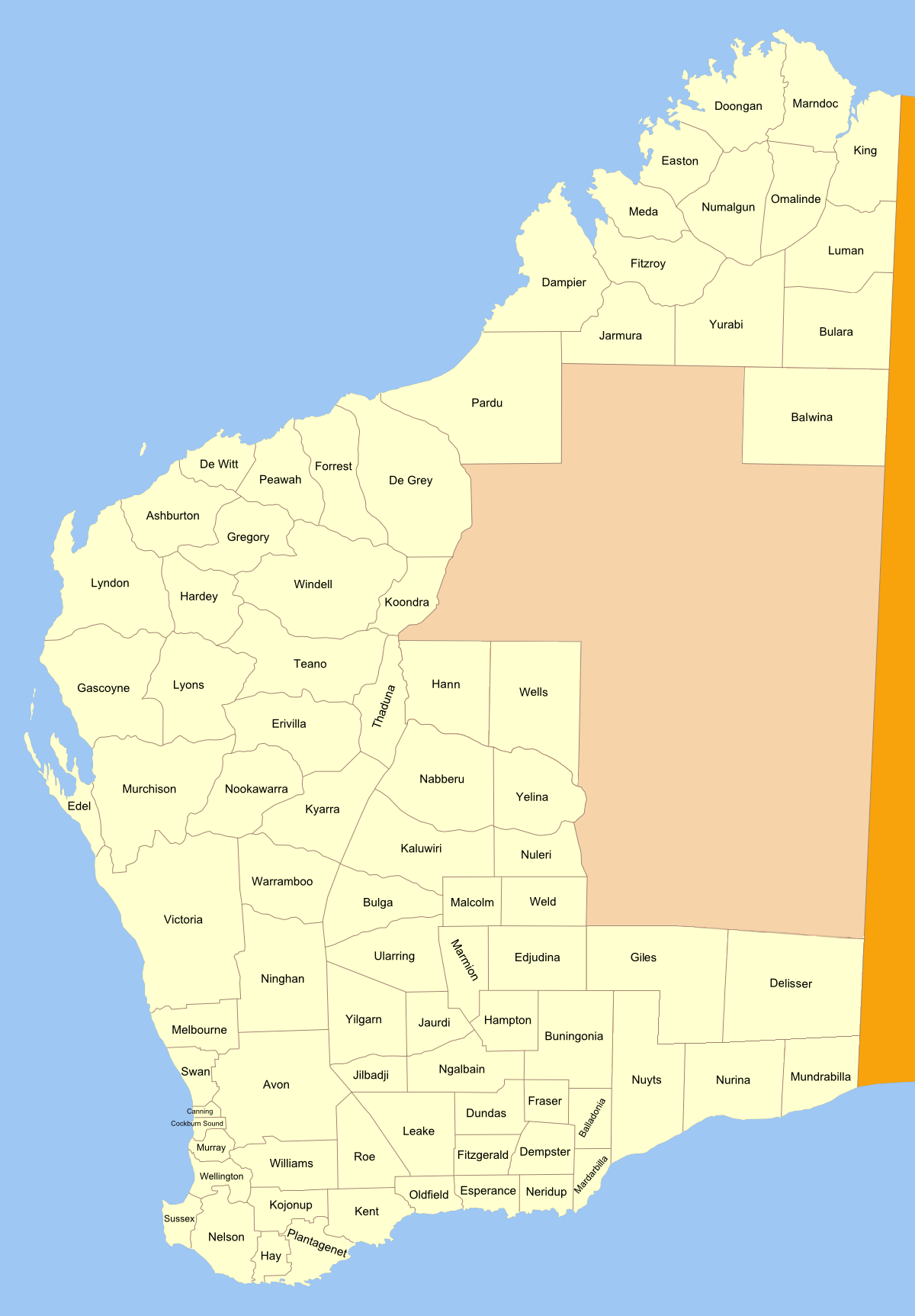
- Country: Australia
- State: Western Australia
- Established: 1906
Lands administrative divisions around Easton
Timor Sea	Timor Sea	Doongan
Timor Sea	Easton	Numalgun
Meda	Meda	Numalgun

Easton Land District is a land district (cadastral division) of Western Australia, in the Kimberley Land Division in the Kimberley region of the state.

== Location and features ==
The district falls between the Princess May Range to the north and the Wunaamin-Miliwundi Ranges to the south, on the Kimberley's rugged Timor Sea coast, approximately 200 kilometres (120 mi) north-east of Derby and 400 kilometres (250 mi) west of Kununurra. No towns or former towns fall within the district, with the only notable non-natural feature being the former Kunmainya Aboriginal mission run by the Presbyterian Church of Australia.

== History ==
It was first gazetted as the Kwinana Land District on 13 June 1906. It was renamed on 22 August 1956 to Easton in order to avoid confusion with the new Kwinana industrial development south of Perth. The new name honoured William Easton (1893-1987), who in 1921 was the first European to traverse the Mitchell Plateau and led a state government expedition into the North Kimberley area.
