= Goodenia suffrutescens =

Conservation status
- Priority One — Poorly Known Taxa (DEC)

Scientific classification
- Kingdom: Plantae
- Clade: Tracheophytes
- Clade: Angiosperms
- Clade: Eudicots
- Clade: Asterids
- Order: Asterales
- Family: Goodeniaceae
- Genus: Goodenia
- Species: G. suffrutescens

Binomial name
- Goodenia suffrutescens Carolin

Species of plant

Goodenia suffrutescens is a species of flowering plant in the family Goodeniaceae and is endemic to inland areas of north-eastern Western Australia. It is an undershrub with low-lying branches, toothed, lance-shaped to egg-shaped leaves with the narrower end towards the base, and thyrses of blue flowers.

== Description ==
Goodenia suffrutescens is a subshrub up to 1 m (3 ft 3 in) tall, with woody, low-lying branches and sticky foliage. The leaves are more or less clustered at the base of the plant and are lance-shaped to egg-shaped with the narrower end towards the base, 80–110 mm (3.1–4.3 in) long and 30–40 mm (1.2–1.6 in) wide with toothed edges. The flowers are arranged in thyrses up to 400 mm (16 in) long on peduncles up to 20 mm (0.79 in) long with leaf-like bracts and egg-shaped bracteoles 6–14 mm (0.24–0.55 in) long. Each flower is on a pedicel up to 5 mm (0.20 in) long. The sepals are lance-shaped, about 3 mm (0.12 in) long, the petals blue, 15–20 mm (0.59–0.79 in) long. The lower lobes of the corolla are about 4 mm (0.16 in) long with wings about 2 mm (0.079 in) wide. Flowering occurs around August and the fruit is a cylindrical capsule about 10 mm (0.39 in) long.

== Taxonomy and naming ==
Goodenia suffrutescens was first formally described in 1980 by Roger Charles Carolin in the journal Telopea from material he collected by on Billiluna Station in 1970. The specific epithet (suffrutescens) refers to the sub-shrub form of the plant.

== Distribution and habitat ==
This goodenia grows on laterite pavements on the north-western edge of the Tanami Desert in north-eastern Western Australia.

== Conservation status ==
Goodenia suffrutescens is classified as "Priority One" by the Government of Western Australia Department of Parks and Wildlife, meaning that it is known from only one or a few locations which are potentially at risk.
