= Wapet Road =

Desert track in Pilbara, Western Australia

Coordinates: 22°20′15″S 124°44′22″E

Wapet Road Western Australia
- Image of the Route
- Type: Road

The Wapet Road, also known as the Kidson Track, is an outback track in the Pilbara region of Western Australia. Since 2014, both the part of the road that is within the native title lands of the Nyangumarta people (Nyangumarta country) and the adjacent part between Nyangumarta country and Great Northern Highway are called Nyangumarta Highway.

The name of the road was derived from early tracks cut by the oil exploration company WAPET.

Despite it predominantly passing through desert, birdwatchers and others access the track notwithstanding its difficult traverse.

It approximately follows the Canning Basin boundary in the Great Sandy Desert from a starting point 45 kilometres (28 mi) south west of the Sandfire Roadhouse on the Great Northern Highway, and continues for 621 kilometres (386 mi) south east to the Kunawaritji community on the Canning Stock Route.

It passes through country known as the Western Desert cultural bloc and more specifically the Martu Determined Native Title Area. Parts of the Kidson track also pass through other native title areas including Nyungamarta, Kulyakartu and Ngurra.

There is a separation of the Kidson Track from the Wapet Road as separate parts of the same track on one source, however another does not make the distinction.
