= Doongan Land District =

Coordinates: 14°50′S 126°40′E

Doongan Western Australia
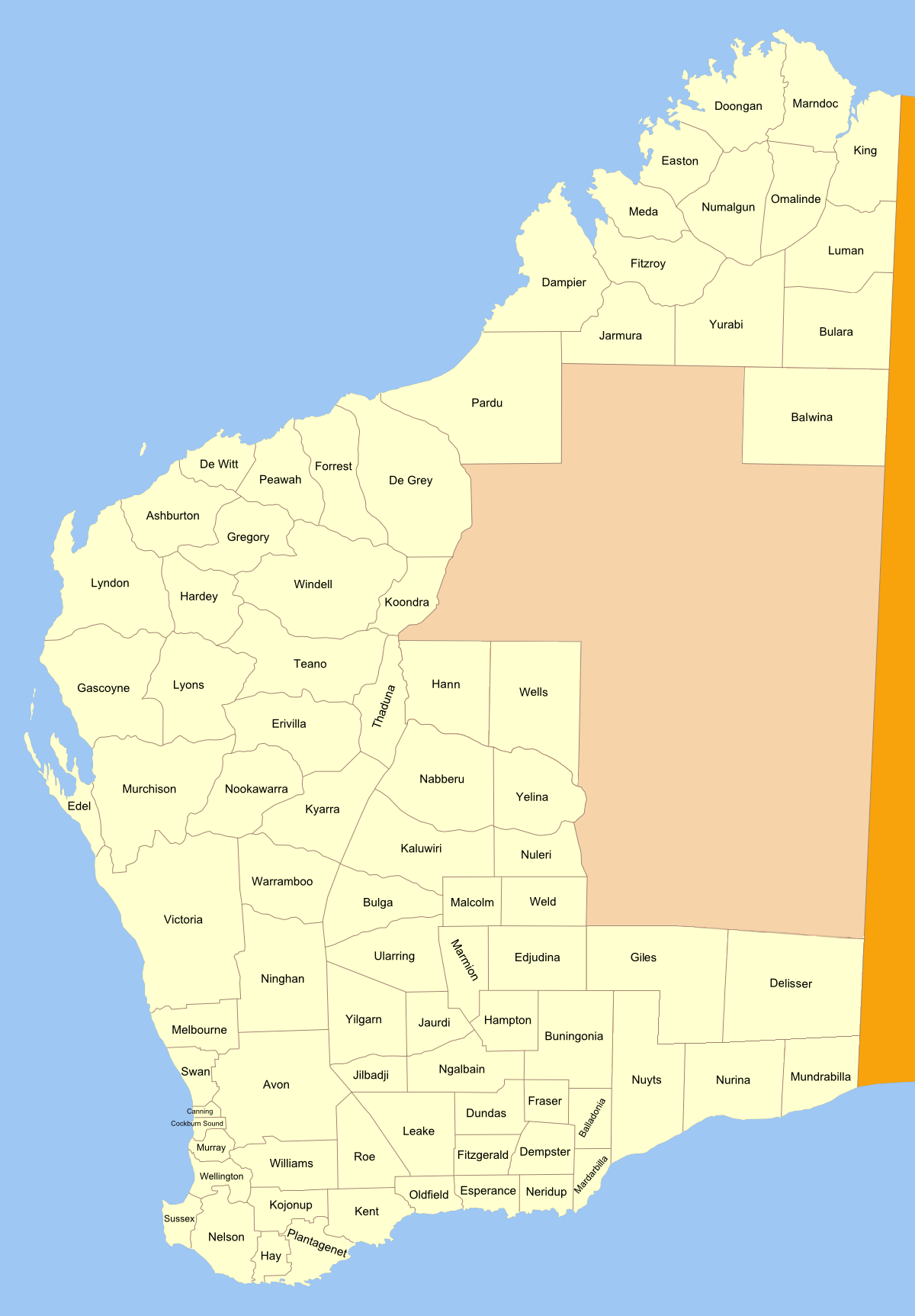
Lands administrative divisions around Doongan:
Timor Sea	Timor Sea	Marndoc
Timor Sea	Doongan	Marndoc
Easton	Numalgun	Omalinde

Doongan Land District is a land district (cadastral division) of Western Australia, located within the Kimberley Land Division in the Kimberley region of the state.

== Location and features ==
The district is located on the Kimberley's rugged Timor Sea coast falls between the Princess May Range to the southwest and the Drysdale River to the east, and includes the town of Kalumburu and the former Drysdale River Mission.

== History ==
It was first gazetted as the Dungan Land District on 13 June 1906. Its spelling was changed to Doongan on 19 May 1916 in an effort to more accurately capture its correct Aboriginal pronunciation.
