= Billiluna =

Billiluna may refer to:

- Billiluna (Mindibungu), Indigenous Australian community in the Kimberley region of Western Australia
- Billiluna Station, cattle station in the Kimberley region of Western Australia
