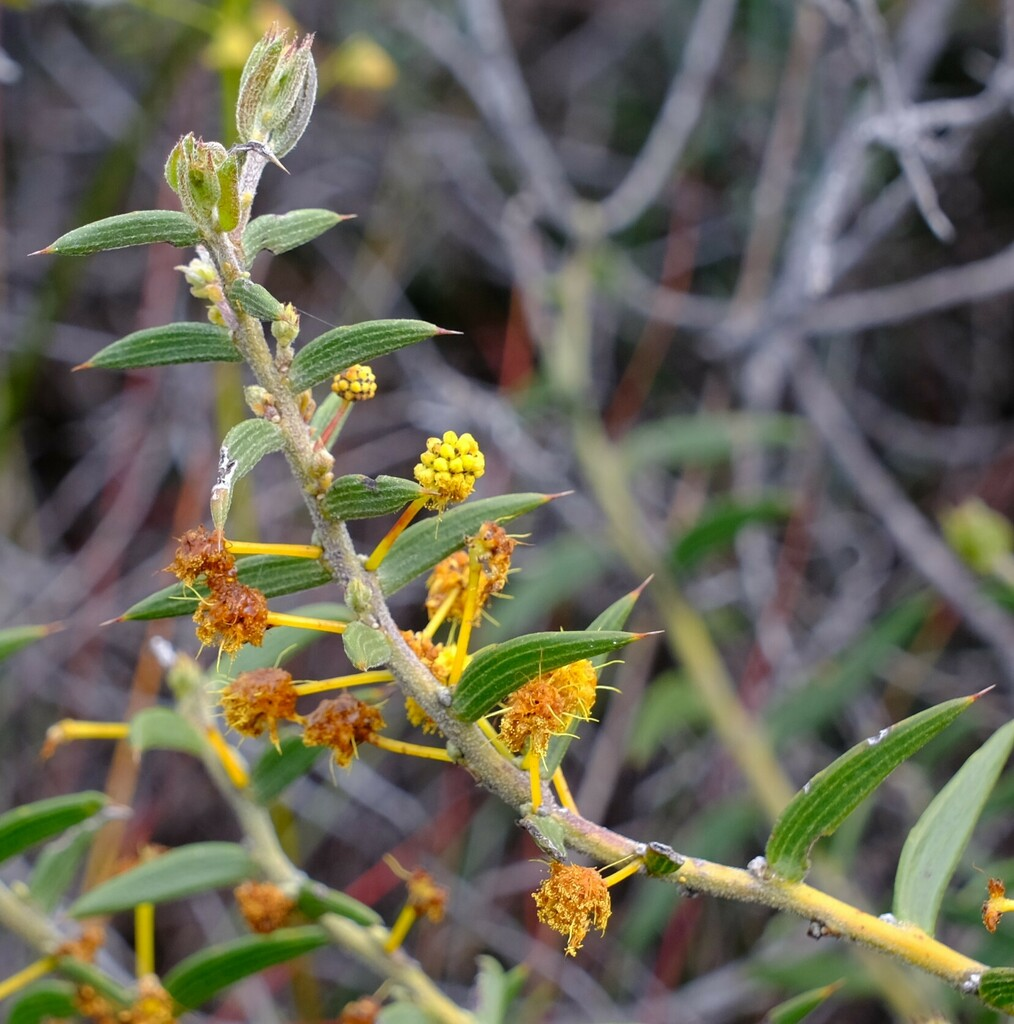
- Subspecies latipes

Scientific classification
- Kingdom: Plantae
- Clade: Embryophytes
- Clade: Tracheophytes
- Clade: Angiosperms
- Clade: Eudicots
- Clade: Rosids
- Order: Fabales
- Family: Fabaceae
- Subfamily: Caesalpinioideae
- Clade: Mimosoid clade
- Genus: Acacia
- Species: A. latipes

Binomial name
- Acacia latipes Benth.
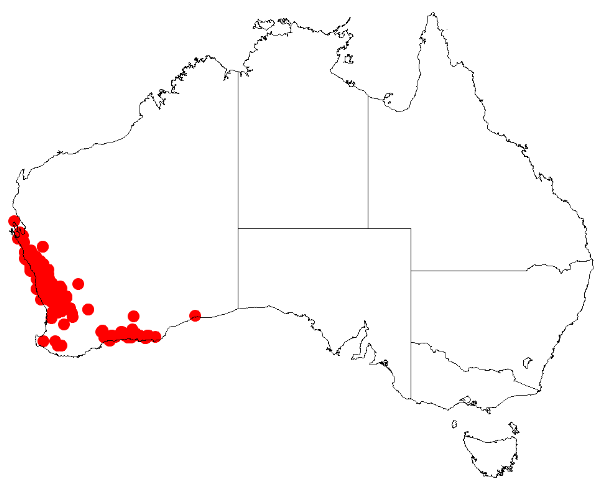
- Occurrence data from AVH

Synonyms
- Acacia latipes var. pubescens Meisn.; Acacia striatula Benth.; Racosperma latipes (Benth.) Pedley

= Acacia latipes =

Species of legume

Acacia latipes is a species of flowering plant in the family Fabaceae and is endemic to the south-west of Western Australia. It is a shrub, with sessile, narrowly elliptic, linear or tapered phyllodes, spherical heads of golden yellow flowers and linear, leathery pods raised over the seeds.

== Description ==
Acacia latipes is diffuse to dense, erect or prostrate shrub that typically grows to a height of 0.3–2 m (1–7 ft) and has angled branches that are sometimes more or less glaucous, sometimes covered with soft hairs. Its phyllodes are sessile, narrowly to widely elliptic to triangular, linear or tapered, 10–50 mm (0.39–1.97 in) long, 1–7 mm (0.039–0.276 in) wide, sharply pointed, rigid, glabrous and often glaucous. The phyllodes have three or four raised main veins. The flowers are borne in two to five spherical heads in axils on glabrous peduncles mostly 5–9 mm (0.20–0.35 in) long. The heads are 3–5.5 mm (0.12–0.22 in) in diameter with 24 to 67 golden yellow flowers. Flowering occurs from June to October, and the pods are linear, up to 60 mm (2.4 in) long, 3.5–6 mm (0.14–0.24 in) wide and leathery, raised over the seeds and more or less constricted between them. The seeds are widely elliptic to egg-shaped, 2.8–3.7 mm (0.11–0.15 in) long and mottled with a helmet-shaped aril.

== Taxonomy ==
Acacia latipes was first formally described by George Bentham in Hooker's London Journal of Botany from specimens collected by James Drummond in the Swan River Colony.

In 1999, Richard Cowan and Bruce Maslin described two subspecies of S. latipes in the journal Nuytsia, and the names are accepted by the Australian Plant Census:

- Acacia latipes Benth. subsp. latipes has straight to slightly curved, narrowly oblong to widely elliptic, triangular, linear or tapered phyllodes, mostly 3.5–8 times longer than wide and often glaucous or subglaucous.
- Acacia latipes subsp. licina R.S.Cowan & Maslin has phyllodes normally curved upwards, elongated linear, rarely straight, 23 to 40 times longer than wide and not glaucous.

== Distribution and habitat ==
Acacia latipes grows in sand, sandy loam, granite, laterite or limestone on sandplains, hills and flats.

- Subspecies latipes occurs from Hamelin to Quairading with scattered populations from near Lake King to east of Scaddan in the Avon Wheatbelt, Esperance Plains, Geraldton Sandplains, Jarrah Forest, Mallee and Swan Coastal Plain bioregions.
- Subspecies licina occurs from Port Gregory to near Three Springs in the Avon Wheatbelt and Geraldton Sandplains bioregions.

== Conservation status ==
Acacia latipes and subsp. latipes are listed as 'not threatened' by the Government of Western Australia Department of Biodiversity, Conservation and Attractions, but subsp. licina is listed as "Priority Three" meaning that it is poorly known and known from only a few locations but is not under imminent threat.

== See also ==
- List of Acacia species
