= Billiluna Station =

Pastoral lease in Western Australia

Coordinates: 19.5578°S 127.6805°E

Location in Western Australia

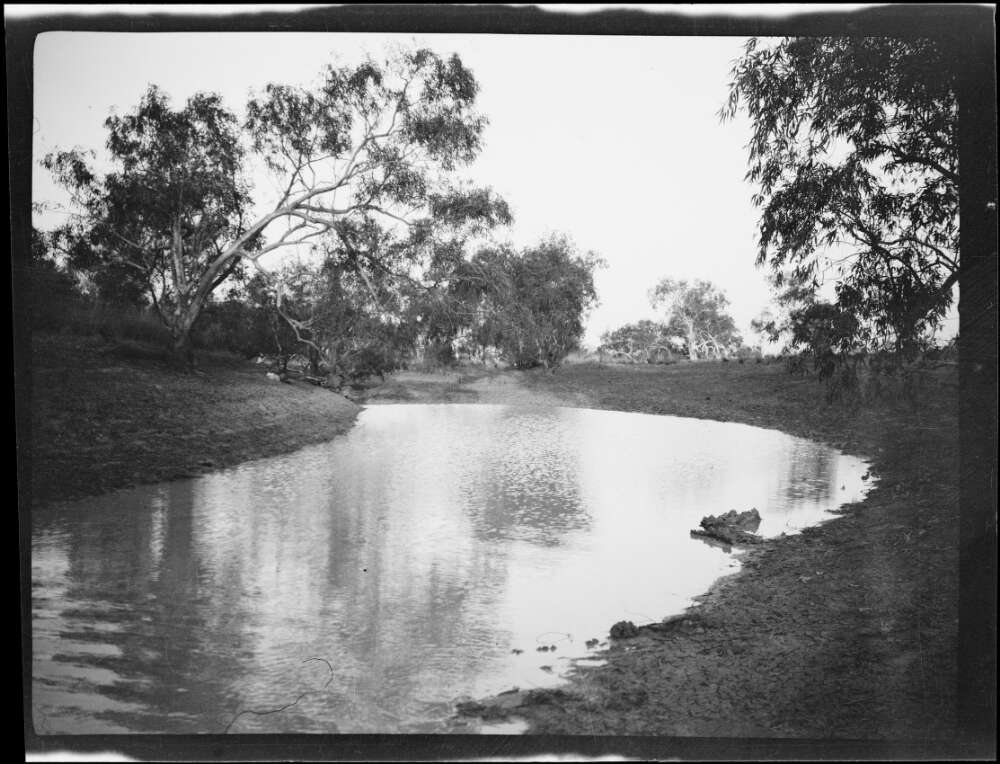
Billiluna Pool 1925

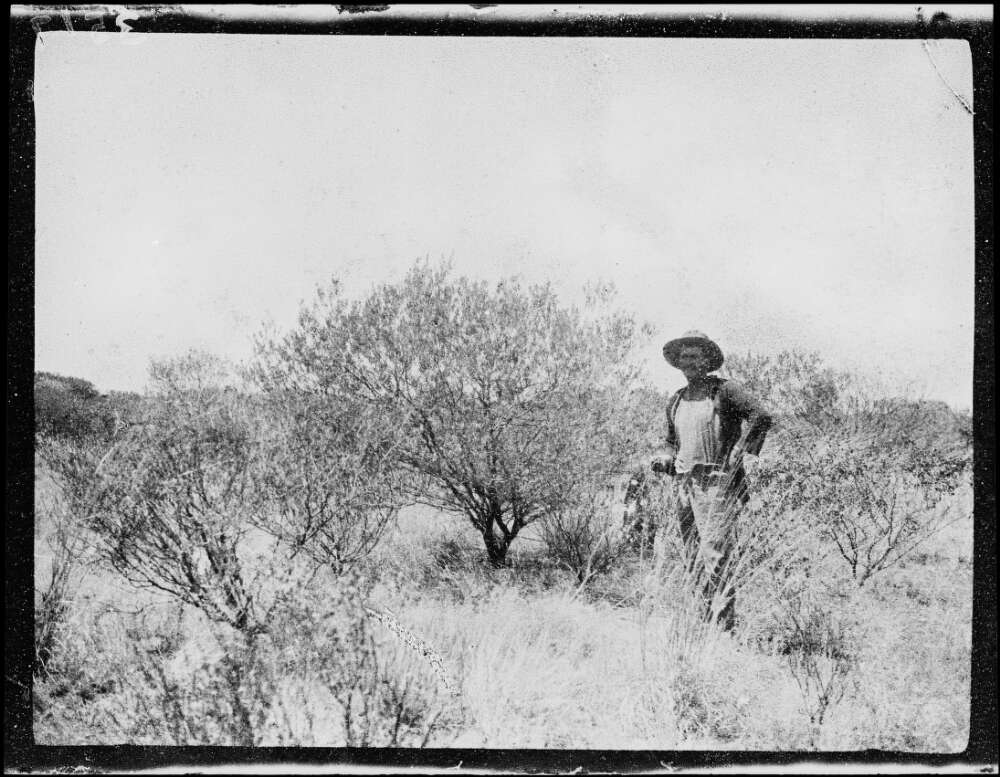
Man in front of mulga scrub, Billiluna, 1925

Billiluna Station is a pastoral lease that operates as a cattle station in Western Australia.

It is located approximately 70 kilometres (43 mi) north of Balgo and 150 km (93 mi) south of Halls Creek in the Kimberley region of Western Australia.

The name of the station is taken from a pool in Sturt Creek found and mentioned by Alfred Canning when he mapped out the Canning Stock Route in 1907.

The Billiluna Pastoral Company Limited, previously known as Sturt Creek Pastoral Company Limited, was registered in 1920.

In 1922 the station manager, Joseph Condren, was shot dead and an employee named Tim O'Sullivan was shot in the thigh by a Bilingara youth, in retribution for the fact that O'Sullivan had abducted his wife for sexual purposes and refused to allow her to return to her husband. O'Sullivan later died and by the time Mr Barry, the manager of nearby Sturt Creek Station, had arrived to investigate he found two graves and the homestead looted of all firearms and ammunition. A young boy was sent with a threatening message for any white men who attempted to follow the perpetrators. A few months later a policeman, Constable Flinders, attempted to apprehend the suspect at his camp on Boolka Creek on Bohemia Downs Station. The suspect, named Banjo, was shot and killed during the arrest. In October of that year, more than a dozen Aboriginal people from the Kutjungka region were killed by police in the Sturt Creek massacre in a punitive expedition led by Constable J.J.Cooney in response to the attacks on Condren and O'Sullivan.

The property was placed on the market in 1925 as part of a deceased estate. At this time it occupied an area of 897,000 acres (3,630 km^{2}) and had two wells in addition to good surface water sources. Buildings included a two-room house, beef house and harness house. Four sets of yards had also been built along with a fenced horse paddock. It was stocked with 2,500 head of cattle and about 40 horses.

An Armstrong Siddeley was the first car to be driven to Billiluna as part of an 1,100-mile (1,770 km) trip through the Kimberley. The vehicle was landed at Derby and driven to the shores of Lake Gregory at Billiluna via Sturt Creek Station over 87 miles (140 km) of trackless country.

The Canning Stock Route was closed early in 1925 after falling into disuse as a result of stockmen being attacked by Aboriginals. Stock from Billiluna had to be transported via Wyndham instead of overlanding using the track. The Billiluna Pastoral Company requested the track be reopened but the government claimed it would cost £5,625 and take six months to repair and refused.

In the early twentieth century, Billiluna stock was moved through and along the Canning Stock Route to the south.

In 2013 the lease was held by the Aboriginal Lands Trust and managed by Mark Gordon.

== See also ==
- List of ranches and stations
- List of pastoral leases in Western Australia
