= Leslie Arthur Schubert =

Leslie Arthur Schubert (aka Les Schubert) was a notable Western Australian pastoralist and author born in Eudunda, South Australia on 25 August 1922 and died in Perth on 22 March 2012. In 1974 he was the largest sheep wool grower in West Australia with over 65,000 merino sheep on three sheep stations and two farms totalling over 500,000 hectares (1,200,000 acres) of pastoral land.

== Early life ==
Born into an immigrant German Lutheran community at Peep Hill to the North East of the Barossa Valley in South Australia, his early life was founded in the traditional German manner. His family moved to Bruce Rock in Western Australia at the start of the Depression in 1929 and while living on a wheat farm his family suffered severe deprivation. Schubert completed his education at the Bruce Rock Primary School, leaving at the early age of 14 to assist his father in running of their farm "Rocky View" five kilometres from the town. In 1932 Schubert accidentally shot himself in the chest with a .22 calibre rifle while shooting birds on his father's farm at Bruce Rock. The bullet narrowly missing his heart.

With the commencement of World War 2, and with his German heritage and religious beliefs he was interred at the Marrinup Internment Camp near Pinjarra where he was engaged in planting pine plantation trees and timber cutting to support the War effort.

Upon release from the camp Schubert married Dorothy Joan Sloan from a pioneering family in East Rockingham and took up crown land at various locations in the South West of Western Australia, developing significant wheat and sheep farms. They had three sons and one daughter.

== Pastoral industry involvement ==
He and his family moved to sheep station Pardoo in the Pilbara in March 1963 having sold his agricultural interests at Gnowangerup to Sir Eric Smart.

In 1966 he swapped Pardoo Station with Karl Stein for the cattle stations Louisa & Bohemia Downs in the Kimberley Region along with a cash balance in addition.

While on Louisa Downs together with his two sons they pioneered the technique of aerial mustering cattle in the Kimberley using a Cessna 182 aircraft. This improved the efficiency and viability of many remote cattle stations, and is now widely practised using helicopters.

In 1969 he sold Louisa and Bohemia Downs to the recently formed Australia Land & Cattle Company and purchased Yallalong Station, a sheep station in the Murchison Region.

Schubert subsequently purchased Nookawarra Station, near Cue, and Hamelin Station at Shark Bay, and in 1974 was the largest wool grower in Western Australia, shearing in excess of 50,000 sheep and producing over 1,000 bales of wool. At this time he became active in the Pastoralist & Graziers Association of WA as well as becoming a member of the State Council of the Liberal Party of Australia.

== Mining involvement ==
While living on Louisa Downs Station he was shown outcrops of cuprite near Mount Bertram in the Wunaamin Miliwundi Ranges (formerly King Leopold Ranges) by indigenous Australian stockmen working on the station. Subsequently, he developed interests in mining exploration and entered into a number of partnerships with Western Australia mining entrepreneurs including Alan Bond.

== Later years ==
Upon his retirement and the death of his wife, Joan Sloan, Schubert made regular visits to Louisa Downs station where he assisted the indigenous Cox Family and their descendants in the management of the station. During this time he wrote and published 6 books. The first an Autobiography "Wiping Out the Tracks," in three Volumes followed by social commentary on indigenous Australia stockmen in 2 books: "Kimberley Dreams and Realities" and "A Century of Freddie Cox" His last work was a romantic novel "Leila," a fictionalised version of the life of a pastoralist's wife. In addition he wrote an anthology of poems: The Poetry of My Life.
