= Sandfire, Western Australia =

Coordinates: 19.767027°S 121.091609°E

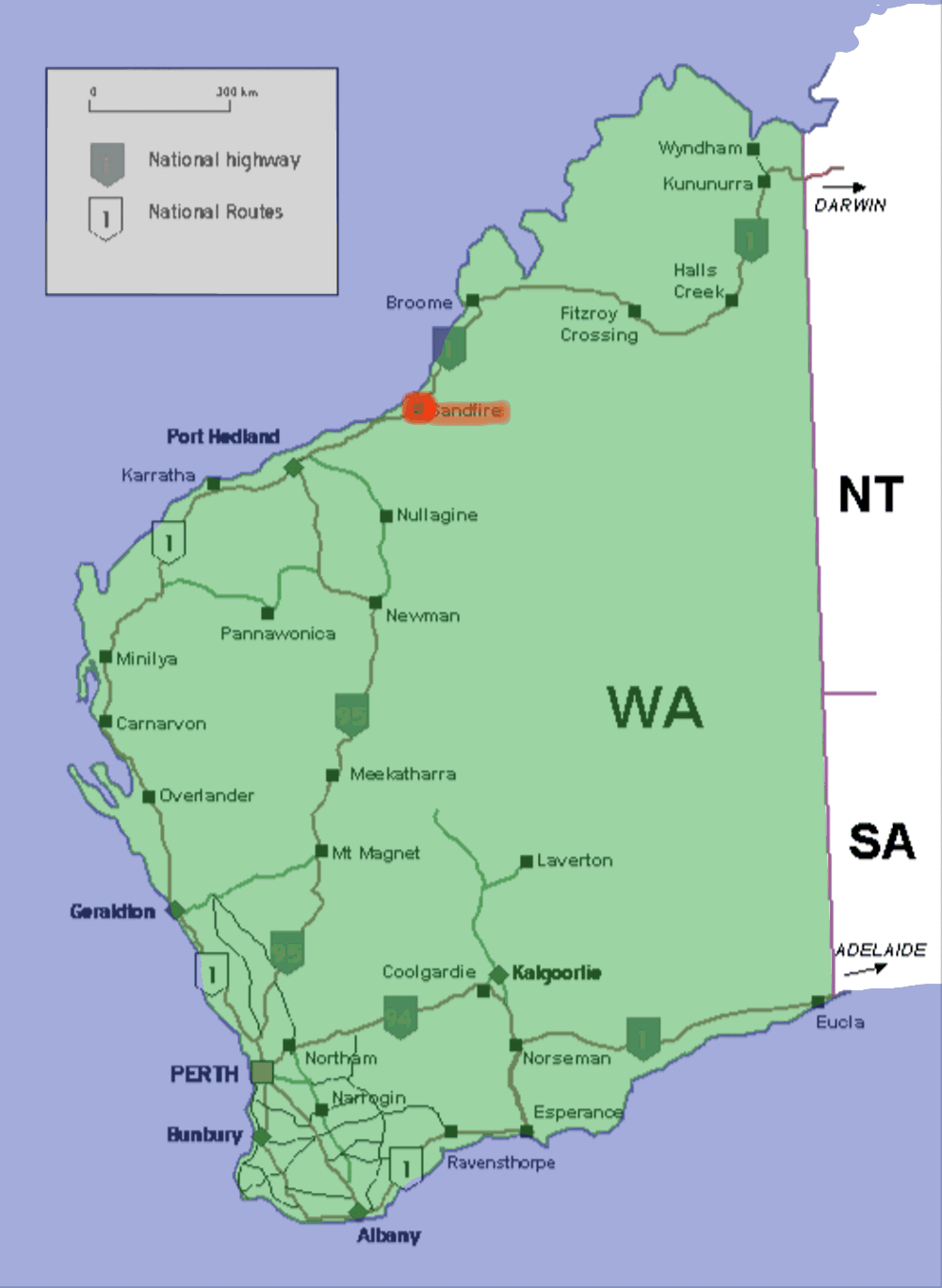
Location of Sandfire in Western Australia (red)

Sandfire is a location and roadhouse on the Great Northern Highway in Western Australia between Port Hedland and Broome. It is on the western edge of the Great Sandy Desert, and east of Wallal Downs and Mandora Station. It is inland, and located 20 km from the coast in the region of the Mandora Marsh and the Eighty Mile Beach, 45 km north of the Kidson Track turnoff. The area surrounding the roadhouse is of high cultural significance to the Nyangumarta people, who hold native title over the area.

It is only one of three fuel stations (the others being Pardoo and Roebuck roadhouses) in the 610 km between those two towns.

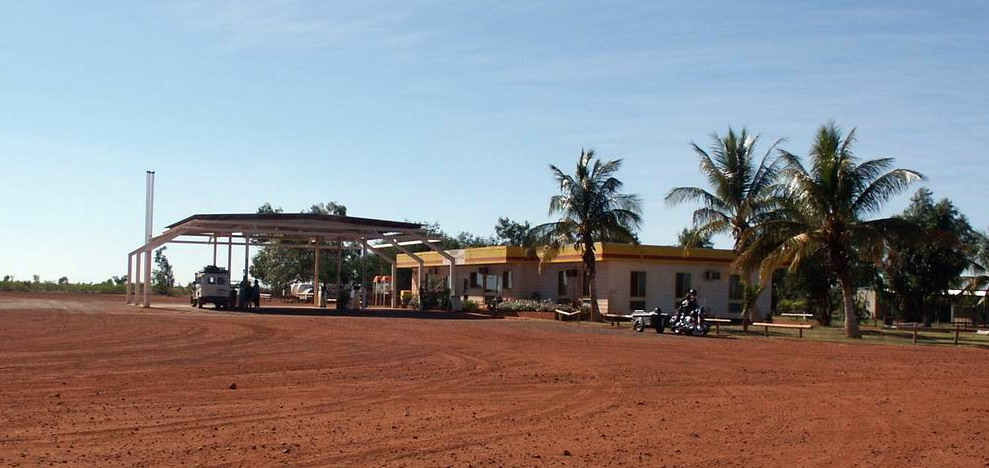
Sandfire Roadhouse in 2003.

In April 2007, the Sandfire Roadhouse was extensively damaged by fire, leaving a $1.5 million damage bill. It was damaged again in December 2009. In the 2011 and 2012 cyclone seasons the location was included in warnings.

The petrol station, restaurant, bar, caravan park and motel accommodation is available between 7 a.m. and 7 p.m. every day of the year.

Sandfire Roadhouse was mentioned in the Australian rock band, The Angels, song "North-west Highway Cruise", on their Skin & Bone album.
