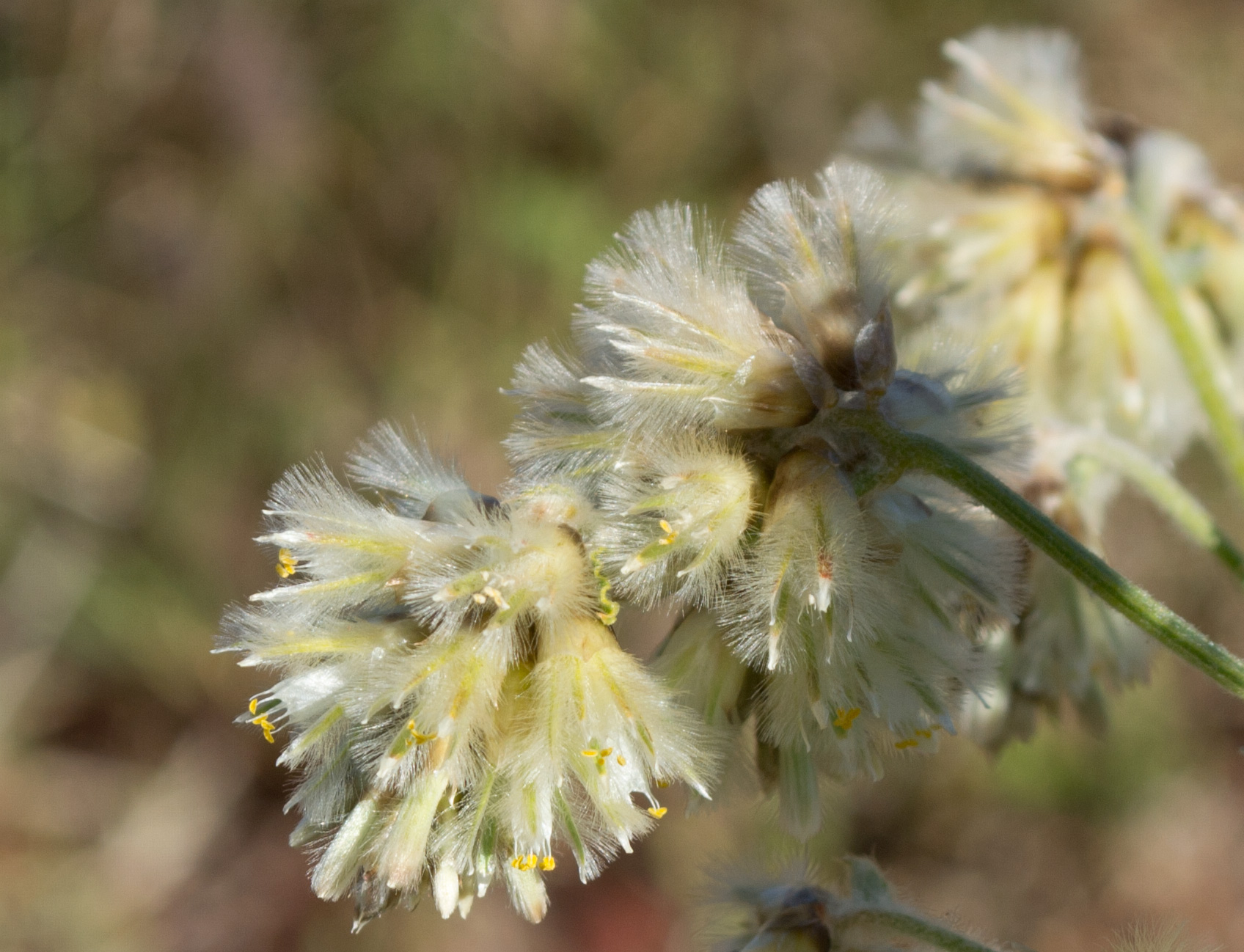
- South of Pardoo Station

Scientific classification
- Kingdom: Plantae
- Clade: Tracheophytes
- Clade: Angiosperms
- Clade: Eudicots
- Order: Caryophyllales
- Family: Amaranthaceae
- Genus: Ptilotus
- Species: P. auriculifolius

Binomial name
- Ptilotus auriculifolius (A.Cunn. ex Moq.) F.Muell.

Synonyms
- Ptilotus siphonandrus (Diels) Schinz; Trichinium auriculifolium A.Cunn. ex Moq. Trichinium siphonandrum Diels

= Ptilotus auriculifolius =

Species of grass-like plant

Ptilotus auriculifolius is a species of flowering plant in the family Amaranthaceae and is endemic to the north of Western Australia. It is an erect annual herb, with fleshy leaves at the base of the plant and on the stem, and oval to cylindrical spikes of hairy, densely arranged, green flowers with five fertile stamens.

== Description ==
Ptilotus auriculifolius is an erect annual herb that typically grows up to 0.4–1.3 m (1 ft 4 in – 4 ft 3 in) high and has fleshy leaves at the base of the plant and on the stems, 10–130 mm (0.39–5.12 in) long and 4–65 mm (0.16–2.56 in) wide. The flowers are green and densely arranged in oval to cylindrical spikes 12–110 mm (0.47–4.33 in) long and 25–35 mm (0.98–1.38 in) wide. There is a bract 4–5 mm (0.16–0.20 in) long and colourless bracteoles 7.0–8.4 mm (0.28–0.33 in) long at the base of the flowers. The outer tepals are 12.0–13.5 mm (0.47–0.53 in) long and the inner tepals are 11.8–13.0 mm (0.46–0.51 in) long with a tuft of hairs. Flowering occurs from May to October.

== Taxonomy ==
This species was first described in 1849 by Alfred Moquin-Tandon from an unpublished description by Allan Cunningham, and was given the name Trichinium auriculifolium in de Candolle's Prodromus Systematis Naturalis Regni Vegetabilis. In 1882, Ferdinand von Mueller transferred the species to the genus, Ptilotus as P. auriculifolius. The specific epithet (auriculifolius) means 'ear-lobed-leaved'.

== Distribution and habitat ==
Ptilotus auriculifolius grows on rocky hills and stony, undulating plains in the Gascoyne, Great Sandy Desert, Little Sandy Desert, and Pilbara bioregions of northern Western Australia.

== Conservation status ==
Ptilotus auriculifolius is listed as "not threatened" by the Government of Western Australia Department of Biodiversity, Conservation and Attractions.

== Gallery ==
Ptilotus auriculifolius

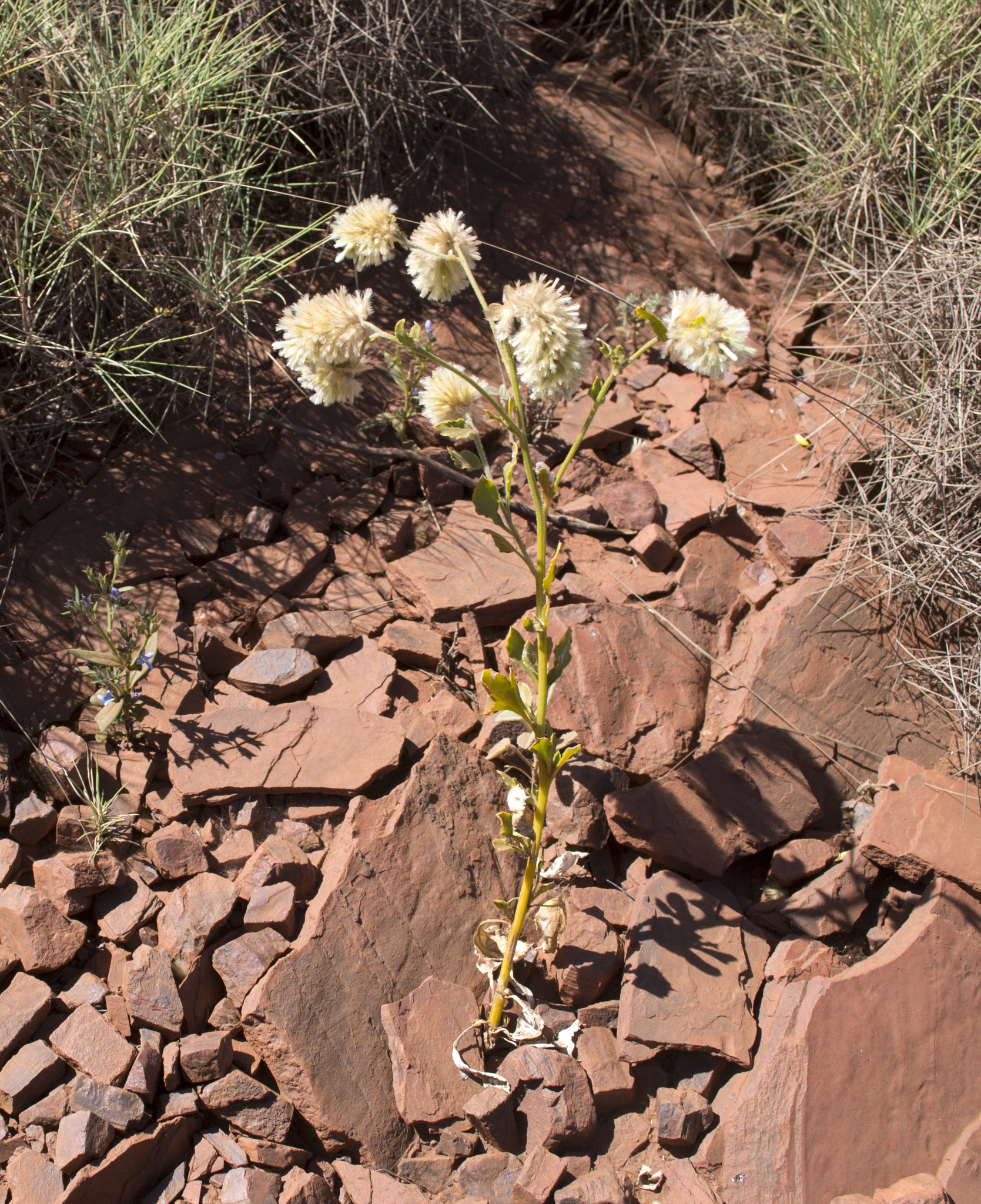

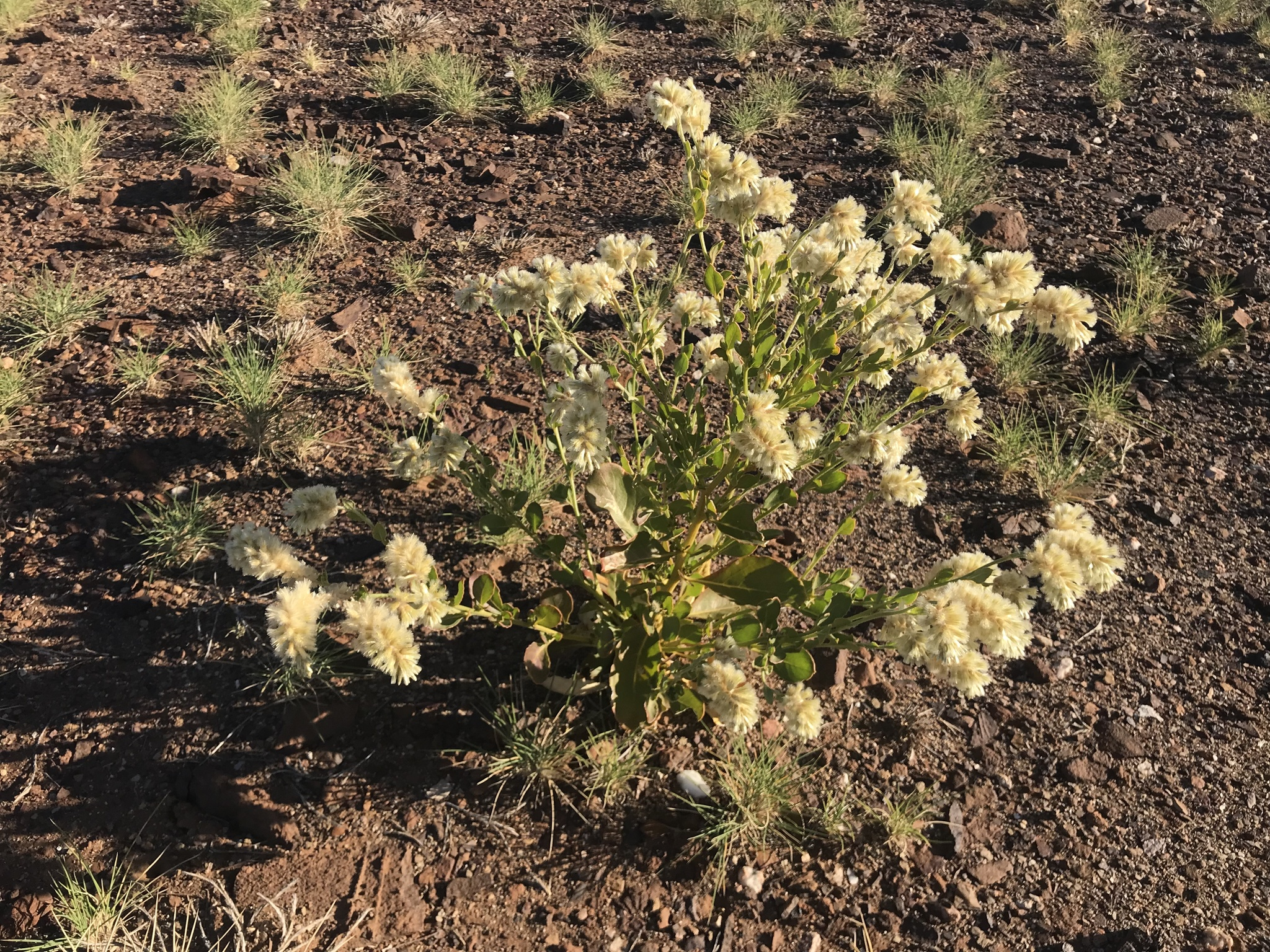

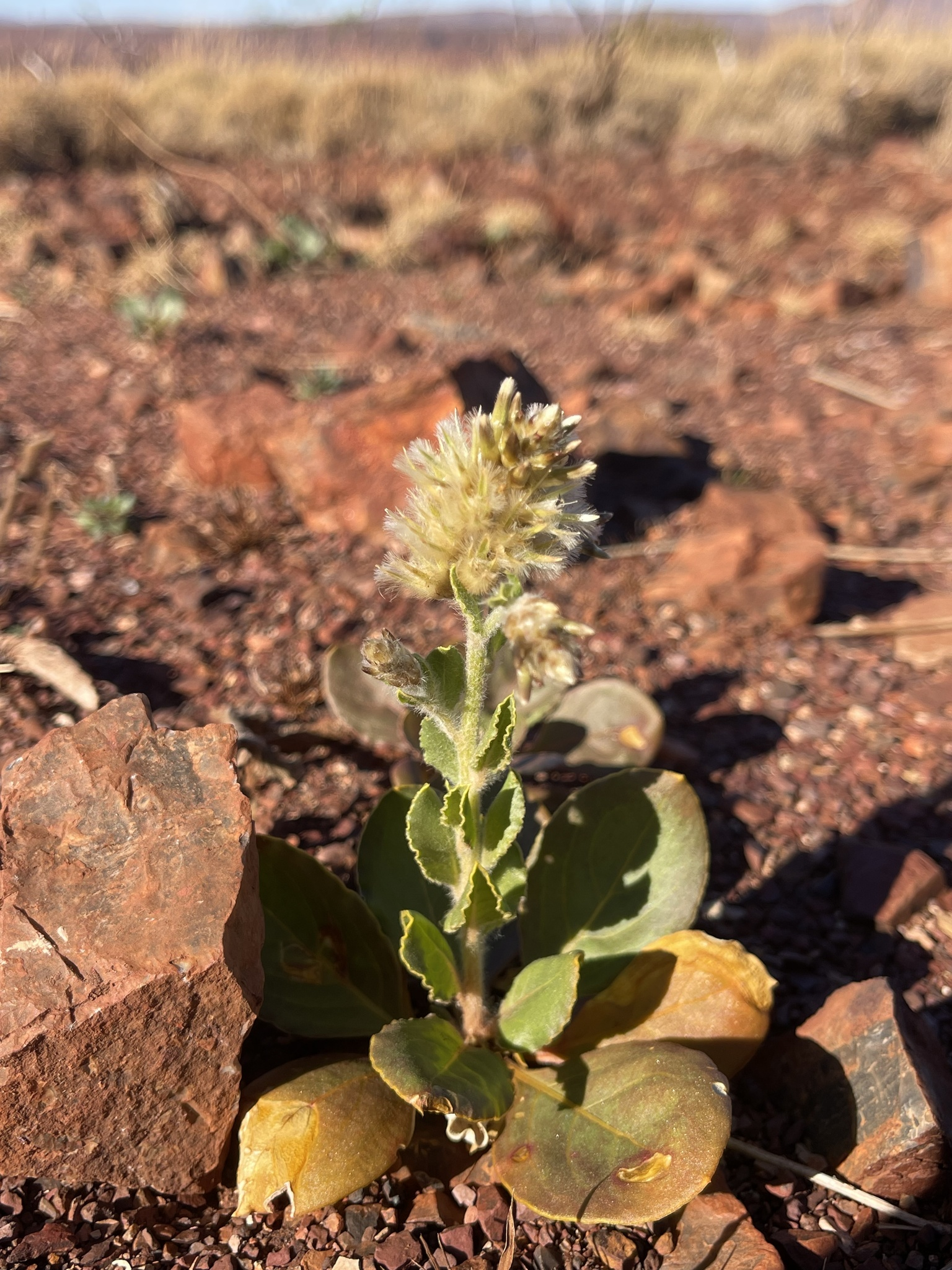

== See also ==
- List of Ptilotus species
