= Hamelin Station, Western Australia =

Conservation reserve and former pastoral lease in Western Australia

Hamelin Reserve
- Hamelin Station
- IUCN category V (protected landscape/seascape)
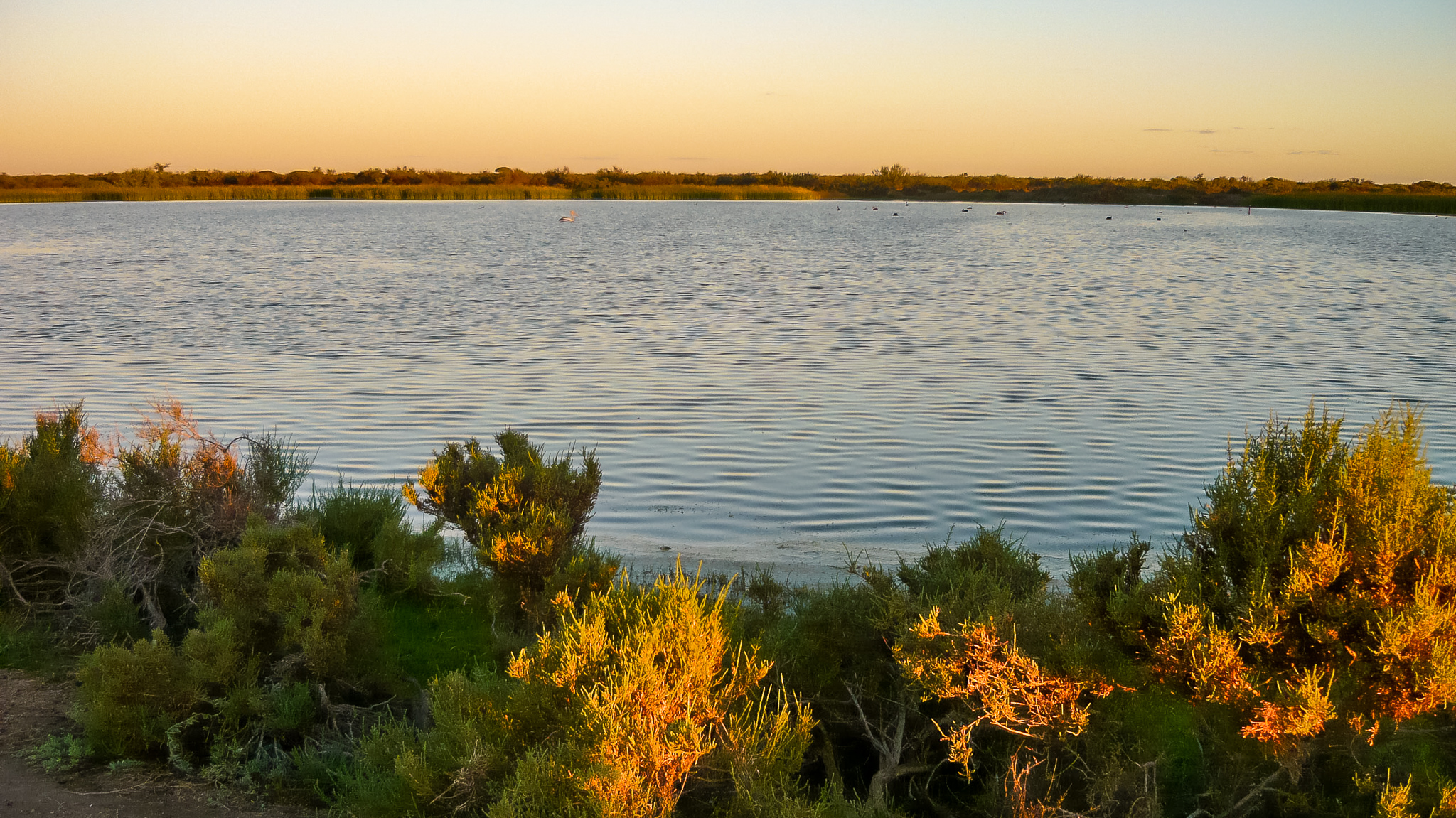
- The artificial lake created by the free flowing artesian bore in 2012

- Location within Western Australia
- Location: Western Australia
- Coordinates: 26.48°S 114.33°E
- Area: 201,010 ha (776.1 sq mi)
- Established: 1884
- Operator: Bush Heritage Australia
- Owner: Bush Heritage Australia
- Website: https://www.bushheritage.org.au/places/hamelin

Hamelin Station or Hamelin Station Reserve is a conservation reserve that was a pastoral lease, occupying an area of 201,010 hectares (496,700 acres) near the Shark Bay World Heritage Area in Western Australia. It was formerly a sheep station running merino sheep. The homestead was famous for its artesian bore flowing freely from the Birdrong Formation in the Carnarvon Artesian Basin,, which created an artificial lake that became a haven for bird life. The bore was capped in 2024 to preserve pressure in the aquifer.

The homestead is 3 kilometres from the nearby historic Hamelin Pool Telegraph Station and Post Office. The lease has approximately 32 kilometres of shoreline on the hypersaline Hamelin Pool Embayment, which feature some of the best living stromatolite formations in the world.

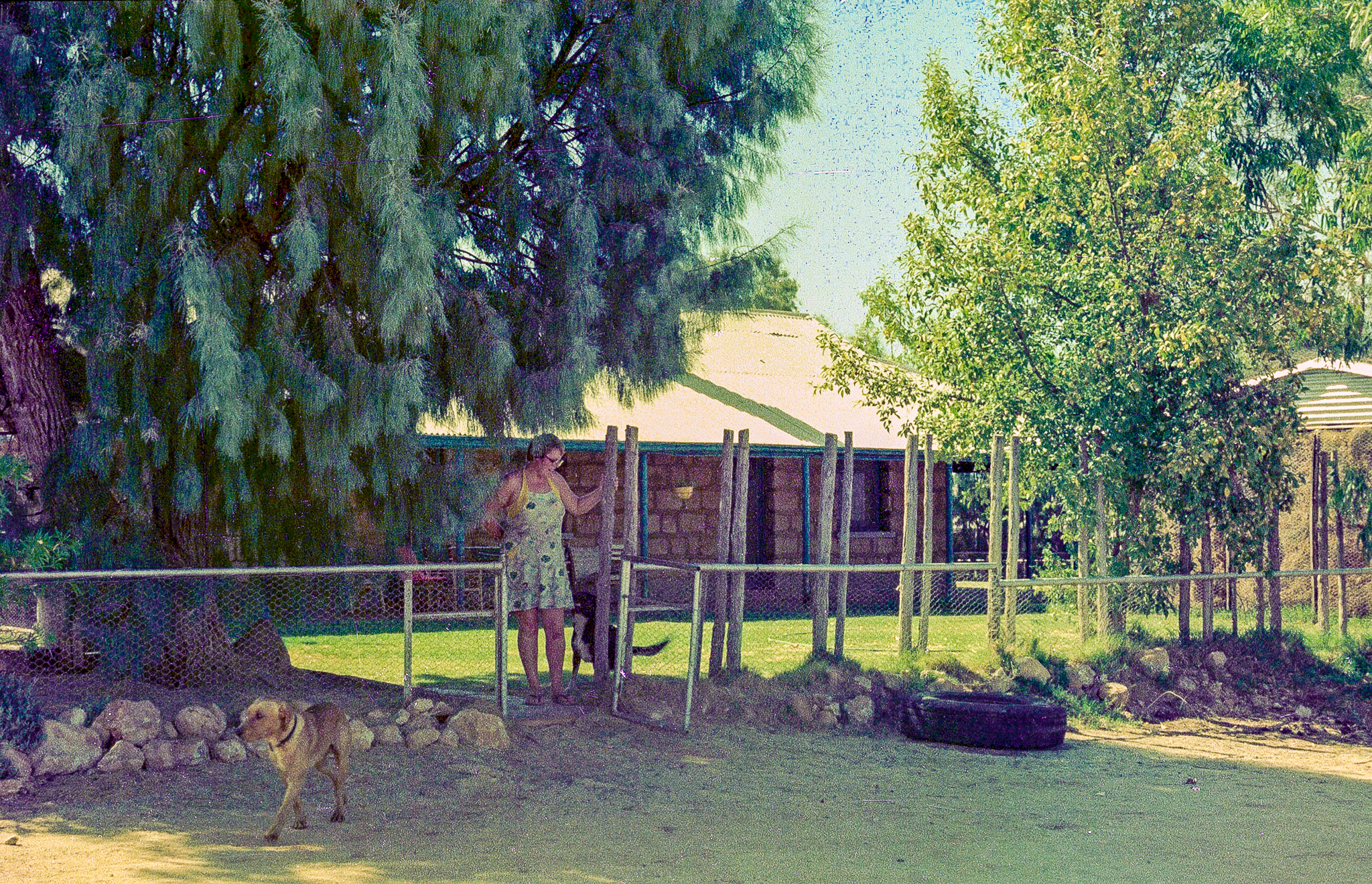
A view of the Hamelin homestead in 1975

== Early years ==
In 1884 the section of telegraph line to Roebourne that passed through the property had been completed.

Parts of the station were taken up in the early 1900s. At that time J. T. Martin, of Roebourne, had unimproved leases in the Hamelin Pool area consisting of 135,000 acres and Messrs Connor, Doherty, and Durack had 94,000 acres adjoining Martin's leases. Both of these lease holdings were sold to the Flintcliff Pastoral Company in July 1907. The Flintcliff Pastoral Company (Frank Cadd), who variously named the leases as Boolagoora or Flint Cliff Station, sold the combined leases to Messrs. Ayliffe and Musk a short time before March 1919.

It was reported in March 1919 that the station had been sold to the Hamelin Pastoral Company. At that time the combined lease comprised some 500,000 acres and has not been expanded since. It became known as Hamelin Station. At the time it was reported to be carrying 10,000 sheep, some horses and a number of camels.

In the early years, the lack of readily available water for stock limited the growth of the station, however the entire station sits on an extensive artesian basin of semi saline water.

The lack of readily available surface or shallow ground water necessitated the drilling of deep artesian and sub artesian bores.

In 1928 the station was under the management of a Mr Taylor, who had embarked on a program of drilling for water. At this time the first bore at the homestead was estimated to have a daily flow of 3,000,000 gallons per day and had created the artificial lake, which he had declared a sanctuary because of the abundant bird life.

A further eight bores had also been drilled with the last one recently completed yielding water at a depth of 140 feet. The abundance of water and the prospect for more lead to rapid expansion in sheep numbers on the station.

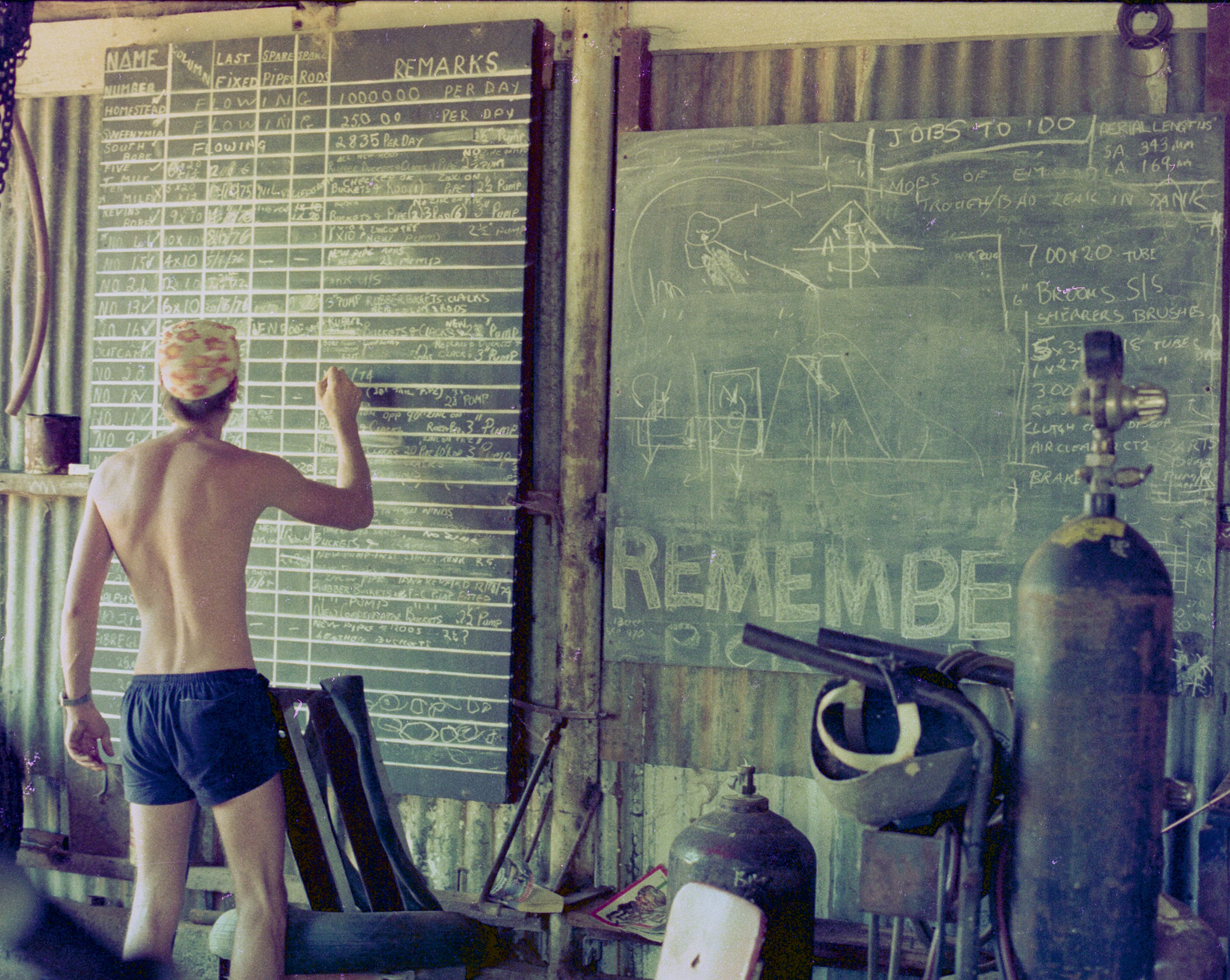
A photo of the "mill board" that recorded the status artesian bore watering points on Hamelin in 1976

The homestead is constructed from compacted coquina shell blocks mined from the nearby coast.

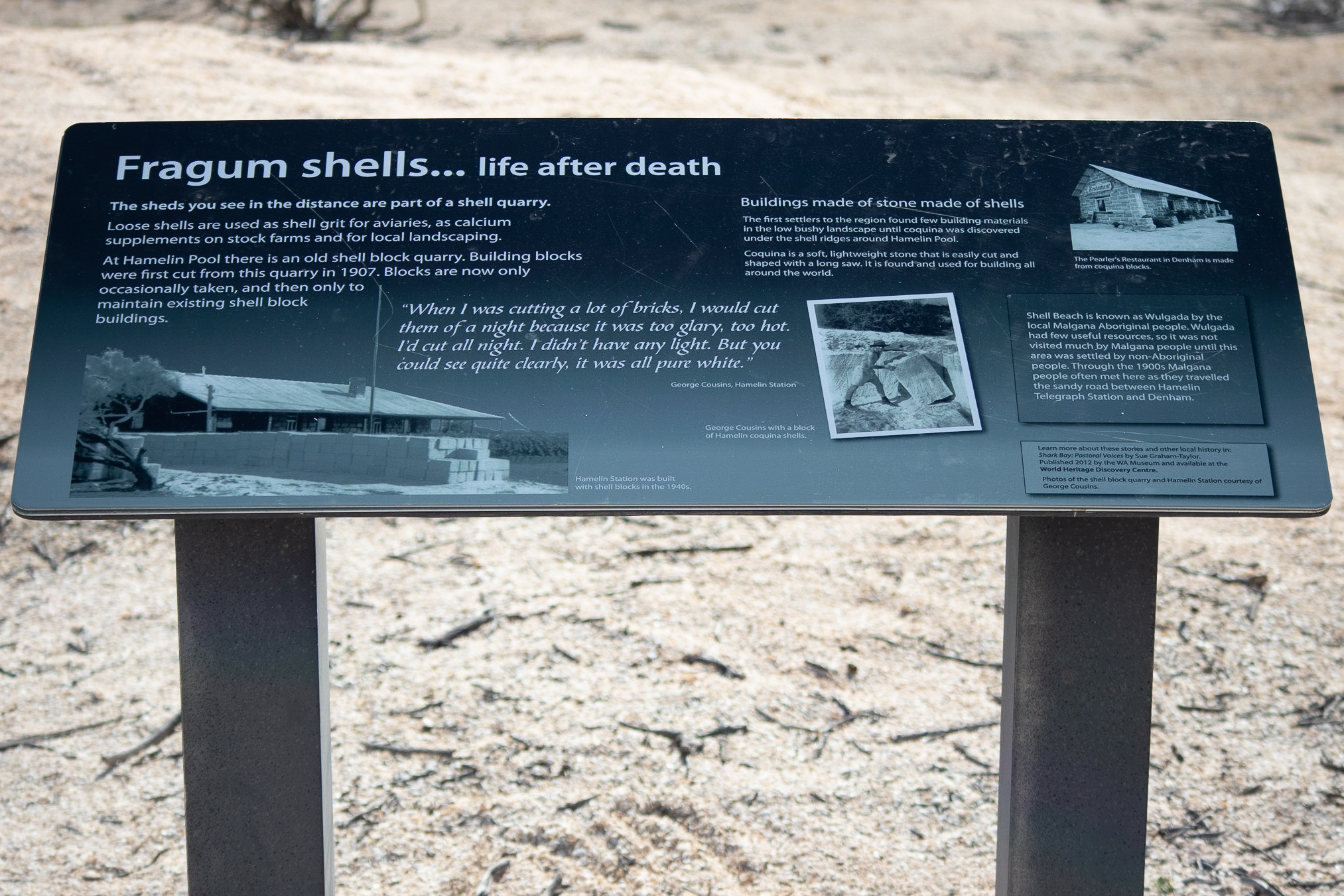
Interpretive signage about the construction of the Hamelin Homestead at Shell Beach.

In the following years sheep numbers varied widely between 10,000 and 26,400; in 1977 it was sold with a guaranteed 18,000 sheep, although this number was subsequently disputed.

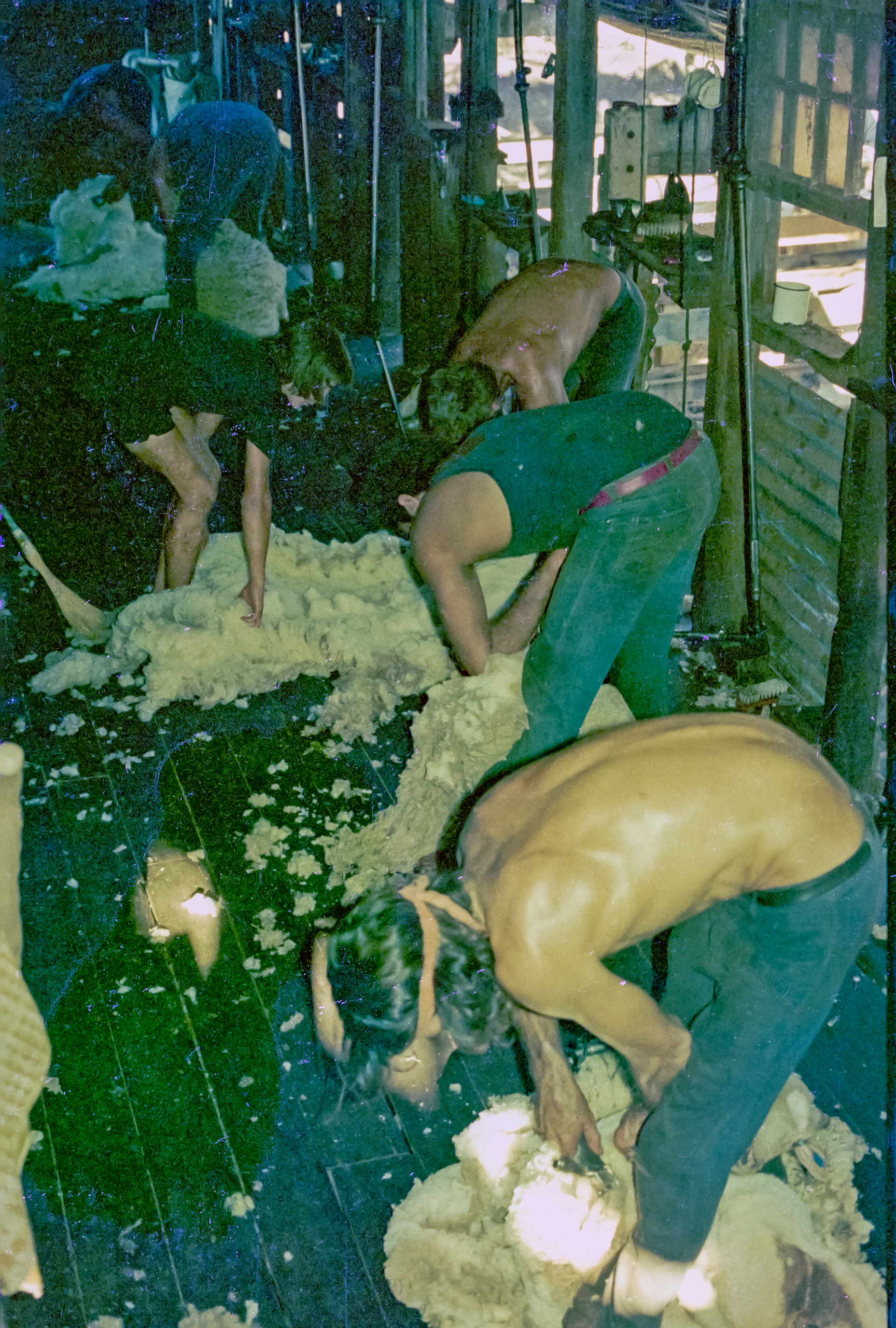
Shearing at Hamelin in 1977

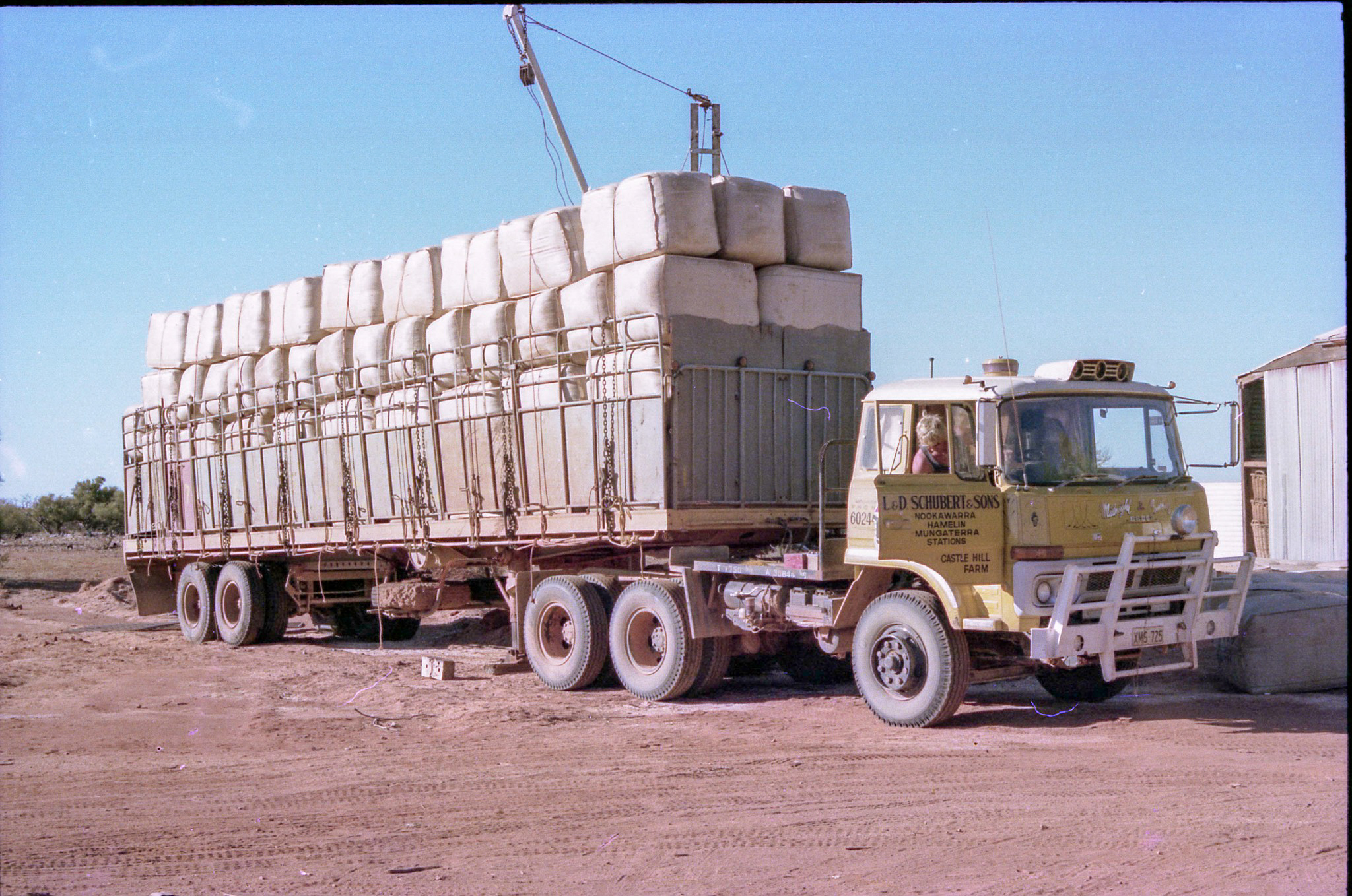
Loading wool at Hamelin in 1977

== Events ==
The station was purchased from the Hamelin Pastoral Company by grazier Richard (Dick) Vincent in 1970, and subsequently sold to pastoralist Les Schubert in 1974 and managed by his son Philip for a number of years before being sold to the politician Ross Lightfoot.

For many years feral goats were abundant on the property thriving on the low scrubland of the area. The Schubert family in 1976 mustered and shipped over 4,000 goats to the Middle East from the property.

== De-stocking and conservation ==
The Wake family subsequently purchased it in September 1978 before selling it to Bush Heritage Australia in March 2015. It is now known as Hamelin Station Reserve.

Since that time all stock have been removed from the station and the artificial watering points shut down.

The shearers' quarters were renovated to serve as a tourist and camping facility for visitors until this was closed in late 2024.

Hamelin is now managed as a conservation reserve and serves as a base for researchers studying marine geology and terrestrial ecology. Species that have been studied include the Western Grasswren and Australian Sandlewood.
