= Alfred Canning =

Australian surveyor (1860-1936)

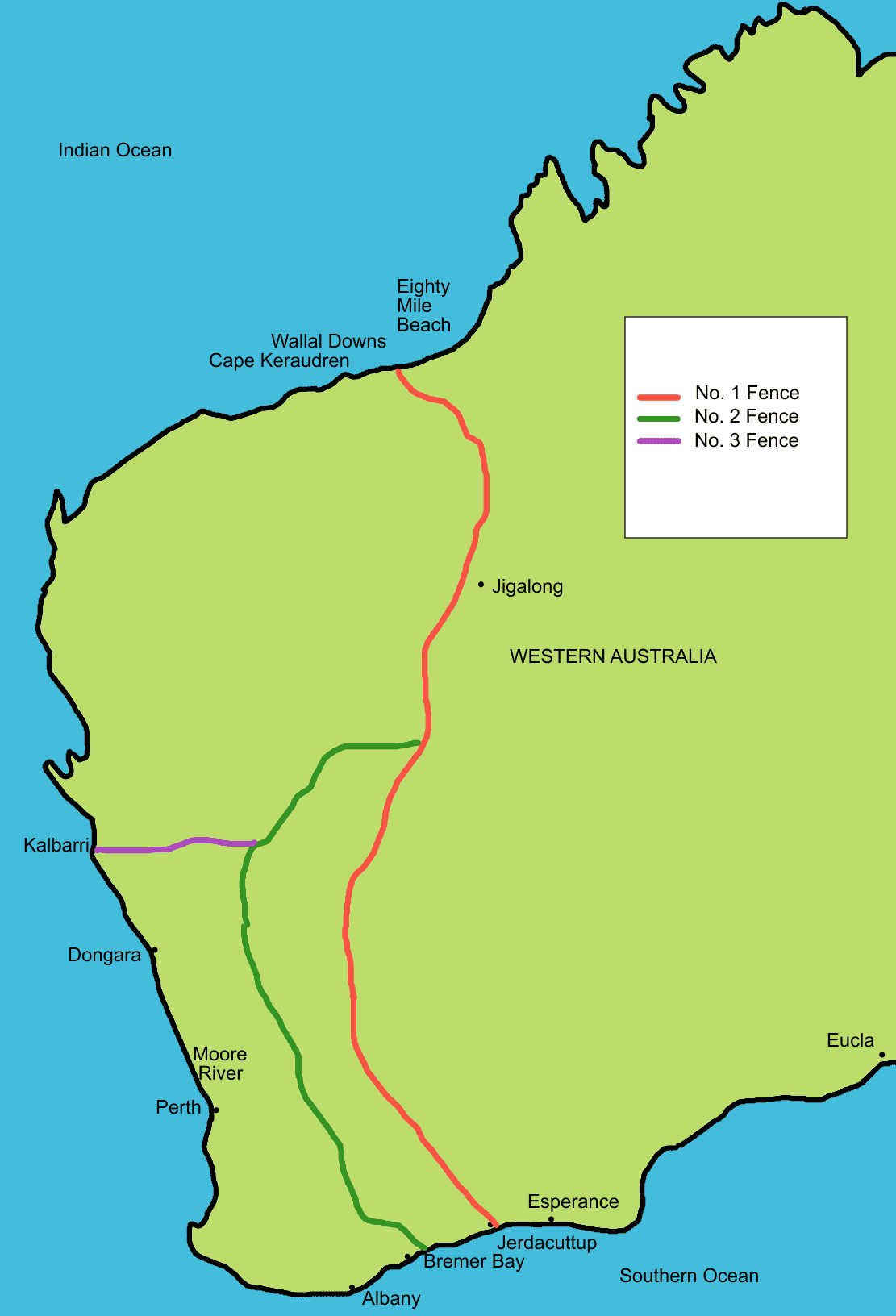
The Number 1 Rabbit-proof fence marked in red which Canning surveyed

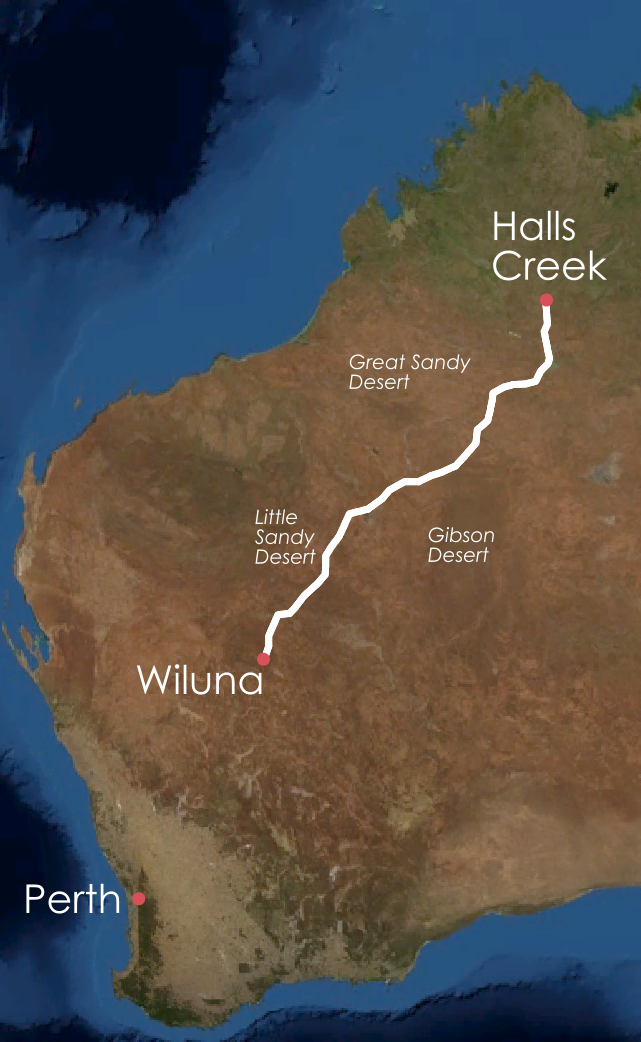
Map of the Canning Stock Route

Alfred Wernam Canning (21 February 1860 – 22 May 1936) was an Australian surveyor. He is best known as the originator of the Canning Stock Route in Western Australia, a cattle track running 1,850 kilometres (1,150 mi) through remote desert country between Halls Creek and Wiluna. He also surveyed the route for the inaugural rabbit-proof fence.

== Early life ==
Canning was born on 21 February 1860 in Campbellfield, Victoria. He was the son of Lucy (née Mason) and William Canning, a farmer. He was educated at Carlton College in Melbourne before joining the New South Wales Lands Department as a cadet in the survey branch. Canning was appointed as a licensed surveyor in 1882. He was stationed for periods in Bega, Cooma, and Bathurst.

== Western Australia ==
In 1893, during the Western Australian gold rush, Canning moved to Western Australia and joined the Department of Lands and Surveys. He was initially stationed in the state's south and "soon proved himself a first-class bushman and reliable surveyor".

In 1901 a royal commission resulted in Canning being commissioned to survey a route for a barrier fence across the State. Construction of the fence, known as the No. 1 Rabbit Proof Fence was completed in 1907. When completed it was the longest line of unbroken fence in the world.

=== Canning Stock Route ===
Canning is best known for surveying a stock route for bringing cattle 1,500 kilometres (930 mi) overland from the Kimberley district to the goldfields in 1906 and 1907. He returned the following year to commence construction of 51 wells which were set one days march (20 kilometres or 12 miles) apart to feed travelling livestock. The route was completed in 1910 and runs from Halls Creek to Wiluna.

Canning received a hero's welcome on his return to Perth, however his cook Edward Blake alleged the party had ill-treated Aboriginals, coerced Aboriginal men to locate water by force feeding them salt, destroyed water holes and kidnapped Aboriginal women for sex. After Premier Newton Moore failed to act on his claims Blake took them to the newspapers which prompted Moore to call a Royal Commission.

"It was necessary at times to use chains on our guides but we padded them to make sure they did not chafe the men's necks...they were happy with the arrangement."
—Evidence given before the Royal Commission by surveyor Hubert Trotman

The Commissioner of police admitted that police were forced to chain the guides due to their unwillingness to join the expedition. The continued chaining was justified on the grounds that they would have run off jeopardising the expedition. After three weeks of questions and replies the Royal Commission exonerated the expedition members of all charges.

In 1929 at the age of 68, Canning was commissioned to complete a restoration of the wells.

== Personal life and legacy ==
The Canning Stock Route and the Federal Division of Canning are named after him.

He died in Perth in 1936 and was buried at Karrakatta Cemetery. A public collection was started to raise funds for a memorial to Canning but the memorial was never built at that time. However a memorial was made in the 1950s.

The species Hemichoanella canningi is named in honour of Canning.
