= Canning Stock Route =

Track in Western Australia

Canning Stock Route CSR Western Australia
- Route relative to Kumpupintil Lake
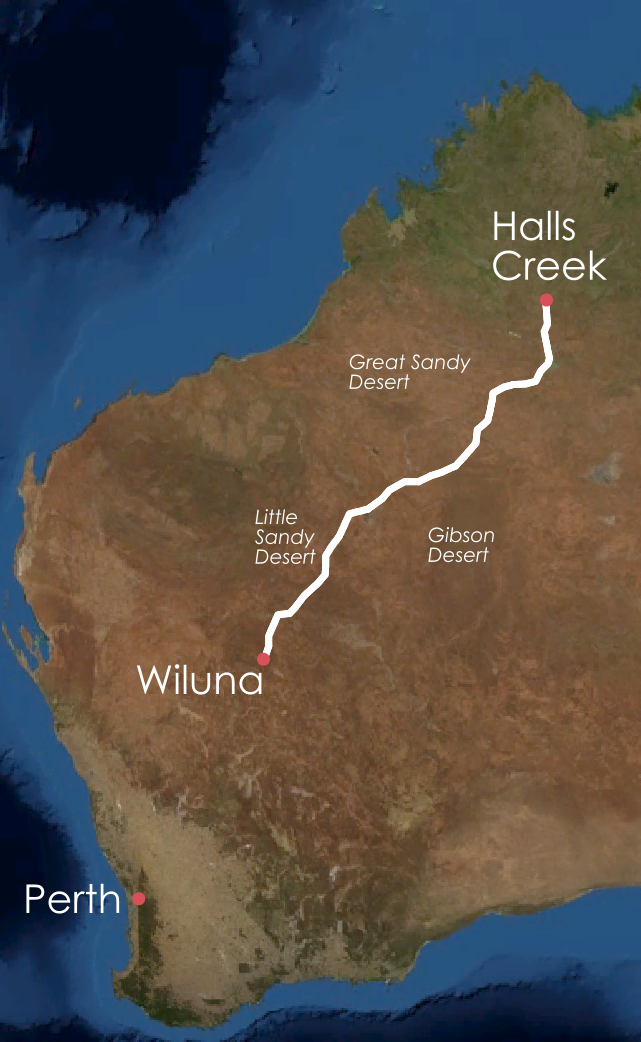
- The Canning Stock Route runs from Halls Creek in the Kimberley region of Western Australia to Wiluna.
- Coordinates: 18°19′27.98″S 127°33′16.74″E (north east end); 26°35′52.916″S 120°13′26.055″E (south west end)

General information
- Type: Track
- Length: 1,850 km (1,150 mi)
- Opened: 1910

Major junctions
- north east end: Great Northern Highway (National Highway 1), Halls Creek
- Tanami Road (Northern Territory State Route 5); Jenkins Track and Wapet Road (Kidson Track); Talawana Track; Bridal Face Road
- south west end: Goldfields Highway, Wiluna

Location(s)
- via: Billiluna (Mindibungu), Kunawarritji, Kutkabubba

Restrictions
- General: Not maintained.; Requires substantial planning.; Requires convoy of well-equipped four-wheel-drive vehicles.; Practical during cool season only.
- Permits: Permits required prior to travel. Virtually all of the Canning Stock Route traverses native title lands.
- Fuel supply: Parnngurr Community near well 22.; Fuel drop point near well 23.; Kunawarritji Community near well 33.

The Canning Stock Route is a track that runs from Halls Creek in the Kimberley region of Western Australia to Wiluna in the mid-west region. With a total distance of around 1,850 km (1,150 mi) it is claimed to be the longest historic stock route in the world.

A 1928 Royal Commission into the price of beef in Western Australia led to the repair of the wells and the re-opening of the stock route. Around 20 droves took place between 1931 and 1959 when the final droving run was completed.

The Canning Stock Route is now a popular but challenging four-wheel drive trek typically taking 10 to 20 days to complete. A few adventurers have traversed the track on foot, by bicycle, motorcycle and in two-wheel drive vehicles.

There are two small settlements on the track where fuel and other supplies may be obtained; Kunawarritji, approximately 1,000 kilometres (620 mi) north of Wiluna, and Billiluna, 173 kilometres (107 mi) south of Halls Creek.

In March 2020, the route was closed to tourists due to the COVID-19 pandemic. It was reopened on 14 June 2022.

== History ==
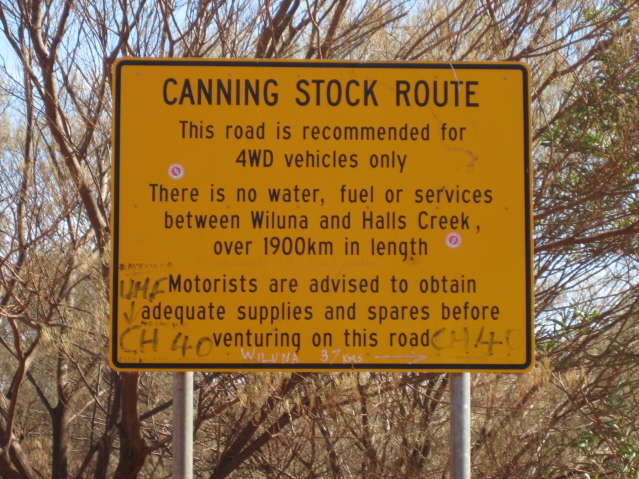
Roadside sign at the southern end of the Canning Stock Route, near Wiluna

In Western Australia at the beginning of the 20th century, east Kimberley cattlemen were looking for a way to traverse the western deserts of Australia with their cattle as a way to break a west Kimberley monopoly that controlled the supply of beef to Perth and the goldfields in the south of the state. East Kimberley cattle were infested with Boophilus ticks infected with a malaria-like parasitic disease called Babesiosis and were prohibited from being transported to southern markets by sea due to a fear that the ticks would survive the journey and spread. This gave west Kimberley cattlemen a monopoly on the beef trade and resulted in high prices.

With east Kimberley cattlemen keen to find a way to get their cattle to market, and the Government of Western Australia keen for competition to bring prices down, a 1905 proposal of a stock route through the desert was taken seriously. James Isdell, an east Kimberley pastoralist and member of the Western Australian Legislative Assembly, proposed the stock route arguing that ticks would not survive in the dry desert climate on the trip south.

=== Surveying the route ===
==== Calvert and Carnegie expeditions ====
The route, which crossed the territories of nine different Aboriginal language groups, had been explored previously in 1896 by the Calvert Expedition led by Lawrence Wells and again later that year by the Carnegie Expedition led by David Carnegie. Two members of the Calvert Expedition perished of thirst and the Carnegie Expedition suffered considerable hardships with camels dying after eating poisonous grass and a member of the party accidentally shooting himself dead. Carnegie investigated the possibility of a stock route and concluded that the route was "too barren and destitute of vegetation" and was impractical.

Wells and Carnegie both mistreated Aboriginals they encountered on their expeditions, including by tying them up and forcing them to find water. Carnegie is also believed to have fed them salt, and he was later publicly criticised for this. Evidence supports that Alfred Canning had read both the Calvert and Carnegie expedition accounts to find out about the country (both described the terrain as "extremely difficult") and the use of Aboriginal people to find water, an example Canning followed during his own expedition.

==== Canning survey ====
After it was determined that ticks could not survive a desert crossing, the government endorsed James Isdell's scheme and funded a survey to find a stock route that would cross the Great Sandy Desert, the Little Sandy Desert and the Gibson Desert. Alfred Canning, a surveyor with the Western Australian Department of Lands and Surveys, was appointed to survey the stock route.

Canning's task was to find a route through 1850 kilometres of desert, from Wiluna in the mid west to the Kimberley in the north. He needed to find significant water sources – enough for up to 800 head of cattle, a day's walk apart – where wells could be dug, and enough good grazing land to sustain this number of cattle during the journey south.

In 1906, with a team of 23 camels, two horses, and eight men, Canning surveyed the route completing the difficult journey from Wiluna to Halls Creek in less than six months. On 1 November 1906, shortly after arriving in Halls Creek, Canning sent a telegram to Perth stating that the finished route would "be about the best watered stock route in [the] Colony". Canning was forced to delay his return journey because of an early wet season in the Kimberley that year. The survey party left Halls Creek in late January 1907 and arrived back in Wiluna in early July 1907. During the 14-month expedition, they had trekked about 4,000 km (2,500 mi), relying on Aboriginal guides to help them find water.

Canning had always planned to rely on Aboriginal guides to help him find water and had taken neck chains and handcuffs supplied to him by the Wiluna police to make sure local "guides" stayed as long as he needed them. In order to gain assistance in locating water along the route, Canning captured several Martu men, chained them by the neck and forced them to lead his party to native water sources (soaks). As many soaks were sacred, the Martu may have misdirected the explorers away from these, resulting in the eventual stock route winding more than would otherwise have been necessary.

=== Royal Commission into treatment of Aboriginal people ===
After the Canning survey party returned to Perth, Canning's use of Aboriginal guides came under scrutiny. The expedition's cook, Edward Blake, accused Canning of mistreating many of the Aboriginal people they met during the survey expedition. Blake objected to the use of chains and criticised the "party's 'immoral' pursuit of Aboriginal women, the theft and 'unfair' trade of Aboriginal property and the destruction of native waters". Blake was concerned that the planned wells would prevent Aboriginal people accessing water.

Blake's complaints led to a Royal Commission into the treatment of natives by the Canning exploration party.

Blake was unable to prove many of his claims, but Canning did admit to the use of chains. Kimberley explorer and the first Premier of Western Australia, John Forrest, dismissed Canning's actions by claiming that all explorers behaved in this manner. Despite condemning the use of chains, the Royal Commission accepted the survey party's actions as "reasonable" and Canning and his men were exonerated of all charges, including "immorality with native women" and stealing property. The Royal Commission approved the immediate commencement of the stock route's construction. Canning was appointed to lead the construction party.

=== Construction ===
Canning left Perth in March 1908, along with 30 men, 70 camels, four wagons, 100 tonnes of food and equipment and 267 goats (for milk and meat), and travelled the route again to commence the construction of well heads and water troughs at the 54 water sources identified by his earlier expedition. He arrived back in Wiluna in April 1910 having completed the last of 48 wells and bringing the total cost of the route to £22000 (2010: A$2.6 million).

Thirty-seven of the wells were built on or near existing Aboriginal waters and were constructed in the European tradition, which made many of them inaccessible to Aboriginal people. Pulling the heavy buckets up from the bottom of the wells required the strength of three men or use of a camel. Consequently, many Aboriginal people were injured or died while trying to access the water, either falling in and drowning or breaking bones on the windlass handle. In reprisal, buckets were cut off or timber set on fire, and by 1917 Aboriginal people had vandalised or dismantled approximately half of the wells in a bid to reclaim access to the water or to prevent drovers from using the wells. Canning's party had constructed the wells with the forced help of one of the Aboriginal peoples whose land the route traversed, the Martu.

Canning produced a detailed map of the stock route, Plan of Wiluna–Kimberley stock route exploration (showing positions of wells constructed 1908–9 and 10) on which he also recorded his observations of the land and water sources along the route. The map has become a symbol of Australia's pioneering history.

=== Using the stock route ===
==== First droving runs ====
Commercial droving along the stock route began in 1910. The first few droves were of small groups of horses – the first started out with 42 horses of which only nine survived the journey.

The first mob of bullocks to attempt to use the stock route set out in January 1911; however, the party of three drovers, George Shoesmith, James Thompson and an Aboriginal stockman who was known as "Chinaman", were killed by Aboriginals at Well 37. Thomas Cole discovered their bodies later in 1911 during his successful drove along the stock route. In September 1911, Sergeant R.H. Pilmer led a police "punitive expedition" to find the culprits and ensure the stock route remained open. The police made no arrests, but the expedition was considered a success after Pilmer acknowledged killing at least 10 Aboriginals.

On 7 September 1911 it was reported that the first mob of cattle to traverse the entire length of the stock route had successfully arrived in Wiluna. The cattle had apparently gained condition on the long drove.

The stock route was closed at some time prior to 1925. In 1925 the Billiluna Pastoral Company requested that it be reopened. The state government refused saying that it had fallen into disrepair from disuse as a result of stockmen being attacked by Aboriginals. The government claimed it would cost £5,625 and take six months to repair and refused to consider the expenditure at that time.

Despite police protection, drovers were afraid to use the track and it was rarely used for almost 20 years. Between 1911 and 1931, only eight mobs of cattle were driven along the Canning Stock Route.

==== Reopening of the stock route ====
A 1928 Royal Commission into the price of beef in Western Australia led to the re-opening of the stock route. In 1929, William Snell was commissioned to repair the wells and found that the only wells undamaged were the ones that Aboriginal people could use. Snell criticised the construction of Canning's wells because they were difficult for Aboriginal people to use safely, and he put the destruction of the wells down to the anger and frustration people felt at being unable to access traditional water sources. Snell personally committed to making the wells more accessible to Aboriginal people:

Natives cannot draw water from the Canning Stock Route wells. It takes three strong white men to land a bucket of water. It is beyond the natives power to land a bucket. They let go the handle [and] some times escape with their life but get an arm and head broken in the attempt to get away. To heal the wounds so severely inflicted and [as] a safeguard against the natives destroying the wells again I equipped the wells ... so that the native can draw water from the wells without destroying them.—William Snell

Snell started work on the refurbishment of the wells, fitting some with ladders for easier access, but he abandoned the work after well 35. Reports vary that he either ran out of materials or the desert became too much for him.

In 1930, Alfred Canning (then aged 70) was commissioned to complete the work. While Snell had encountered no hostility, Canning had trouble with the Aboriginals from the start but successfully completed the commission in 1931.

With these improvements, the route was used on a more regular basis although in total, it would only be used around 20 times between 1931 and 1959 when the last droving run was completed. None of the larger station owners used the track as it was found that only 600 head of cattle could be supported at a time, which was 200 less than was estimated when first completed. As Carnegie had accurately reported in 1896, the track was impractical for cattle drives.

During the Second World War the track was upgraded at considerable expense in case it was needed for an evacuation of the north if Australia was invaded. Including horse drives there were only 37 recorded drives between 1910 and the last run in 1959.

== Traverses ==
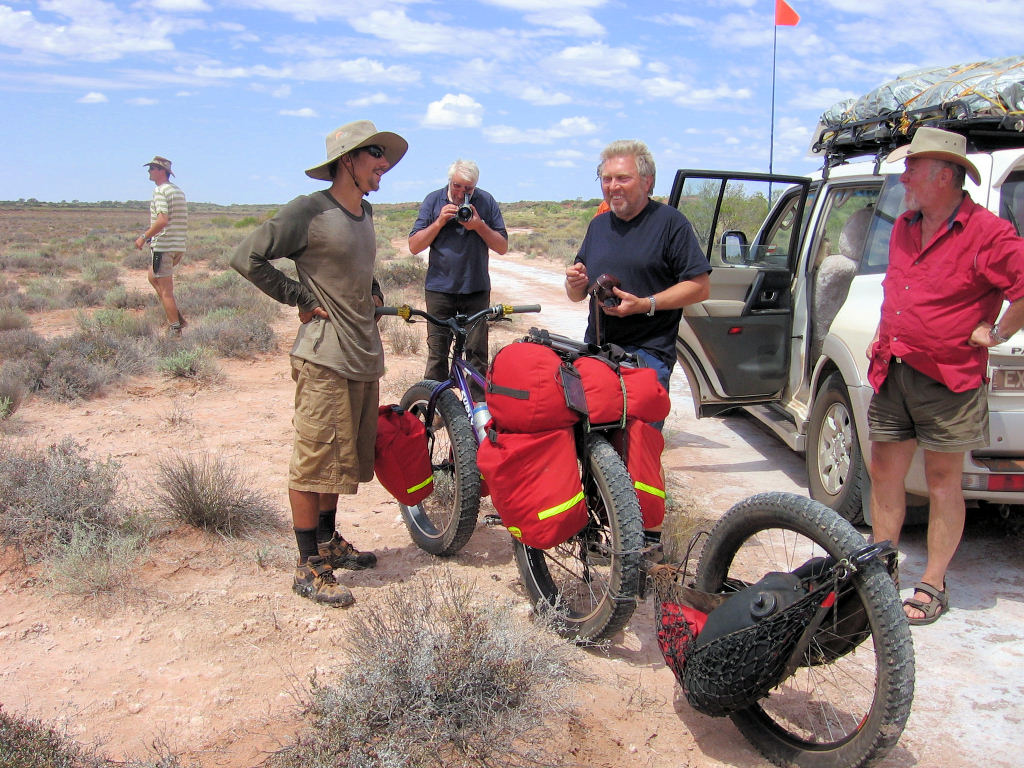
Jakub Postrzygacz with his special fat-bike on the Canning Stock Route near Kumpupintil Lake

In the 1950s horses became scarce in the Kimberley as widespread losses were caused by "walkabout poison". This led to the stock route being used to drove horses north from around the Norseman area where they were sold to the stations. Wally Dowling, a drover who had made nine droves along the stock route took what was probably the last group of horses northwards along the route in September 1951. In 1968 the entire length of the track was driven for the first time by surveyors Russell Wenholz and David Chudleigh, and Noel Kealley.

In 1972, before the route was regularly negotiated in four-wheel drives, ambitious attempts to complete it on foot took place. A New Zealander, Murray Rankin, and two English brothers, John and Peter Waterfall, fashioned homemade trolleys from bicycle wheels and metal tubing, and began their attempt starting from Wiluna in early June 1972. First John and then Peter turned back, but Rankin continued to Kumpupintil Lake, then called Lake Disappointment, before being forced to abandon the attempt. The remains of one of their trolleys lie 19 kilometres (12 mi) north of well 15.

In 1973 Rankin tried again, this time starting from Old Halls Creek with Englishman John Foulsham. This time they had professionally built trolleys with motor-cycle wheels. The walk began on 1 June. Soon after reaching Godfrey's Tank they were unable to pull the trolleys over the high sand hills. They left them and walked on to Lake Tobin and there abandoned the attempt and returned to Halls Creek.

Three years later, in 1976, Rankin achieved his ambition to walk the stock route. After driving the route in a Land Rover and establishing food depots along the way, he set out from Halls Creek on 12 July 1976 with three other bushwalkers, Ralph Barraclough, Kathy Burman and Rex Shaw. Barraclough turned back after becoming ill, but the others completed the journey in just under three months.

In 1974, the first motorcycle crossing from Wiluna to Billiluna was achieved by Paul Allardyce, Colin Fitzgerald and Andy Bowman. They had air support flown by John Fitzgerald and Phil Schubert.

In 1977, the first commercial tour completed the drive.

During the 1980s fuel dumps were created and adventurous travellers became interested in the history of the track and the challenge to drive it.

In 1985, a Beach Buggy driven by Gordon Hayes, became the first two-wheel drive vehicle to complete the CSR under its own power. A support crew carried the fuel.

In 1991, a Citroën 2CV, driven by Rupert Backford and Mathew Rawlings, completed the CSR with a support crew towing the car over many of the dunes.

In 1993 long-distance walker Drew Kettle walked the route.

In 1997 Robin Rishworth cycled, with the aid of food drops, in just less than 27 days, and is considered to be the first modern day solo cyclist.

In 2004 Kate Leeming, as part of a longer trek, completed the route with the aid of a support vehicle.

In 2005 Jakub Postrzygacz became the first person to traverse the entire track without either support or the use of food drops, travelling alone by fatbike for 33 days. With large tyres and a single-wheel trailer, he carried all his food with him and replenished his water at wells.

In 2016 Sam Mitchell towed an array of solar panels behind his fatbike. This was the first time a solar powered vehicle traversed the complete length of the route.

== Present ==
=== Tourism ===
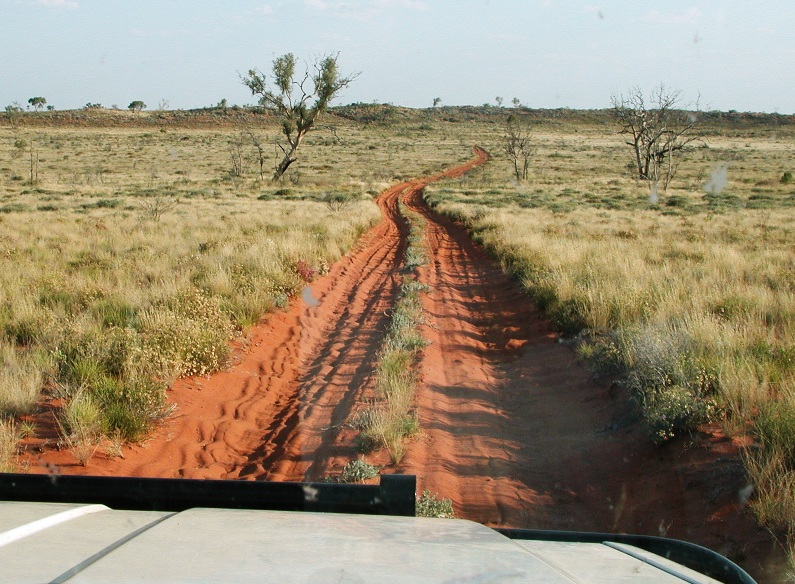
Canning Stock Route four-wheel drive track crossing the Little Sandy Desert

The Canning Stock route is considered one of the world's great four-wheel drive adventures. Apart from keeping the track open, the route is not maintained. Some wells have been restored but others are in ruins and unusable. While quite a few travellers successfully make the trip, it still requires substantial planning and a convoy of well-equipped four-wheel drives or equivalent vehicles, and is only practical during the cooler months. Fuel drops typically need to be organised in advance and the 1,850-kilometre (1,150 mi) trip will take two to three weeks. Fuel is now available at Kunawarritji Community near well 33 and Parnngurr Community near well 22.

The Kuju Wangka committee of the Yanunijarra Aboriginal Corporation closed the Canning Stock Route to tourists in March 2020 because of the COVID-19 pandemic. They reopened it on 14 June 2022.

== Aboriginal perspective ==
The history of the Canning Stock Route has been well documented from the colonial perspective – accounts of European explorers, drovers, prospectors and law enforcers – but increasingly the Aboriginal history of the track is also being recognised, and Aboriginal people are keen to have their story told.

We wanna tell you fellas 'bout things been happening in the past that hasn't been recorded, what old people had in their head. No pencil and paper. The white man history has been told and it's today in the book. But our history is not there properly. We've got to tell 'em through our paintings.

— Clifford Brooks, Wiluna, 2006

Archaeologists now believe that the Western Desert has been occupied for around 30,000 years. For Aboriginal people, the history of the stock route is therefore part of a much older story. They have recorded this story, including the changes brought about by the construction of the stock route, through oral and artistic traditions.

The building of the stock route impacted on the cultural and social life of the more than 15 Aboriginal language groups that have a "cultural, familial or historical connection to the route and its custodians, or to sites along the major Dreaming tracks or songlines". Some Dreaming tracks exist within the Country of a single language group, but others cross the territory of many groups and the major Dreaming tracks often mark the territorial boundaries of the Countries they cross. The stock route, and the people and stock it brought with it, inevitably interrupted traditional patterns of movement and connection to Country.

While many Aboriginal people made a determined effort to avoid contact with the people the stock route brought into their Country, the route became a path out of the desert for others. At different times, and for different reasons, people moved away to the outskirts of towns, to pastoral stations and church missions. Many found work with the drovers using the stock route and successful droves relied on the skill of these Aboriginal stockmen and women. Others left looking for more reliable sources of food and water, especially in times of drought, while some were drawn to the changes taking place around the edges of the desert or motivated by a desire to join family already living elsewhere.

=== Rock art project ===
There are a large number of Aboriginal rock paintings and carvings along the stock route. As more and more people visit the area each year, custodians of the Western Desert have become concerned about the protection and management of Aboriginal sites along the route. In 2007, researchers from the Australian National University began a project to draw up the first comprehensive plan of management for the entire Canning Stock Route. The project aimed to develop a series of modules to inform detailed guides and signs for visitors, while also protecting sites that have special significance for Indigenous peoples.

=== The Canning Stock Route Project ===
The Canning Stock Route has a strong connection to the story of Aboriginal art in the Western Desert. When droving along the stock route led to many family groups dispersing to the edges of the desert, communities were established in missions, towns, stations and settlements, and it was here that contemporary painting movements flourished.

In 2006, Western Australian independent cultural organisation Form instigated a contemporary arts and cultural initiative to "explore the complex history of the Canning Stock Route through the prism of contemporary Aboriginal art". Partnerships among nine art centres and communities with direct connections to the stock route region were set up. The project involved several years of research by Form in collaboration with Aboriginal artists and their art centres and organisations.

A major part of the project's program of bush work was a six-week, 1,850-kilometre (1,150 mi) desert journey from Wiluna to Billiluna. During this trip, and in follow-up workshops and other trips, 80 artists created a collection of paintings, contemporary cultural objects and documentary material.

The historical and artistic value of the project was recognised in 2008 when the National Museum of Australia decided to acquire the entire Canning Stock Route Project collection. The language groups identified during the project, as being crossed by the stock route, or adjacent to it are identified as: (from the south)

Kiyajarra
Putijarra
Kartujarra
Manyjilyjarra
Warnman
Wangkajunga
Nyangajarra
Juwaliny
Walmajarri
Kukatja
Djaru

=== The Canning Stock Route Collection ===
The National Museum of Australia acquired a significant collection of artworks and other material collected by the 60 artists who travelled along the Canning Stock Route on a six-week return to country trip in 2007 as part of the Canning Stock Route Project. The Canning Stock Route collection includes over 100 works of art, 120 oral histories, historical research, social and cultural data, artists' biographies, 20,000 photographs and over 200 hours of film footage.

One of the key aims of the Canning Stock Route Project was the development of a travelling exhibition. The National Museum of Australia committed to assisting Form to develop an exhibition. Yiwarra Kuju (One Road) – The Canning Stock Route, a joint initiative between the National Museum of Australia and Form, was held at the museum from July 2010 to January 2011. The exhibition used works of art and stories to tell the story of the stock route's impact on Aboriginal people from an Aboriginal perspective. When it closed in January 2011, Yiwarra Kuju – The Canning Stock Route had been the most successful exhibition in the history of the Museum, with over 120,000 visitors.

== Journey distances ==
The nearest capital city to the Wiluna starting point of the route is Perth, 958 km (595 mi) south west of Wiluna by road. Then to return to Perth via sealed roads from Halls Creek it is 2,857 km (1,775 mi); including the Canning route this gives a total driving distance of 5,665 km (3,520 mi).

== See also ==
- Highways in Australia
- List of highways in Western Australia
