= Louisa Downs Station =

Pastoral lease in Western Australia

Coordinates: 18°42′33″S 126°42′46″E

Location in Western Australia

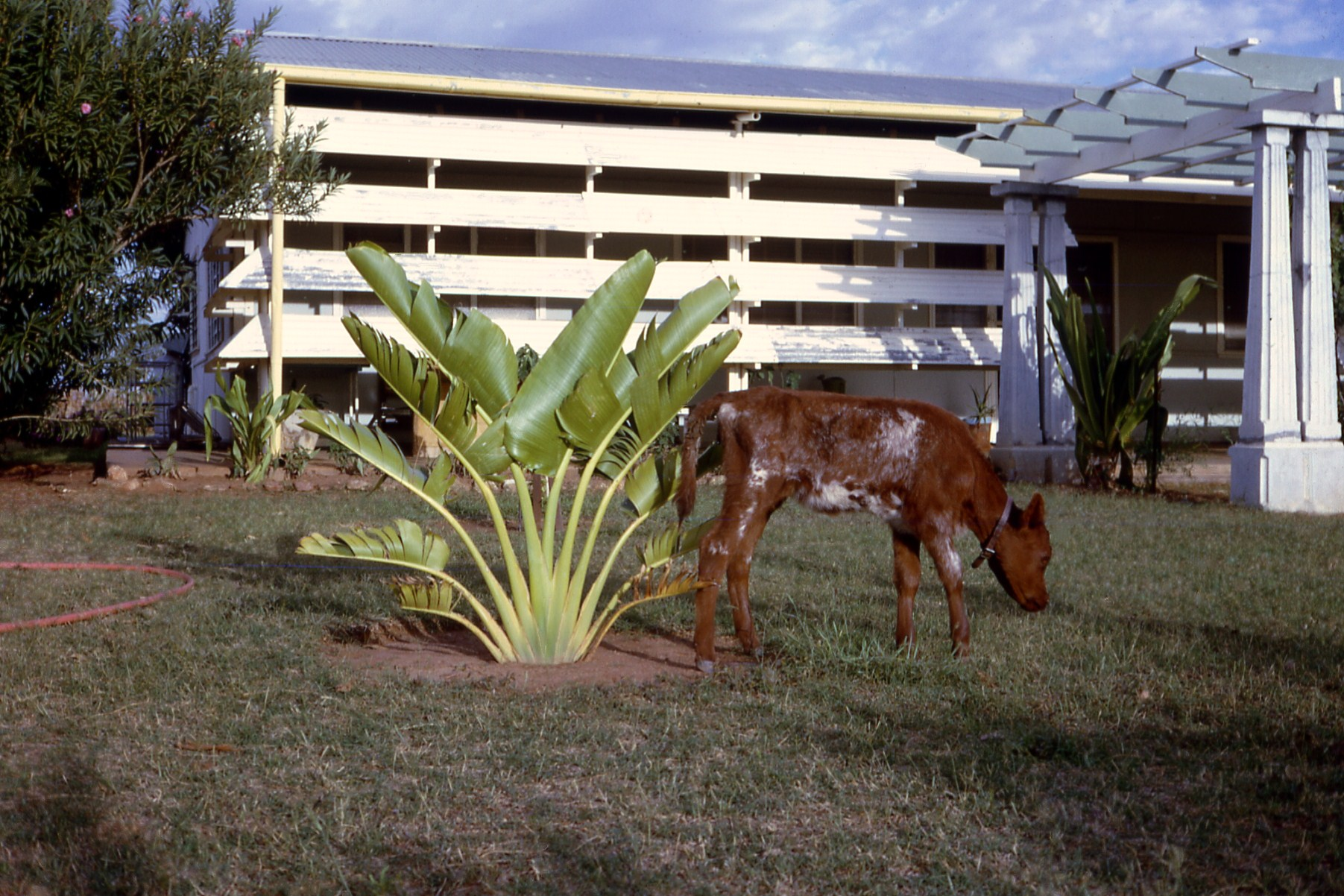
Louisa Downs homestead in 1968

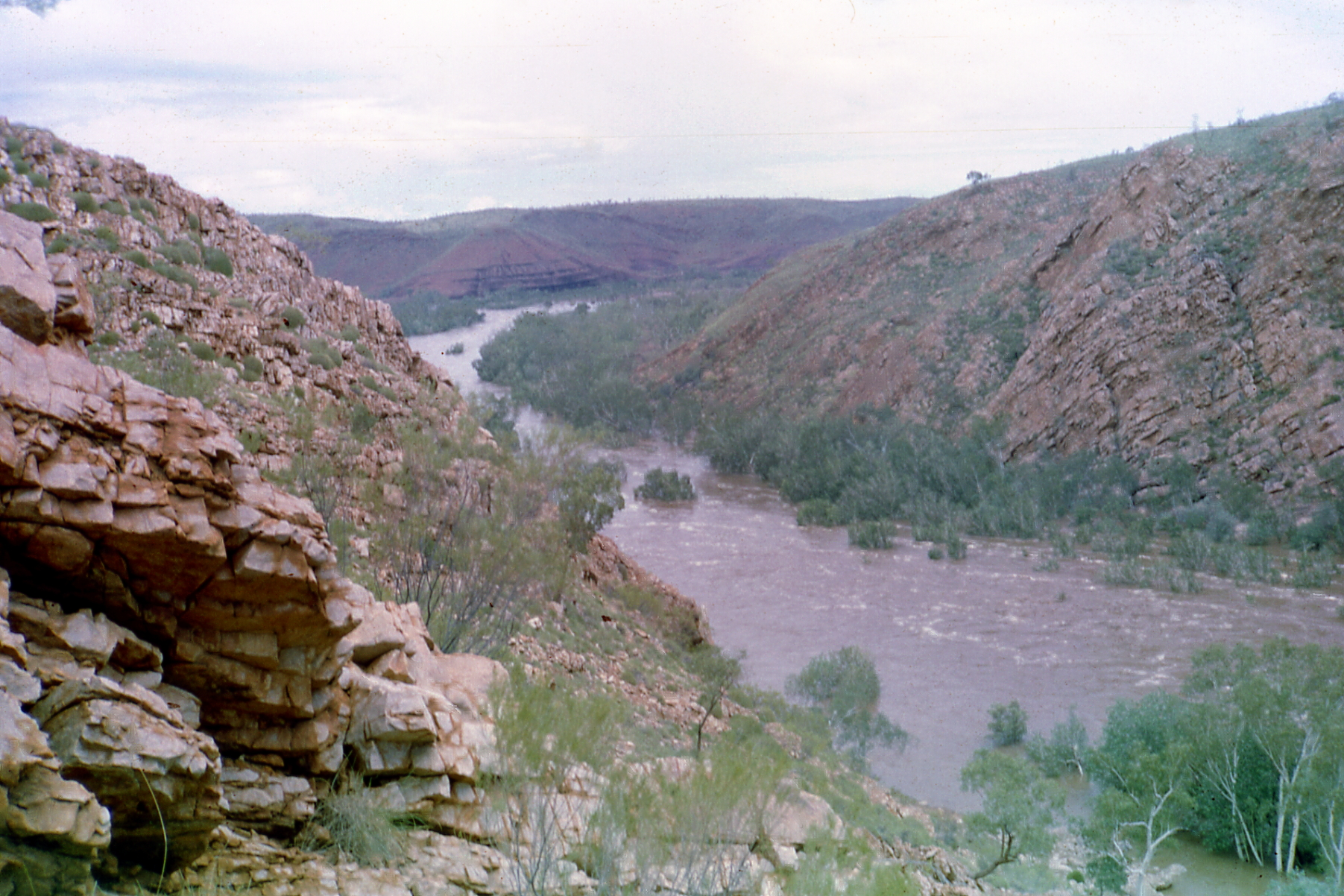
The Margaret River in flood at Me No Savvy

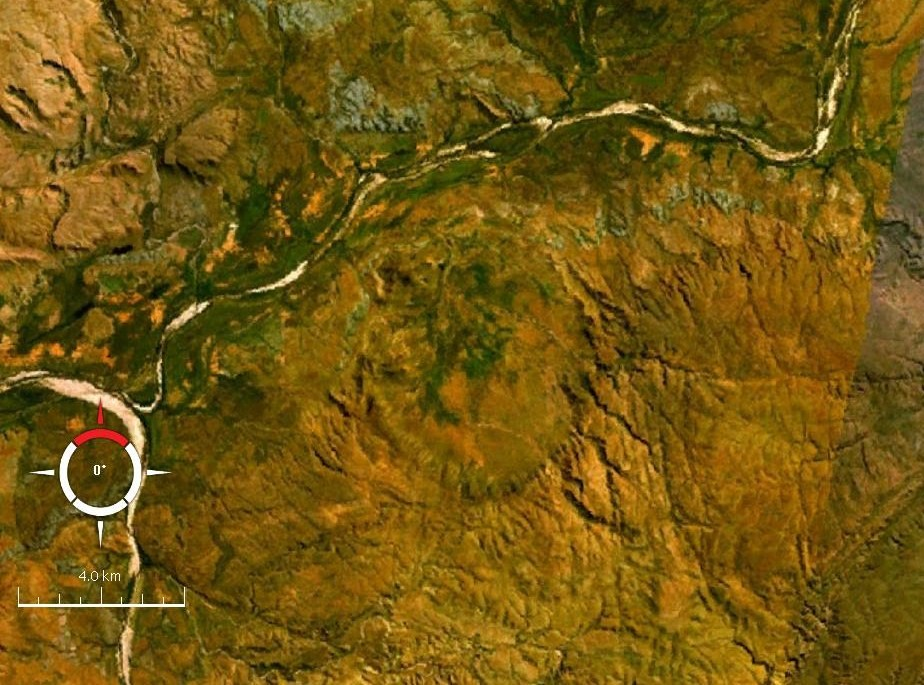
Meteorite crater on Louisa Downs

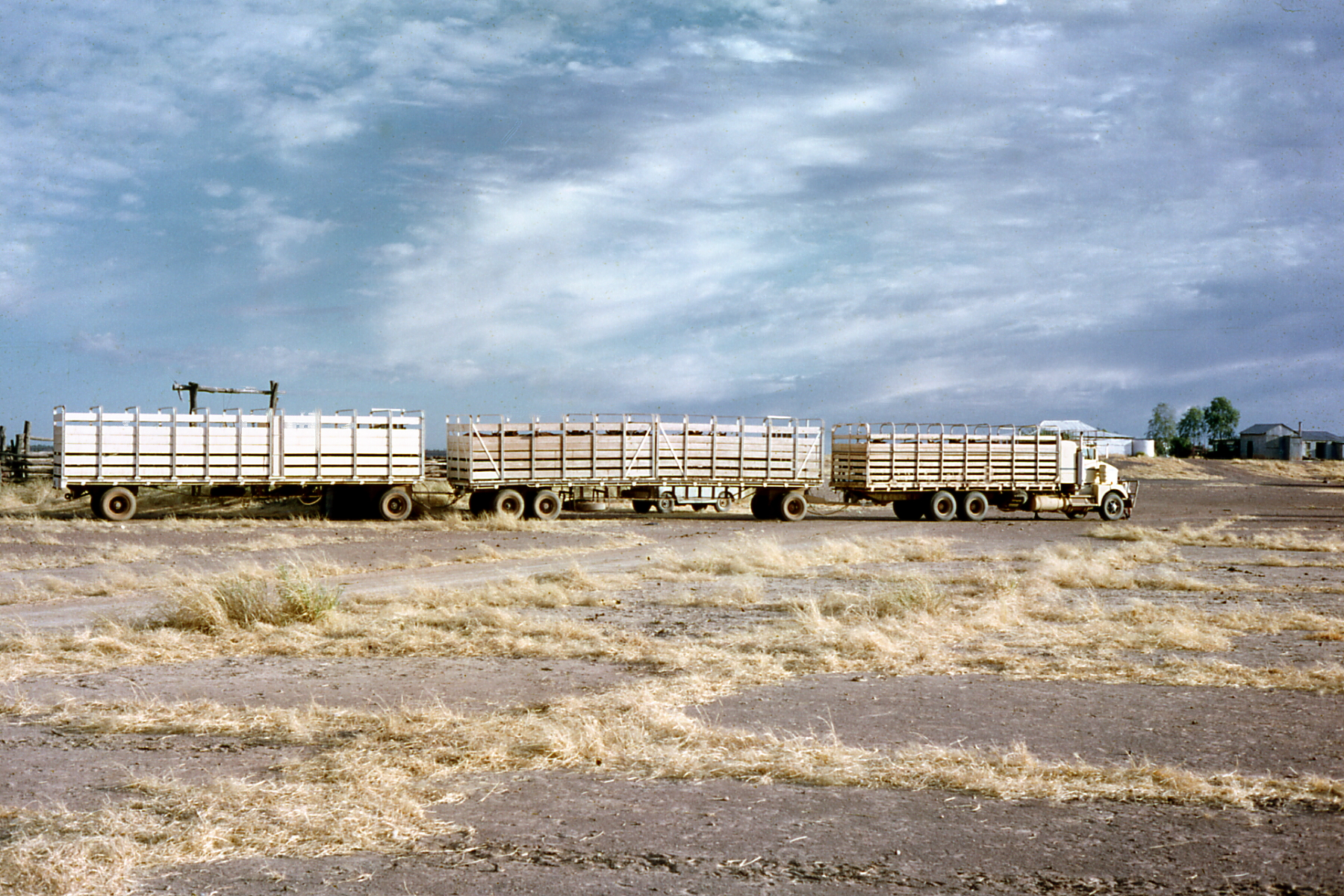
Early cattle road trains at Louisa

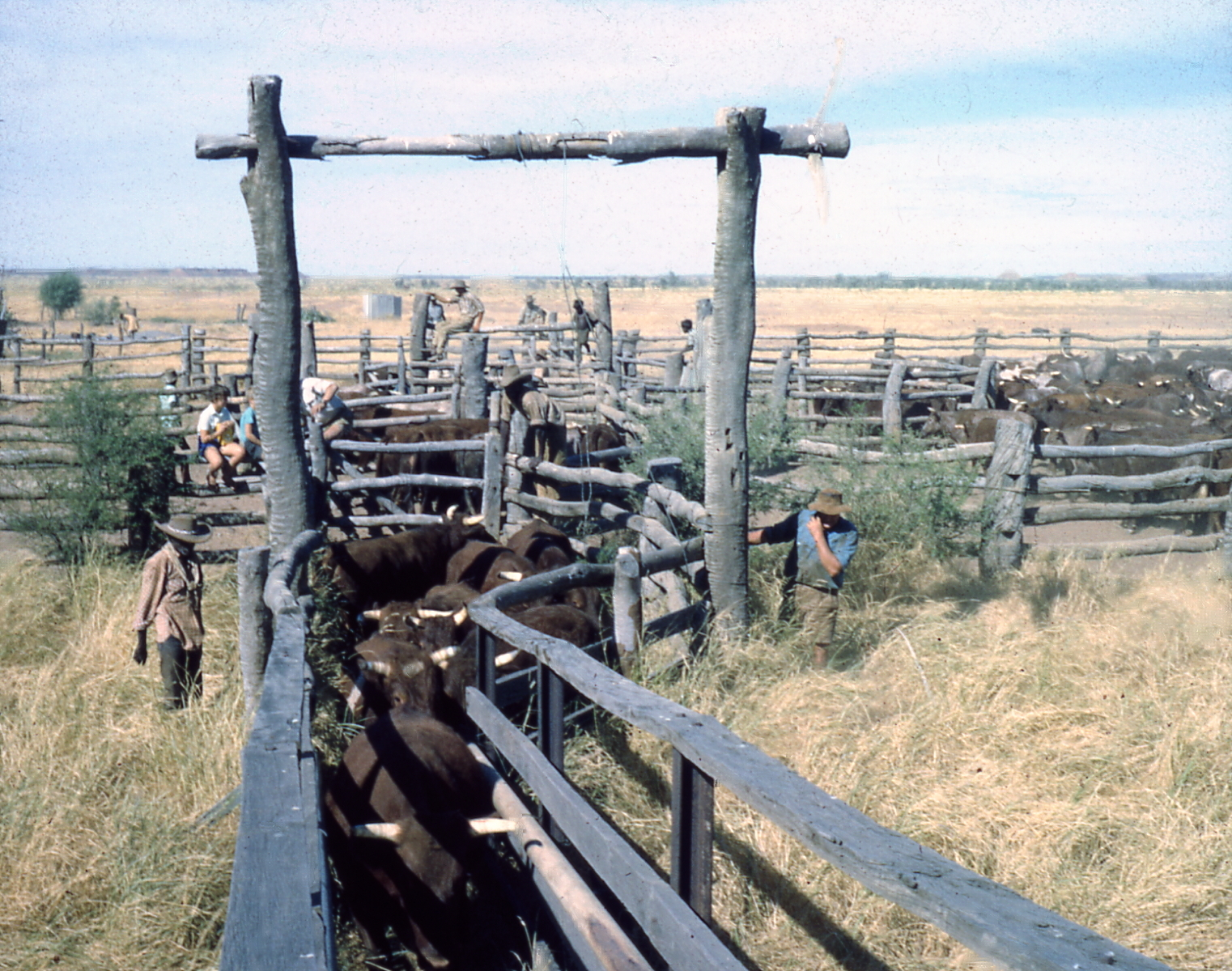
Loading cattle at Louisa homestead in 1967

Louisa Downs, also commonly just referred to as "Louisa", is a large cattle station midway between Fitzroy Crossing and Halls Creek in the Kimberley region in Western Australia.

== Description ==
Originally of about 1,000,000 acres (4,000 km^{2}) is size, the station encompasses a significant section of the south eastern end of the Wunaamin-Miliwundi Ranges and the southern boundary is on the northern end of the Great Sandy Desert.

In 1962 when the station was purchased by Karl Stein it was combined with the neighbouring station, Bohemia Downs, now known as Kupartiya, and also nearly 1,000,000 acres in size, and run as one enterprise with approximately 17,000 head of cattle.

The Margaret River enters the station on its eastern boundary near the junction of the Mary River, then runs in a north-westerly direction between the Lubbock and Kuniandi Ranges and enters the Mueller Ranges at "Me No Savy" in a wide gorge, the site of a potential irrigation dam.

The homestead is located on the banks of the Margaret River near Mount Frank.

A significant meteorite crater (astrobleme) known locally as Goat Paddock Pocket is located in the northern part of the station near the junction of the O'Donnell and Margaret River in an area known as "Bluebush".

The combined station has since been broken up into four stations and the original Louisa Downs has now been returned to its original owners, the Cox family.

== The Cox family ==
The station is notable for its association with the Cox family, who were early settlers in the region. William Cox, aka Billy, died at Louisa in 1944 and is buried in a grave just to the west of the homestead. Billy moved from Noonkanbah Station some time in the 1930s with his young son Fred.

Freddie lived almost his entire life there, died in 1991, and is buried next to his father.

== Notable events ==
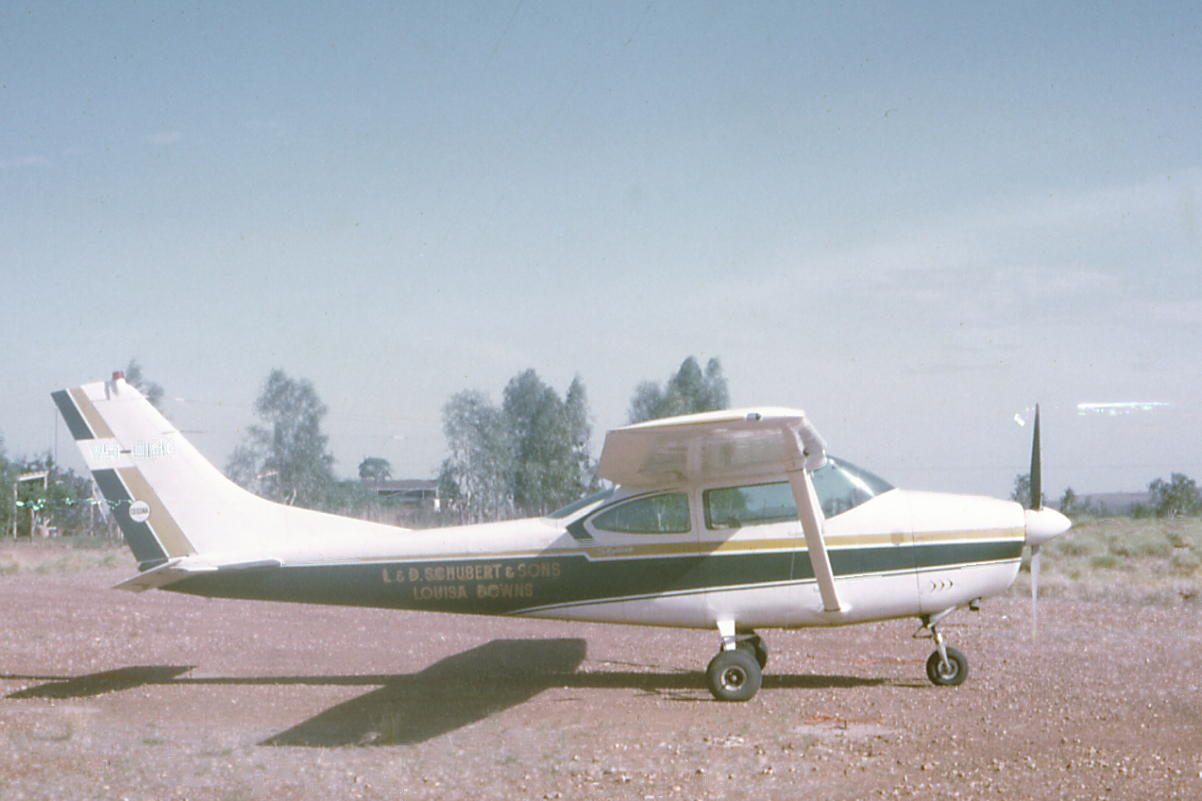
Cessna used by Les Schubert in 1968 for aerial mustering on Louisa

During an influenza epidemic in the Kimberley in 1934, 14 Aboriginal people died from the disease on Louisa, out of the 129 fatalities overall.

Leslie Arthur Schubert, who purchased Louisa Downs along with the neighbouring Bohemia Downs in December 1966, was one of the pioneers of aerial mustering at Louisa in 1967 using Cessna 182 fixed wing aircraft and much smaller teams of Aboriginal stockmen.

Communications between the aircraft and the stockmen on the ground were very unreliable, using 27 MHz citizens band "walkie talkie" radios. The radios often failed or were broken through rough use by the stockmen while on horseback. Handwritten notes on strips of toilet paper were then dropped to the white overseers who accompanied these teams, as the Aboriginal stockmen were largely illiterate.

The development of this method of mustering was very effective and the numbers of wild cattle that were able to be mustered rose dramatically. This enabled the culling of many of the lower quality wild bulls, leading eventually to improved blood lines.

The Bluebush area was originally only accessible by horse or foot along the dry bed of the Margaret River and all supplies for the muster had to be taken in by pack horse. In 1968 Les Schubert surveyed a route through the ranges and along the bed of the Margaret River and constructed a rugged track into the area.

Shortly after, he cleared a 300 metre airstrip near the junction of the Margaret and O'Donnell Rivers at "Junction Yard" using a small front-end loader and manual labour. This airstrip enabled station staff and stores to be flown in, in less than 20 minutes from the homestead instead of a gruelling five hour drive in a Land Rover over rough station tracks.

Goat Paddock Pocket was used as a large holding yard for cattle during the annual muster in this area.

The Public Works Department set up a flow monitoring station on the Margaret River at the entrance of the gorge where it enters the Mueller Ranges, in 1966. Debate continues about the use of the Fitzroy as a water source for the south west of Western Australia.

In 2005, Department of Housing and Works received grants totalling A$281,300 to build airstrips and improve facilities to Royal Flying Doctor Service standard at Louisa Downs and other places in the Kimberley as part of the Regional Airports Development Scheme funding provided by the Gallop government.

A helicopter crashed in a gorge near Margaret River at the station boundary in 2012. The sole occupant, the pilot, was killed in the crash when the helicopter struck a rock face then plunged into the water below and was submerged.

== See also ==
- List of ranches and stations
- List of the largest stations in Australia
