= Kunawarritji Community =

Community in Western Australia

Kunawarritji
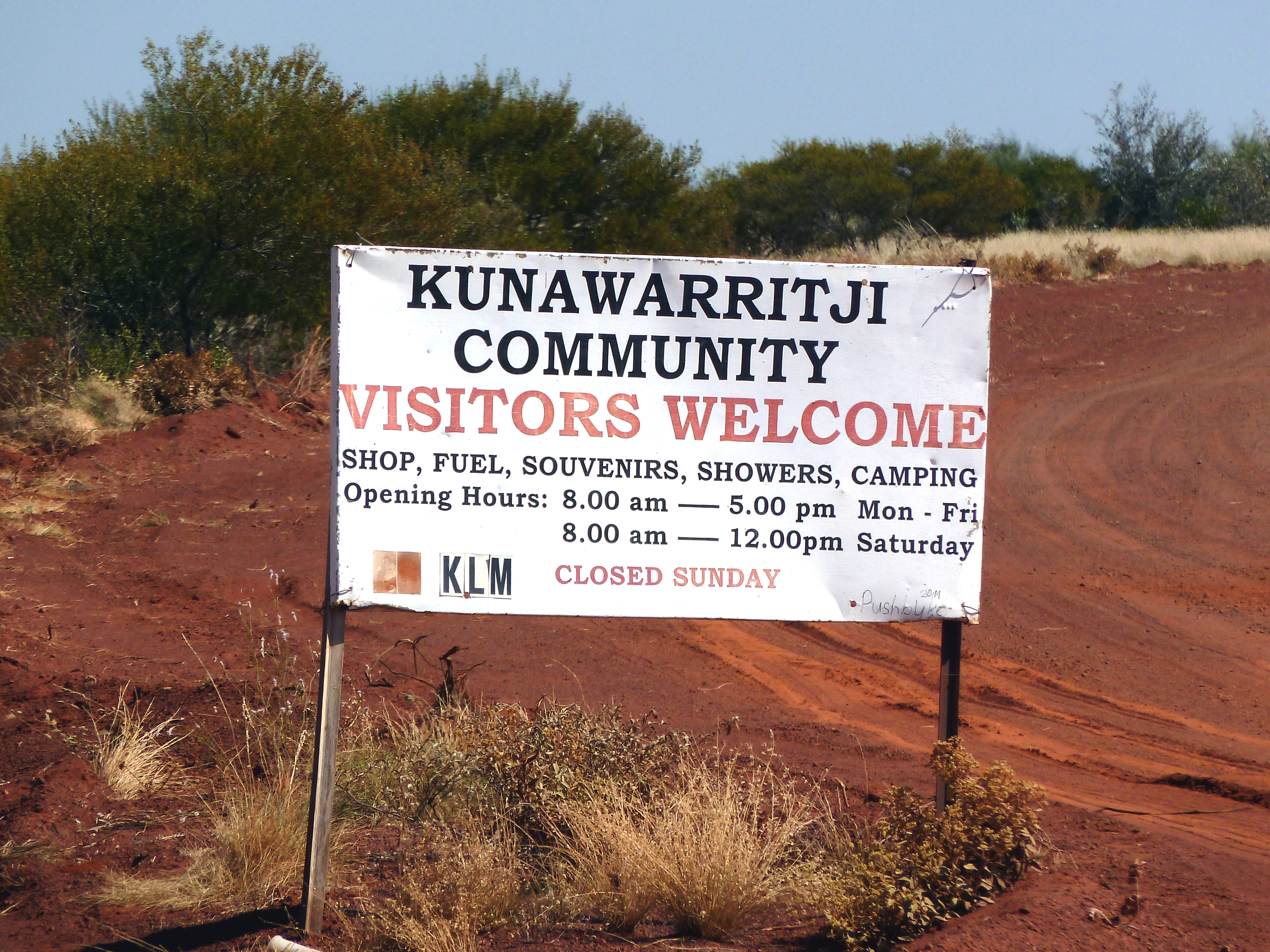
- Welcome information sign

- Coordinates: 22.299°0′S 124.721°0′E
- Country: Australia
- State: Western Australia
- LGA: Shire of East Pilbara
- Location: 530 km (330 mi) south east of Marble Bar

Population
  - Total: 76

Kunawarritji (also referred to as Well 33) is an Aboriginal community, located in the Pilbara region of Western Australia, within the Shire of East Pilbara on the Canning Stock Route.

== Background ==
The Kunawarritji settlement (5 kilometres north-west of Well 33) was established in the early 1980s by a group of Martu people from Punmu. The current population is made up primarily of Martu people, consisting of approximately 115 people. As the community is of cultural significance to all Martu people in the Western Desert, the population can increase up to 1000 during cultural business.

Punmu and Parnngurr are the other large Western Desert communities situated 165 km and 230 km west of Kunawarritji respectively. The Kunawarritji community frequently interacts with these and other communities in the area.

Fuel (diesel and Opal) and a wide range of supplies are available from the store.

== Native title ==
The community is covered by the determined Martu native title claim area (WC 96/78). A prescribed body corporate named the Western Desert Lands Aboriginal Corporation was registered for the Martu land on 17 July 2003. Future development at the community requires the authorisation of the prescribed body corporate.

== Governance ==
The community is managed by its incorporated body, the Kunawarritji Aboriginal Corporation, incorporated under the Aboriginal Councils and Associations Act 1976 on 30 May 1995.

== Town planning ==
Kunawarritji layout plan No.1 was endorsed by the community and Western Australian Planning Commission in 2004.
