= Kimberley Land Division =

Coordinates: 17°30′S 125°00′E

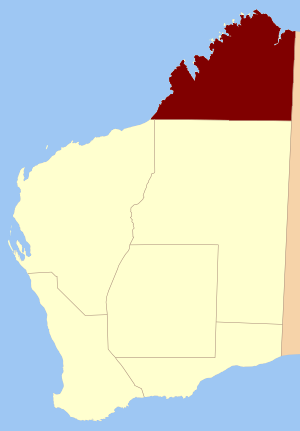
Location in Western Australia

Kimberley Land Division is one of five land divisions of Western Australia recognised in the Land Administration Act 1997. It occupies roughly the same area as the Kimberley region of the state.

== Location ==
Schedule 1 of the Act, as with all other preceding Acts which defined the Kimberley Land Division, defines the Division as "all that portion of the State lying to the North of the parallel of 19° 30' South latitude." This represents all of the Kimberley region other than the southern part of Eighty Mile Beach and about half of Shire of Halls Creek.

== History ==
The division was defined in the Land Regulations on 2 March 1887, and first appeared in legislation in section 38 of the Land Act 1898. On 12 December 1905, the Surveyor General wrote, "It will be an advantage to have the State divided into as many districts as possible to show to people. I would suggest the division of Kimberley." On 13 June 1906, 12 new land districts were gazetted covering the entire Kimberley division.

Section 28 of the Land Act 1933 preserved the wording of the 1898 Act, as did the 1997 act.
