= List of Anamidae species =

List of spider species

This page lists all described species of the spider family Anamidae accepted by the World Spider Catalog as of January 2021:

== Aname ==
Aname

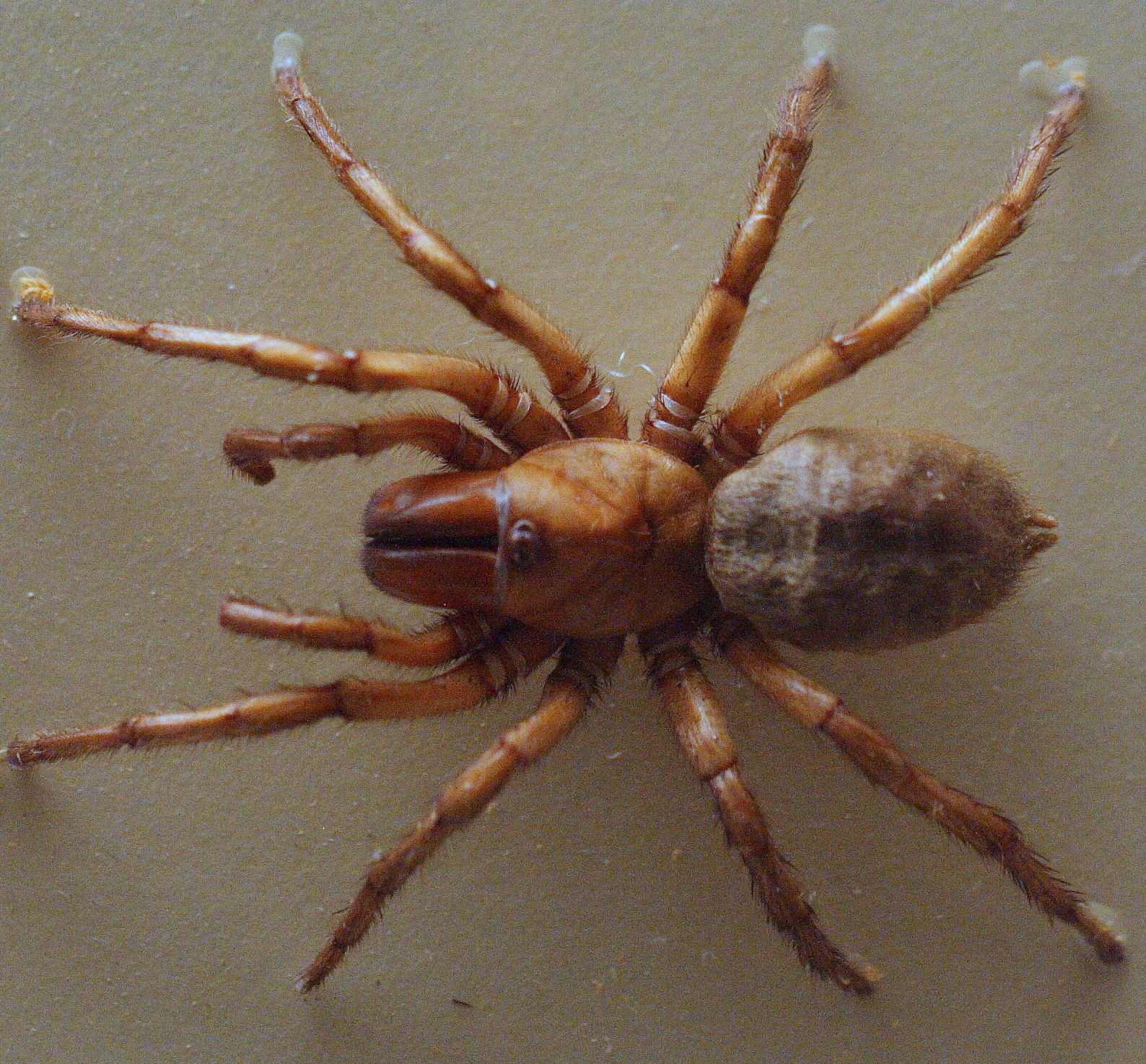
Aname grandis

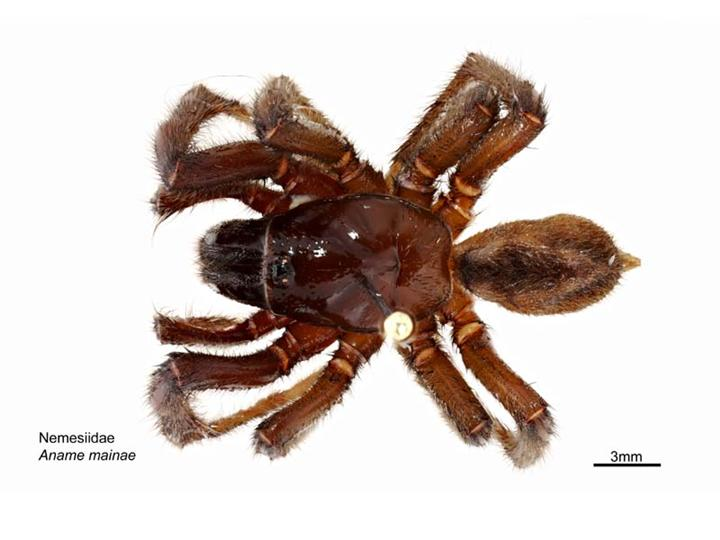
Aname mainae

Aname L. Koch, 1873

- A. aragog Harvey, Framenau, Wojcieszek, Rix & Harvey, 2012 — Australia (Western Australia)
- A. atra (Strand, 1913) — Australia (South Australia)
- A. aurea Rainbow & Pulleine, 1918 — Australia (New South Wales)
- A. baileyorum Castalanelli, Framenau, Huey, Hillyer & Harvey, 2020 — Australia (Western Australia)
- A. barrema Raven, 1985 — Australia (Queensland)
- A. blackdownensis Raven, 1985 — Australia (Queensland)
- A. camara Raven, 1985 — Australia (Queensland)
- A. carina Raven, 1985 — Australia (Queensland)
- A. coenosa Rainbow & Pulleine, 1918 — Australia (South Australia)
- A. collinsorum Raven, 1985 — Australia (Queensland)
- A. comosa Rainbow & Pulleine, 1918 — Australia (South Australia)
- A. distincta (Rainbow, 1914) — Australia (Queensland)
- A. diversicolor (Hogg, 1902) — Australia (Queensland)
- A. elegans (Harvey, Wilson & Rix, 2022) — Australia (South Australia)
- A. ellenae Harvey, Framenau, Wojcieszek, Rix & Harvey, 2012 — Australia (Western Australia)
- A. exulans Harvey & Huey, 2020 — Australia (Western Australia)
- A. frostorum Castalanelli, Framenau, Huey, Hillyer & Harvey, 2020 — Australia (Western Australia)
- A. fuscocincta Rainbow & Pulleine, 1918 — Australia (Western Australia)
- A. grandis Rainbow & Pulleine, 1918 — Australia (South Australia)
- A. grothi Castalanelli, Framenau, Huey, Hillyer & Harvey, 2020 — Australia (Western Australia)
- A. hirsuta Rainbow & Pulleine, 1918 — Australia (South Australia)
- A. humptydoo Raven, 1985 — Australia (Northern Territory)
- A. inimica Raven, 1985 — Australia (Queensland, New South Wales)
- A. kirrama Raven, 1984 — Australia (Queensland)
- A. lillianae Harvey & Huey, 2020 — Australia (Western Australia)
- A. longitheca Raven, 1985 — Australia (Queensland)
- A. lorica Castalanelli, Framenau, Huey, Hillyer & Harvey, 2020 — Australia (Western Australia)
- A. maculata (Rainbow & Pulleine, 1918) — Australia (Western Australia)
- A. mainae Raven, 2000 — Australia (South Australia)
- A. marae Harvey, Framenau, Wojcieszek, Rix & Harvey, 2012 — Australia (Western Australia)
- A. mcalpinei Castalanelli, Framenau, Huey, Hillyer & Harvey, 2020 — Australia (Western Australia)
- A. mccleeryorum Harvey & Huey, 2020 — Australia (Western Australia)
- A. mellosa Harvey, Framenau, Wojcieszek, Rix & Harvey, 2012 — Australia (Western Australia)
- A. munyardae Castalanelli, Framenau, Huey, Hillyer & Harvey, 2020 — Australia (Western Australia)
- A. nitidimarina Castalanelli, Framenau, Huey, Hillyer & Harvey, 2020 — Australia (Western Australia)
- A. pallida L. Koch, 1873 (type) — Australia (Queensland)
- A. phillipae Harvey & Huey, 2020 — Australia (Western Australia)
- A. platypus (L. Koch, 1875) — Australia
- A. pulchella (Harvey, Wilson & Rix, 2022) — Australia (Western Australia)
- A. robertsorum Raven, 1985 — Australia (Queensland)
- A. simoneae Harvey & Huey, 2020 — Australia (Western Australia)
- A. sinuata Castalanelli, Framenau, Huey, Hillyer & Harvey, 2020 — Australia (Western Australia)
- A. tasmanica Hogg, 1902 — Australia (Tasmania)
- A. tigrina Raven, 1985 — Australia (Queensland)
- A. vernonorum Castalanelli, Framenau, Huey, Hillyer & Harvey, 2020 — Australia (Western Australia)
- A. warialda Raven, 1985 — Australia (Queensland, New South Wales)
- A. watsoni Castalanelli, Framenau, Huey, Hillyer & Harvey, 2020 — Australia (Western Australia)
- A. whitei Castalanelli, Framenau, Huey, Hillyer & Harvey, 2020 — Australia (Western Australia)

== Chenistonia ==
Chenistonia Hogg, 1901

- C. boranup Main, 2012 — Australia (Western Australia)
- C. caeruleomontana (Raven, 1984) — Australia (New South Wales)
- C. earthwatchorum (Raven, 1984) — Australia (Queensland)
- C. hickmani (Raven, 1984) — Australia (New South Wales)
- C. maculata Hogg, 1901 (type) — Australia (Victoria)
- C. montana (Raven, 1984) — Australia (New South Wales)
- C. trevallynia Hickman, 1926 — Australia (Tasmania)
- C. tropica (Raven, 1984) — Australia (Queensland)

== Hesperonatalius ==
Hesperonatalius Castalanelli, Huey, Hillyer & Harvey, 2017

- H. harrietae Castalanelli, Huey, Hillyer & Harvey, 2017 — Australia (Western)
- H. langlandsi Castalanelli, Huey, Hillyer & Harvey, 2017 — Australia (Western)
- H. maxwelli Castalanelli, Huey, Hillyer & Harvey, 2017 (type) — Australia (Western)

== Kwonkan ==
Kwonkan Main, 1983

- K. anatolion Main, 1983 — Australia (South Australia)
- K. currycomboides (Main, 1986) — Australia (Western Australia)
- K. eboracum Main, 1983 — Australia (Western Australia)
- K. goongarriensis Main, 1983 — Australia (Western Australia)
- K. linnaei (Main, 2008) — Australia (Western Australia)
- K. moriartii Main, 1983 — Australia (Western Australia)
- K. silvestris Main, 1983 — Australia (Western Australia)
- K. turrigera (Main, 1994) — Australia (Western Australia, South Australia)
- K. wonganensis (Main, 1977) (type) — Australia (Western Australia)

== Namea ==
Namea Raven, 1984

- N. brisbanensis Raven, 1984 — Australia (Queensland)
- N. bunya Raven, 1984 — Australia (Queensland)
- N. calcaria Raven, 1984 — Australia (Queensland)
- N. callemonda Raven, 1984 — Australia (Queensland)
- N. capricornia Raven, 1984 (type) — Australia (Queensland)
- N. cucurbita Raven, 1984 — Australia (Queensland)
- N. dahmsi Raven, 1984 — Australia (Queensland)
- N. dicalcaria Raven, 1984 — Australia (New South Wales)
- N. excavans Raven, 1984 — Australia (Queensland)
- N. flavomaculata (Rainbow & Pulleine, 1918) — Australia (Queensland)
- N. gloriosa Rix, Wilson & Harvey, 2020 — Australia (Queensland)
- N. gowardae Rix, Wilson & Harvey, 2020 — Australia (Queensland)
- N. jimna Raven, 1984 — Australia (Queensland)
- N. nebo Rix, Wilson & Harvey, 2020 — Australia (Queensland)
- N. nebulosa Raven, 1984 — Australia (Queensland)
- N. nigritarsus Rix, Wilson & Harvey, 2020 — Australia (Queensland)
- N. olympus Raven, 1984 — Australia (Queensland)
- N. salanitri Raven, 1984 — Australia (Queensland, New South Wales)
- N. saundersi Raven, 1984 — Australia (Queensland)

== Proshermacha ==
Proshermacha Simon, 1908

- P. armigera (Rainbow & Pulleine, 1918) — Australia (Western Australia)
- P. auropilosa (Rainbow & Pulleine, 1918) — Australia
- P. cuspidata (Main, 1954) — Australia (Western Australia)
- P. intricata (Rainbow & Pulleine, 1918) — Australia
- P. maculata (Rainbow & Pulleine, 1918) — Australia
- P. subarmata Simon, 1908 (type) — Australia
- P. tepperi (Hogg, 1902) — Southern Australia
- P. tigrina Simon, 1908 — Australia
- P. villosa (Rainbow & Pulleine, 1918) — Australia (Western Australia)

== Swolnpes ==
Swolnpes Main & Framenau, 2009

- S. darwini Main & Framenau, 2009 (type) — Australia (Western Australia)
- S. morganensis Main & Framenau, 2009 — Australia (Western Australia)

== Teyl ==
Teyl Main, 1975

- T. damsonoides (Main, 1983) — Australia (Western Australia)
- T. harveyi Main, 2004 — Australia (Victoria)
- T. heuretes Huey, Rix, Wilson, Hillyer & Harvey, 2019 — Australia (Western Australia)
- T. luculentus Main, 1975 (type) — Australia (Western Australia)
- T. vancouveri (Main, 1985) — Australia (Western Australia)
- T. walkeri Main, 2004 — Australia (Victoria)
- T. yeni Main, 2004 — Australia (Victoria)

== Teyloides ==
Teyloides Main, 1985

- T. bakeri Main, 1985 (type) — Australia (South Australia)

== Troglodiplura ==
Troglodiplura Main, 1969

- T. beirutpakbarai Harvey & Rix, 2020 — Australia (South Australia)
- T. challeni Harvey & Rix, 2020 — Australia (Western Australia)
- T. harrisi Harvey & Rix, 2020 — Australia (Western Australia)
- T. lowryi Main, 1969 (type) — Australia (Western Australia)
- T. samankunani Harvey & Rix, 2020 — Australia (Western Australia)
