= Aname ningaloo =

Scientific classification
- Kingdom: Animalia
- Phylum: Arthropoda
- Subphylum: Chelicerata
- Class: Arachnida
- Order: Araneae
- Infraorder: Mygalomorphae
- Family: Anamidae
- Genus: Aname
- Species: A. ningaloo

Binomial name
- Aname ningaloo Wilson, Rix & Harvey, 2023

Species of spider

Aname ningaloo is a species of mygalomorph spider in the Anamidae family. It is endemic to Australia. It was described in 2023 by Jeremy Wilson, Michael Rix and Mark Harvey.

== Etymology ==
The specific epithet ningaloo refers to the type locality within the Ningaloo Coast World Heritage Area.

== Description ==
The female holotype has a body length of 17.4 mm. In life the carapace and legs are dark chocolate-brown.

== Distribution and habitat ==
The species occurs in north-west Western Australia in the Cape Range, within the Carnarvon bioregion, some 1100 km north of Perth. Its habitat is characterised by coastal sandplains and spinifex grasslands on limestone hills.
