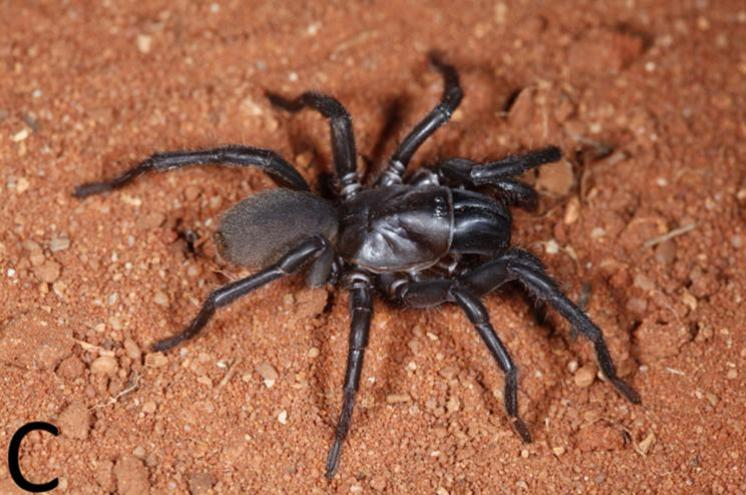
- Female

Scientific classification
- Kingdom: Animalia
- Phylum: Arthropoda
- Subphylum: Chelicerata
- Class: Arachnida
- Order: Araneae
- Infraorder: Mygalomorphae
- Family: Anamidae
- Genus: Aname
- Species: A. salina

Binomial name
- Aname salina Wilson, Rix & Harvey, 2023

= Aname salina =

Species of spider

Aname salina is a species of mygalomorph spider in the Anamidae family. It is endemic to Australia. It was described in 2023 by Jeremy Wilson, Michael Rix and Mark Harvey.

== Etymology ==
The specific epithet salina (Latin for ‘salt’ or ‘salty’) refers to the species’ coastal distribution.

== Description ==
The male holotype has a body length of 23.7 mm, the female 19.0 mm. In life the carapace and legs are dark brown, almost black, in colour.

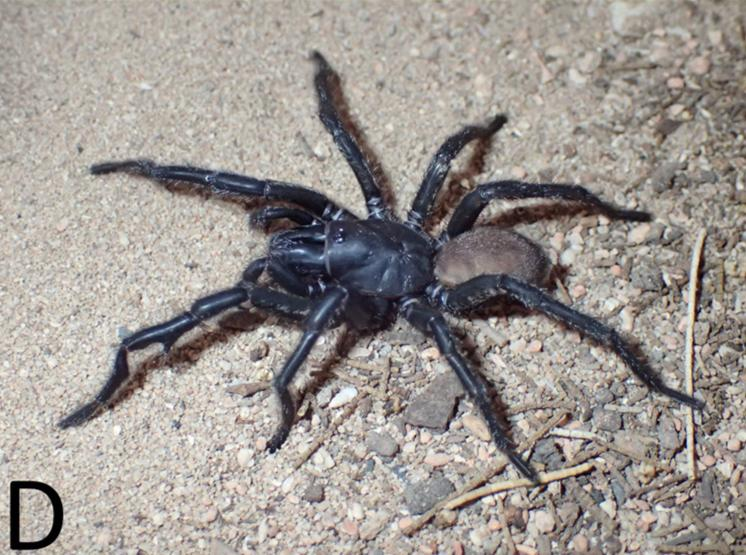
Male

== Distribution and habitat ==
The species occurs in north-west Western Australia, within the Carnarvon bioregion, some 1100 km north of Perth. Its habitat is characterised by a mix of coastal habitats, salt and sand flats, as well as tussockand spinifex grasslands. A population of the species has been recorded in the Cape Range National Park, with another west of Onslow, where the holotype was collected at the Ashburton Salt Project.
