= Aname wongalara =

Scientific classification
- Kingdom: Animalia
- Phylum: Arthropoda
- Subphylum: Chelicerata
- Class: Arachnida
- Order: Araneae
- Infraorder: Mygalomorphae
- Family: Anamidae
- Genus: Aname
- Species: A. wongalara

Binomial name
- Aname wongalara Wilson, Rix & Harvey, 2023

Species of spider

Aname wongalara is a species of mygalomorph spider in the Anamidae family. It is endemic to Australia. It was described in 2023 by Jeremy Wilson, Michael Rix and Mark Harvey.

== Etymology ==
The specific epithet wongalara refers to the Wongalara Sanctuary, an Australian Wildlife Conservancy conservation reserve in the Northern Territory, where the holotype was collected.

== Description ==
The male holotype has a body length of 16.4 mm. The carapace is red-brown, the legs orange-brown.

== Distribution and habitat ==
The only known specimen was collected in the Wongalara Sanctuary in the Gulf Fall and Uplands bioregion. Its habitat includes tropical eucalypt and Acacia woodlands and grasslands.
