= Aname tenuipes =

Scientific classification
- Kingdom: Animalia
- Phylum: Arthropoda
- Subphylum: Chelicerata
- Class: Arachnida
- Order: Araneae
- Infraorder: Mygalomorphae
- Family: Anamidae
- Genus: Aname
- Species: A. tenuipes

Binomial name
- Aname tenuipes Wilson, Rix & Harvey, 2023

Species of spider

Aname tenuipes is a species of mygalomorph spider in the Anamidae family. It is endemic to Australia. It was described in 2023 by Jeremy Wilson, Michael Rix and Mark Harvey.

== Etymology ==
The specific epithet tenuipes (from Latin tenuis ‘thin’ and pes ‘foot’) refers to the species’ anatomy.

== Description ==
The male holotype has a body length of 23.1 mm. The carapace is chocolate-brown; the legs dark orange-brown.

== Distribution and habitat ==
The species has been recorded from the Dundas Nature Reserve, where the holotype was collected, in central-southern Western Australia, as well as farther east in the Great Victoria Desert around the border between Western and South Australia. It has been found in the Coolgardie, Great Victoria Desert and Nullarbor bioregions. Its habitat includes eucalypt, Acacia and Casuarina woodlands and mallee.
