= Aname tatarnici =

Scientific classification
- Kingdom: Animalia
- Phylum: Arthropoda
- Subphylum: Chelicerata
- Class: Arachnida
- Order: Araneae
- Infraorder: Mygalomorphae
- Family: Anamidae
- Genus: Aname
- Species: A. tatarnici

Binomial name
- Aname tatarnici Wilson, Rix & Harvey, 2023

Species of spider

Aname tatarnici is a species of mygalomorph spider in the Anamidae family. It is endemic to Australia. It was described in 2023 by Jeremy Wilson, Michael Rix and Mark Harvey.

== Etymology ==
The specific epithet tatarnici honours Nikolai Tatarnic, collector of the holotype specimen and Curator of Entomology at the Western Australian Museum, who took part in several Bush Blitz expeditions.

== Description ==
The male holotype has a body length of 21.9 mm. The carapace is chocolate-brown, the legs orange-brown.

== Distribution and habitat ==
The holotype was collected in the Great Victoria Desert in western South Australia at a campsite 96 km north of Hughes Siding in the Nullarbor bioregion. It is known only from the type locality. Its habitat includes eucalypt, Acacia, Casuarina and mallee woodlands.
