= Aname fuscocincta =

Scientific classification
- Kingdom: Animalia
- Phylum: Arthropoda
- Subphylum: Chelicerata
- Class: Arachnida
- Order: Araneae
- Infraorder: Mygalomorphae
- Family: Anamidae
- Genus: Aname
- Species: A. fuscocincta

Binomial name
- Aname fuscocincta Rainbow & Pulleine, 1918

Species of spider

Aname fuscocincta is a species of mygalomorph spider in the Anamidae family. It is endemic to Australia. It was described in 1918 by Australian arachnologists William Joseph Rainbow and Robert Henry Pulleine.

== Distribution and habitat ==
The species occurs in south-west Western Australia in open forest habitats. The type locality is Kalamunda, a suburb of Perth.

== Behaviour ==
The spiders are fossorial, terrestrial predators.
