= Aname exulans =

Scientific classification
- Kingdom: Animalia
- Phylum: Arthropoda
- Subphylum: Chelicerata
- Class: Arachnida
- Order: Araneae
- Infraorder: Mygalomorphae
- Family: Anamidae
- Genus: Aname
- Species: A. exulans

Binomial name
- Aname exulans Harvey and Huey, 2020

Species of spider

Aname exulans is a species of mygalomorph spider in the Anamidae family. It is endemic to Australia. It was described in 2020 by Mark Harvey, Karl Gruber, Mia Hillyer and Joel Huey. The specific epithet exulans (Latin for an exiled or banished person) refers to its restricted offshore island distribution.

== Description ==
The spiders can be distinguished from other Aname species by the abdominal colour pattern of a dark median stripe and indistinct chevrons against a pale background.

== Distribution and habitat ==
The species' range is limited to the Houtman Abrolhos archipelago off north-west Western Australia. The type locality is West Wallabi Island. It also occurs on East Wallabi Island and North Island.
