= Aname lillianae =

Scientific classification
- Kingdom: Animalia
- Phylum: Arthropoda
- Subphylum: Chelicerata
- Class: Arachnida
- Order: Araneae
- Infraorder: Mygalomorphae
- Family: Anamidae
- Genus: Aname
- Species: A. lillianae

Binomial name
- Aname lillianae Harvey and Huey, 2020

Species of spider

Aname lillianae is a species of mygalomorph spider in the Anamidae family. It is endemic to Australia. It was described in 2020 by Mark Harvey, Karl Gruber, Mia Hillyer and Joel Huey. The species epithet lillianae honours Lillian Huey, daughter of Joel Huey.

== Distribution and habitat ==
The species occurs in the Mid West region of Western Australia, where it is found throughout the northern Wheatbelt. The type locality is the Pallottine mission near Tardun.
