= Aname hirsuta =

Scientific classification
- Kingdom: Animalia
- Phylum: Arthropoda
- Subphylum: Chelicerata
- Class: Arachnida
- Order: Araneae
- Infraorder: Mygalomorphae
- Family: Anamidae
- Genus: Aname
- Species: A. hirsuta

Binomial name
- Aname hirsuta Rainbow & Pulleine, 1918

Species of spider

Aname hirsuta is a species of mygalomorph spider in the Anamidae family. It is endemic to Australia. It was described in 1918 by Australian arachnologists William Joseph Rainbow and Robert Henry Pulleine.

== Distribution and habitat ==
The species occurs in South Australia. The type locality is Mallala, north of Adelaide.
