= Hesperonatalius langlandsi =

Scientific classification
- Kingdom: Animalia
- Phylum: Arthropoda
- Subphylum: Chelicerata
- Class: Arachnida
- Order: Araneae
- Infraorder: Mygalomorphae
- Family: Anamidae
- Genus: Hesperonatalius
- Species: H. langlandsi

Binomial name
- Hesperonatalius langlandsi Castalanelli, Huey, Hillyer & Harvey, 2017

Species of spider

Hesperonatalius langlandsi is a species of mygalomorph spider in the Anamidae family. It is endemic to Australia. It was described in 2017 by Mark Castalanelli, Joel Huey, Mia Hillyer and Mark Harvey.

== Distribution and habitat ==
The species occurs in Western Australia in the Carnarvon bioregion. The type locality is Lake Macleod, 30 km north of the port of Carnarvon.
