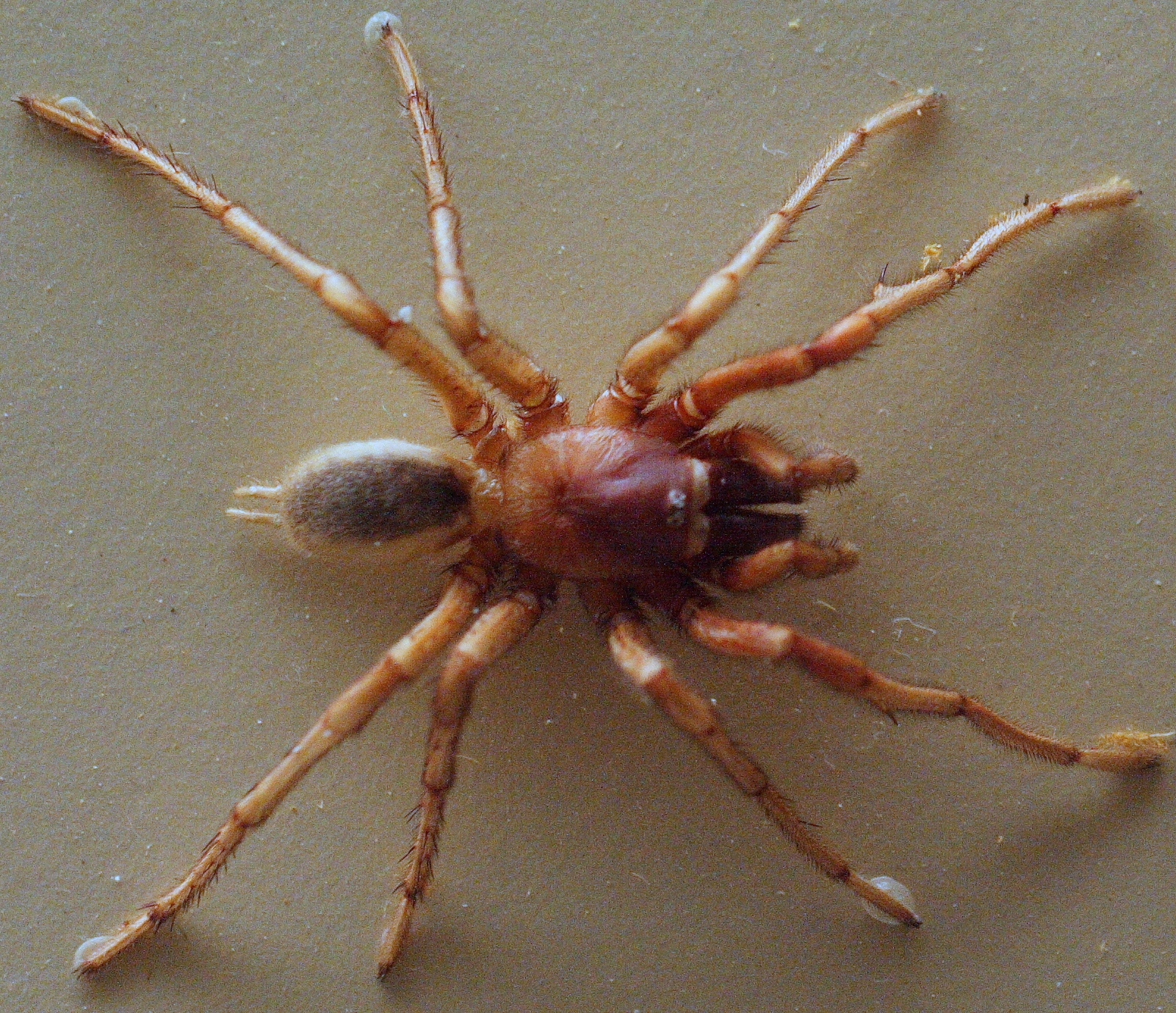

Scientific classification
- Kingdom: Animalia
- Phylum: Arthropoda
- Subphylum: Chelicerata
- Class: Arachnida
- Order: Araneae
- Infraorder: Mygalomorphae
- Family: Anamidae
- Genus: Aname
- Species: A. grandis

Binomial name
- Aname grandis Rainbow & Pulleine, 1918

Synonyms
- Aname robusta Rainbow & Pulleine, 1918

= Aname grandis =

Species of spider

Aname grandis is a species of mygalomorph spider in the Anamidae family. It is endemic to Australia. It was described in 1918 by Australian arachnologists William Joseph Rainbow and Robert Henry Pulleine.

== Distribution and habitat ==
The species occurs in South Australia in low woodland habitats with sandy and loamy soils. Type localities include Pichi Richi and Woolshed Flat in the southern Flinders Ranges.

== Behaviour ==
The spiders are fossorial, terrestrial predators.
