= Aname mellosa =

Scientific classification
- Kingdom: Animalia
- Phylum: Arthropoda
- Subphylum: Chelicerata
- Class: Arachnida
- Order: Araneae
- Infraorder: Mygalomorphae
- Family: Anamidae
- Genus: Aname
- Species: A. mellosa

Binomial name
- Aname mellosa Harvey, Framenau, Wojcieszkek, Rix & Harvey, 2012

Species of spider

Aname mellosa is a species of mygalomorph spider in the Anamidae family. It is endemic to Australia. It was described in 2012 by Frances Harvey, Volker Framenau, Janine Wojcieszkek, Michael Rix and Mark Harvey. The specific epithet mellosa (Latin for ‘honey’ or ‘honey-coloured’) refers to the yellowish-brown colouration of parts of the carapace.

== Distribution and habitat ==
The species occurs in north-west Western Australia. The type locality is Jinayri, 60 km north-west of Newman in the Pilbara region.
