= Aname mccleeryorum =

Scientific classification
- Kingdom: Animalia
- Phylum: Arthropoda
- Subphylum: Chelicerata
- Class: Arachnida
- Order: Araneae
- Infraorder: Mygalomorphae
- Family: Anamidae
- Genus: Aname
- Species: A. mccleeryorum

Binomial name
- Aname mccleeryorum Harvey and Huey, 2020

Species of spider

Aname mccleeryorum is a species of mygalomorph spider in the Anamidae family. It is endemic to Australia. It was described in 2020 by Mark Harvey, Karl Gruber, Mia Hillyer and Joel Huey. The species epithet mccleeryorum honours the McCleery family's support for the Western Australian Museum Foundation.

== Distribution and habitat ==
The species occurs in the Mid West region of Western Australia in kwongan heath and wandoo woodland habitats. It is found throughout the Geraldton Sandplains bioregion, from Oakajee and the Chapman Valley southwards to the Lesueur National Park. The type locality is the Chapman Valley.
