= Aname sinuata =

Scientific classification
- Kingdom: Animalia
- Phylum: Arthropoda
- Subphylum: Chelicerata
- Class: Arachnida
- Order: Araneae
- Infraorder: Mygalomorphae
- Family: Anamidae
- Genus: Aname
- Species: A. sinuata

Binomial name
- Aname sinuata Castalanelli, Framenau, Huey, Hillyer & Harvey, 2020

Species of spider

Aname sinuata is a species of mygalomorph spider in the Anamidae family. It is endemic to Australia. It was described in 2020 by Mark Castalanelli, Volker Framenau, Joel Huey, Mia Hillyer and Mark Harvey.

== Distribution and habitat ==
The species occurs in north-west Western Australia. The type locality is Cape Lambert, near Wickham, in the arid Pilbara region.
