= Aname simoneae =

Scientific classification
- Kingdom: Animalia
- Phylum: Arthropoda
- Subphylum: Chelicerata
- Class: Arachnida
- Order: Araneae
- Infraorder: Mygalomorphae
- Family: Anamidae
- Genus: Aname
- Species: A. simoneae

Binomial name
- Aname simoneae Harvey and Huey, 2020

Species of spider

Aname simoneae is a species of mygalomorph spider in the Anamidae family. It is endemic to Australia. It was described in 2020 by Mark Harvey, Karl Gruber, Mia Hillyer and Joel Huey. The species epithet simoneae honours Simone Huey, wife of Joel Huey.

== Distribution and habitat ==
The species occurs in Western Australia. It is found in the Great Victoria Desert, Coolgardie and Murchison bioregions. The type locality is 21 km south of Laverton.
