= Aname pulchella =

Scientific classification
- Kingdom: Animalia
- Phylum: Arthropoda
- Subphylum: Chelicerata
- Class: Arachnida
- Order: Araneae
- Infraorder: Mygalomorphae
- Family: Anamidae
- Genus: Aname
- Species: A. pulchella

Binomial name
- Aname pulchella Harvey, Wilson & Rix, 2022

Species of spider

Aname pulchella is a species of mygalomorph spider in the Anamidae family. It is endemic to Australia. It was described in 2022 by Mark Harvey, Jeremy Wilson and Michael Rix.

== Distribution and habitat ==
The species occurs in south-east Western Australia in the Hampton and Nullarbor bioregions. The type locality is the Madura caravan park.
