= Aname phillipae =

Scientific classification
- Kingdom: Animalia
- Phylum: Arthropoda
- Subphylum: Chelicerata
- Class: Arachnida
- Order: Araneae
- Infraorder: Mygalomorphae
- Family: Anamidae
- Genus: Aname
- Species: A. phillipae

Binomial name
- Aname phillipae Harvey and Huey, 2020

Species of spider

Aname phillipae is a species of mygalomorph spider in the Anamidae family. It is endemic to Australia. It was described in 2020 by Mark Harvey, Karl Gruber, Mia Hillyer and Joel Huey. The species epithet phillipae honours Phillipa Huey, daughter of Joel Huey.

== Distribution and habitat ==
The species occurs in Western Australia in open mulga woodland and shrubland habitats. It is found in the Gascoyne, Murchison and Coolgardie bioregions. The type locality is Deception Hill, 111 km north-north-west of Koolyanobbing.
