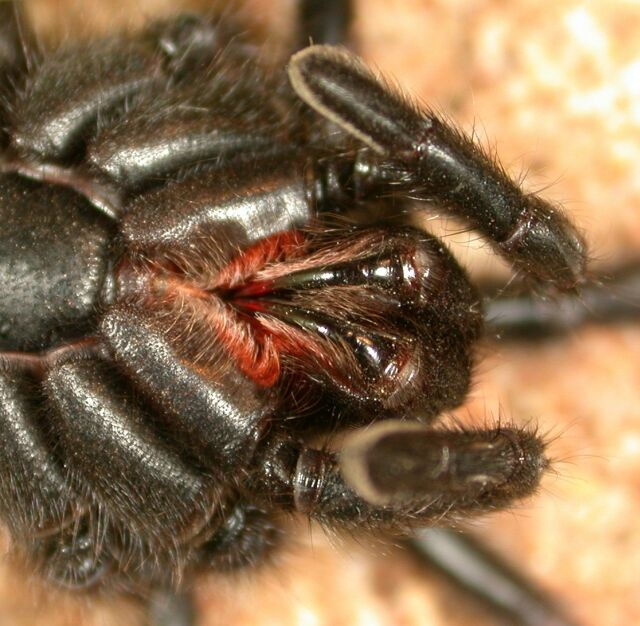

Scientific classification
- Kingdom: Animalia
- Phylum: Arthropoda
- Subphylum: Chelicerata
- Class: Arachnida
- Order: Araneae
- Infraorder: Mygalomorphae
- Family: Anamidae
- Genus: Aname
- Species: A. diversicolor

Binomial name
- Aname diversicolor (Hogg, 1902)

= Aname diversicolor =

Species of spider

Aname diversicolor, the black wishbone spider, is a species of burrowing arachnid found in southern Australia.

== Description ==
A diplurine spider, family Anamidae, of the mygalomorphs. The colour in mainly black, sometimes bluish on the underside, Legs are long. Lateral margins are rounded at the broad carapace, which is at least 6.5 and greater than 10 millimetres in length. They are most readily diagnosed by the form of its burrow, the non-surfacing annex is close to the entry; tightly woven silk lines this Y–shape and the annex may formed immediately next to the entry. The habit of the sexually matured males to roam in humid and sudden summer storms on the Swan Coastal Plain is also observed as a characteristic of this species.

== Ecology ==
They are widespread in their distribution range, although rarely abundant. Males are encountered in urban environs during humid weather in summer, as this induces them to wander, but they are mostly sedentary and remain within their silk-lined accommodation. Observation of the aggressive, large and black individuals is often mistaken as a dangerous and unrelated species of funnel-web spider genus Atrax,

Only one arm of the burrow reaches the surface, the other may function as a refuge for the spider if inundated by flooding.

== Taxonomy ==
The species was first described as Dekana diversicolor by Henry Roughton Hogg in 1902. It was later assigned to the genus Aname, all of which are endemic to Australia, on the basis of morphological characters. The type locality of this description was given as "Deka Station", which the revising author was unable to locate, the type specimen was also unavailable. The second part of the location was recorded by Hogg as "Blackhall", and Main indicates this may have been a misspelling of the location Blackall in western Queensland. A new specimen was collected near Elliston, South Australia and this was assigned as the neotype for the species.

They display a characteristic of a group the arachnologist Barbara York Main referred to as 'wishbone spiders', for the 'Y' or wishbone-shape of their burrows. This characteristic amongst some genera of Australian mygalomorph genera was regarded as convergent, rather than indicating a monophyletic alliance.
