= Kwonkan eboracum =

Scientific classification
- Kingdom: Animalia
- Phylum: Arthropoda
- Subphylum: Chelicerata
- Class: Arachnida
- Order: Araneae
- Infraorder: Mygalomorphae
- Family: Anamidae
- Genus: Kwonkan
- Species: K. eboracum

Binomial name
- Kwonkan eboracum Main, 1983

Species of spider

Kwonkan eboracum is a species of mygalomorph spider in the Anamidae family. It is endemic to Australia. It was described in 1983 by Australian arachnologist Barbara York Main.

== Distribution and habitat ==
The species occurs in south-west Western Australia in heath and open scrub habitats. The type locality is Eboracum, 22 km north-east of the Wheatbelt town of Tammin.

== Behaviour ==
The spiders are fossorial predators that construct and shelter in cryptic burrows in plant litter.
