= Aname aragog =

Scientific classification
- Kingdom: Animalia
- Phylum: Arthropoda
- Subphylum: Chelicerata
- Class: Arachnida
- Order: Araneae
- Infraorder: Mygalomorphae
- Family: Anamidae
- Genus: Aname
- Species: A. aragog

Binomial name
- Aname aragog Harvey et al., 2012

Species of spider

Aname aragog is a species of trapdoor spider in the family Anamidae. It is found in the Pilbara region of Western Australia. The specific epithet is in reference to the spider Aragog in J.K. Rowling's Harry Potter books.

== See also ==
- List of organisms named after the Harry Potter series
  - Lycosa aragogi
  - Ochyrocera aragogue
