= Aname tasmanica =

Scientific classification
- Kingdom: Animalia
- Phylum: Arthropoda
- Subphylum: Chelicerata
- Class: Arachnida
- Order: Araneae
- Infraorder: Mygalomorphae
- Family: Anamidae
- Genus: Aname
- Species: A. tasmanica

Binomial name
- Aname tasmanica Hogg, 1902

Species of spider

Aname tasmanica is a species of mygalomorph spider in the Anamidae family. It is endemic to Tasmania. It was described in 1902 by British arachnologist Henry Roughton Hogg.

== Distribution and habitat ==
The species is endemic to Tasmania. The type locality is Table Cape in the north-west of the state.

== Behaviour ==
The spiders are fossorial, terrestrial predators.
