= Kwonkan =

Scientific classification
- Kingdom: Animalia
- Phylum: Arthropoda
- Subphylum: Chelicerata
- Class: Arachnida
- Order: Araneae
- Infraorder: Mygalomorphae
- Family: Anamidae
- Genus: Kwonkan; Main, 1983

Type species
- K. wonganensis

Species
- 14, see text

Synonyms
- Yilgarnia

Genus of spiders

Kwonkan is a genus of Australian mygalomorph spiders first described by Barbara York Main in 1983. It was originally assigned to Dipluridae, but was later assigned to Nemesiidae due to similarities to the genus Aname, before being transferred to the family Anamidae in 2010. The known distribution of described species in the genus is restricted to the states of South Australia, Western Australia, and Northern Territory. Yilgarnia is now considered a synonym for this genus, and its type species is assigned to Kwonkan currycomboides.

== Species ==
As of October 2026 it contains thirteen species:

- Kwonkan anatolion Main, 1983 – South Australia
- Kwonkan currycomboides (Main, 1986) – Western Australia
- Kwonkan dissitus Harvey, Wilson & Rix, 2023 — South Australia
- Kwonkan eboracum Main, 1983 – Western Australia
- Kwonkan elatus Wilson, Urso, Rix, Volschenk, Cruz Bedrón & Harvey, 2026 — Western Australia
- Kwonkan fluctellus Wilson, Rix & Harvey, 2025 — Western Australia
- Kwonkan goongarriensis Main, 1983 – Western Australia
- Kwonkan linnaei (Main, 2008) – Western Australia
- Kwonkan moriartii Main, 1983 – Western Australia
- Kwonkan nemoralis Wilson, Rix & Harvey, 2025 — Western Australia
- Kwonkan procul Harvey, Wilson & Rix, 2023 — South Australia
- Kwonkan seductus Harvey, Wilson & Rix, 2023 — Northern Territory (Australia)
- Kwonkan silvestris Main, 1983 – Western Australia
- Kwonkan turriger (Main, 1994) – South and Western Australia
- Kwonkan wonganensis (Main, 1977) – Western Australia
- Kwonkan yorkrakine Wilson, Urso, Rix, Volschenk, Cruz Bedrón & Harvey, 2026 — Western Australia
