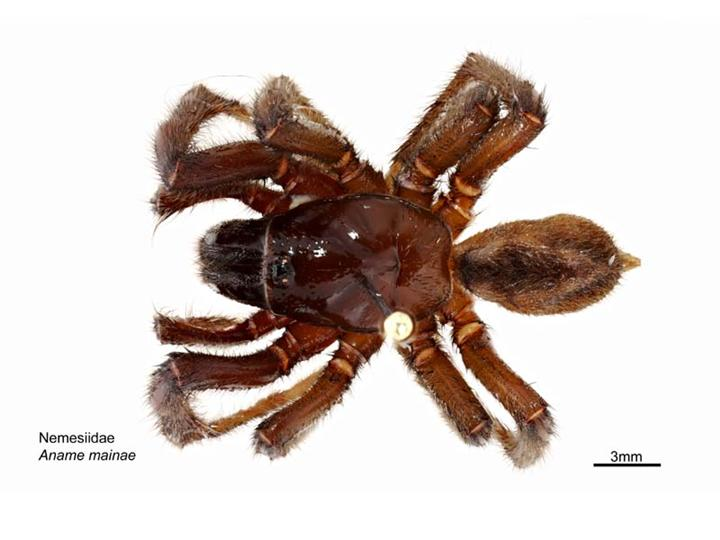

Scientific classification
- Kingdom: Animalia
- Phylum: Arthropoda
- Subphylum: Chelicerata
- Class: Arachnida
- Order: Araneae
- Infraorder: Mygalomorphae
- Family: Anamidae
- Genus: Aname
- Species: A. marae

Binomial name
- Aname marae Harvey, Framenau, Wojcieszkek, Rix & Harvey, 2012

= Aname marae =

Species of spider

Aname marae is a species of mygalomorph spider in the Anamidae family. It is endemic to Australia. It was described in 2012 by Frances Harvey, Volker Framenau, Janine Wojcieszkek, Michael Rix and Mark Harvey. The specific epithet marae honours Mara Blosfelds, the mother of the senior author.

== Distribution and habitat ==
The species occurs in north-west Western Australia in the Pilbara region. The type locality is 4 km north-west of Tom Price.
