= Troglodiplura challeni =

Scientific classification
- Kingdom: Animalia
- Phylum: Arthropoda
- Subphylum: Chelicerata
- Class: Arachnida
- Order: Araneae
- Infraorder: Mygalomorphae
- Family: Anamidae
- Genus: Troglodiplura
- Species: T. challeni

Binomial name
- Troglodiplura challeni Harvey & Rix, 2020

Species of spider

Troglodiplura challeni is a species of troglomorphic spider in the family Anamidae, found in Western Australia.

It was first described in 2020 by Mark Harvey and Michael Rix. The species epithet honours Craig Challen, for his contributions to cave diving and his role in the Tham Luang cave rescue in 2018.

The species is known only from Old Homestead Cave on the Nullarbor Plain from fragments of dead specimens.
