= Aname platypus =

Scientific classification
- Kingdom: Animalia
- Phylum: Arthropoda
- Subphylum: Chelicerata
- Class: Arachnida
- Order: Araneae
- Infraorder: Mygalomorphae
- Family: Anamidae
- Genus: Aname
- Species: A. platypus

Binomial name
- Aname platypus (L.Koch, 1875)

Synonyms
- Brachythele platypus L.Koch, 1875

Species of spider

Aname platypus is a species of mygalomorph spider in the Anamidae family. It is endemic to Australia. It was described in 1875 by German arachnologist Ludwig Carl Christian Koch.
