= Kwonkan linnaei =

Scientific classification
- Kingdom: Animalia
- Phylum: Arthropoda
- Subphylum: Chelicerata
- Class: Arachnida
- Order: Araneae
- Infraorder: Mygalomorphae
- Family: Anamidae
- Genus: Kwonkan
- Species: K. linnaei

Binomial name
- Kwonkan linnaei (Main, 2008)

Synonyms
- Yilgarnia linnaei Main, 2008

Species of spider

Kwonkan linnaei is a species of mygalomorph spider in the Anamidae family. It is endemic to Australia. It was described in 2008 by Australian arachnologist Barbara York Main.

== Distribution and habitat ==
The species occurs in south-western Western Australia, in the Avon Wheatbelt bioregion. The type locality is the Durokoppin Nature Reserve.
