= Chenistonia boranup =

Scientific classification
- Kingdom: Animalia
- Phylum: Arthropoda
- Subphylum: Chelicerata
- Class: Arachnida
- Order: Araneae
- Infraorder: Mygalomorphae
- Family: Anamidae
- Genus: Chenistonia
- Species: C. boranup

Binomial name
- Chenistonia boranup Main, 2012

Species of spider

Chenistonia boranup is a species of mygalomorph spider in the Anamidae family. It is endemic to Australia. It was described in 2012 by Australian arachnologist Barbara York Main.

== Distribution and habitat ==
The species occurs in south-west Western Australia in open karri and jarrah forest habitats. The type locality is Boranup Forest.
