= Proshermacha auropilosa =

Scientific classification
- Kingdom: Animalia
- Phylum: Arthropoda
- Subphylum: Chelicerata
- Class: Arachnida
- Order: Araneae
- Infraorder: Mygalomorphae
- Family: Anamidae
- Genus: Proshermacha
- Species: P. auropilosa

Binomial name
- Proshermacha auropilosa (Rainbow & Pulleine, 1918)

Synonyms
- Chenistonia auropilosa Rainbow, & Pulleine, 1918

Species of spider

Proshermacha auropilosa is a species of mygalomorph spider in the Anamidae family. It is endemic to Australia. It was described in 1918 by Australian arachnologists William Joseph Rainbow and Robert Henry Pulleine.

== Distribution and habitat ==
The species occurs in the south-west of Western Australia, in the Swan Coastal Plain bioregion. The type locality is Armadale, now a suburb of Perth.
