= Teyl walkeri =

Scientific classification
- Kingdom: Animalia
- Phylum: Arthropoda
- Subphylum: Chelicerata
- Class: Arachnida
- Order: Araneae
- Infraorder: Mygalomorphae
- Family: Anamidae
- Genus: Teyl
- Species: T. walkeri

Binomial name
- Teyl walkeri Main, 2004

Species of spider

Teyl walkeri is a species of mygalomorph spider in the Anamidae family. It is endemic to Australia. It was described in 2004 by Australian arachnologist Barbara York Main.

== Distribution and habitat ==
The species occurs in the Mallee region of western Victoria. The type locality is 17.8 km south-east of Murrayville.
