= Troglodiplura samankunani =

Scientific classification
- Kingdom: Animalia
- Phylum: Arthropoda
- Subphylum: Chelicerata
- Class: Arachnida
- Order: Araneae
- Infraorder: Mygalomorphae
- Family: Anamidae
- Genus: Troglodiplura
- Species: T. samankunani

Binomial name
- Troglodiplura samankunani Harvey & Rix, 2020

Species of spider

Troglodiplura samankunani is a species of troglomorphic spider in the family Anamidae, found in Western Australia, in caves on the Nullarbor Plain.

It was first described in 2020 by Mark Harvey and Michael Rix. The species epithet honours Saman Kunan (a Thai diver, who died during the Tham Luang cave rescue of 2018).
