= Chenistonia trevallynia =

Scientific classification
- Kingdom: Animalia
- Phylum: Arthropoda
- Subphylum: Chelicerata
- Class: Arachnida
- Order: Araneae
- Infraorder: Mygalomorphae
- Family: Anamidae
- Genus: Chenistonia
- Species: C. trevallynia

Binomial name
- Chenistonia trevallynia Hickman, 1926

Species of spider

Chenistonia trevallynia is a species of mygalomorph spider in the Anamidae family. It is endemic to Australia. It was described in 1926 by Australian arachnologist Vernon Victor Hickman.

== Distribution and habitat ==
The species occurs in Tasmania. The type locality is Trevallyn, a suburb of Launceston in the north of the state.

== Behaviour ==
The spiders are fossorial, terrestrial predators. They construct silk-lined tubes in burrows beneath logs and rocks in wet situations.
