= Aname kirrama =

Scientific classification
- Kingdom: Animalia
- Phylum: Arthropoda
- Subphylum: Chelicerata
- Class: Arachnida
- Order: Araneae
- Infraorder: Mygalomorphae
- Family: Anamidae
- Genus: Aname
- Species: A. kirrama

Binomial name
- Aname kirrama Raven, 1984

Species of spider

Aname kirrama is a species of mygalomorph spider in the Anamidae family. It is endemic to Australia. It was described in 1984 by Australian arachnologist Robert Raven.

== Distribution and habitat ==
The species occurs in Far North Queensland in closed forest habitats. The type locality is Kirrama in the Tablelands Region.

== Behaviour ==
The spiders are fossorial, terrestrial predators.
