= Aname camara =

Scientific classification
- Kingdom: Animalia
- Phylum: Arthropoda
- Subphylum: Chelicerata
- Class: Arachnida
- Order: Araneae
- Infraorder: Mygalomorphae
- Family: Anamidae
- Genus: Aname
- Species: A. camara

Binomial name
- Aname camara Raven, 1985

Species of spider

Aname camara is a species of mygalomorph spider in the Anamidae family. It is endemic to Australia. It was described in 1985 by Australian arachnologist Robert Raven.

== Distribution and habitat ==
The species occurs in Queensland. The type locality is Aramac in the Barcaldine Region.
