= Kwonkan currycomboides =

Scientific classification
- Kingdom: Animalia
- Phylum: Arthropoda
- Subphylum: Chelicerata
- Class: Arachnida
- Order: Araneae
- Infraorder: Mygalomorphae
- Family: Anamidae
- Genus: Kwonkan
- Species: K. currycomboides

Binomial name
- Kwonkan currycomboides (Main, 1986)

Synonyms
- Yilgarnia currycomboides Main, 1986

Species of spider

Kwonkan currycomboides is a species of mygalomorph spider in the Anamidae family. It is endemic to Australia. It was described in 1986 by Australian arachnologist Barbara York Main.

== Distribution and habitat ==
The species occurs in southern Western Australia, in the Eastern Mallee bioregion. The type locality is Peak Charles.
