= Chenistonia maculata =

Scientific classification
- Kingdom: Animalia
- Phylum: Arthropoda
- Subphylum: Chelicerata
- Class: Arachnida
- Order: Araneae
- Infraorder: Mygalomorphae
- Family: Anamidae
- Genus: Chenistonia
- Species: C. maculata

Binomial name
- Chenistonia maculata Hogg, 1901

Species of spider

Chenistonia maculata is a species of mygalomorph spider in the Anamidae family. It is endemic to Australia. It was described in 1901 by British arachnologist Henry Roughton Hogg.

== Distribution and habitat ==
The species occurs in Victoria. The type locality is Mount Macedon, north of Melbourne. It is also found in the Grampians Range in the west of the state.

== Behaviour ==
The spiders are fossorial, terrestrial predators. They shelter in burrows beneath logs.
