= Teyl harveyi =

Scientific classification
- Kingdom: Animalia
- Phylum: Arthropoda
- Subphylum: Chelicerata
- Class: Arachnida
- Order: Araneae
- Infraorder: Mygalomorphae
- Family: Anamidae
- Genus: Teyl
- Species: T. harveyi

Binomial name
- Teyl harveyi Main, 2004

Species of spider

Teyl harveyi is a species of mygalomorph spider in the Anamidae family. It is endemic to Australia. It was described in 2004 by Australian arachnologist Barbara York Main.

== Distribution and habitat ==
The species occurs in the Mallee region of western Victoria. The type locality is 24.9 km south-east of Murrayville.

The Australian spider species is named in honour of M.S. Harvey, who is renowned for his immense contribution to arachnology. The males of this species are light tan brown with sporadic posterolateral spines. Even so, the diagnosis of the female species is undetermined.
