= Troglodiplura lowryi =

Scientific classification
- Kingdom: Animalia
- Phylum: Arthropoda
- Subphylum: Chelicerata
- Class: Arachnida
- Order: Araneae
- Infraorder: Mygalomorphae
- Family: Anamidae
- Genus: Troglodiplura
- Species: T. lowryi

Binomial name
- Troglodiplura lowryi Main, 1969

Species of spider

Troglodiplura lowryi is a species of spider in the family Anamidae, found in Australia.
