= Kwonkan turrigera =

Scientific classification
- Kingdom: Animalia
- Phylum: Arthropoda
- Subphylum: Chelicerata
- Class: Arachnida
- Order: Araneae
- Infraorder: Mygalomorphae
- Family: Anamidae
- Genus: Kwonkan
- Species: K. turrigera

Binomial name
- Kwonkan turrigera (Main, 1994)

Synonyms
- Aname turrigera Main, 1994

Species of spider

Kwonkan turrigera is a species of mygalomorph spider in the Anamidae family. It is endemic to Australia. It was described in 1994 by Australian arachnologist Barbara York Main.

== Distribution and habitat ==
The species occurs in the states of South Australia and Western Australia.
