= Troglodiplura beirutpakbarai =

Scientific classification
- Kingdom: Animalia
- Phylum: Arthropoda
- Subphylum: Chelicerata
- Class: Arachnida
- Order: Araneae
- Infraorder: Mygalomorphae
- Family: Anamidae
- Genus: Troglodiplura
- Species: T. beirutpakbarai

Binomial name
- Troglodiplura beirutpakbarai Harvey & Rix, 2020

Species of spider

Troglodiplura beirutpakbarai is a species of troglomorphic spider in the family Anamidae, found in South Australia.

It was first described in 2020 by Mark Harvey and Michael Rix. The species epithet honours Beirut Pakbara (involved in Tham Luang cave rescue of 2018 and died as a consequence).
