= Aname distincta =

Scientific classification
- Kingdom: Animalia
- Phylum: Arthropoda
- Subphylum: Chelicerata
- Class: Arachnida
- Order: Araneae
- Infraorder: Mygalomorphae
- Family: Anamidae
- Genus: Aname
- Species: A. distincta

Binomial name
- Aname distincta (Rainbow, 1914)

Synonyms
- Ixamatus distinctus Rainbow, 1914; Dolichosternum attenuatum Rainbow & Pulleine, 1918

Species of spider

Aname distincta, also known as the lesser wishbone spider, is a species of mygalomorph spider in the Anamidae family. It is endemic to Australia. It was described in 1914 by Australian arachnologist William Joseph Rainbow.

== Distribution and habitat ==
The species occurs in south-east Queensland. The type locality is Eidsvold.

== Behaviour ==
The spiders are terrestrial predators.
