= Chenistonia montana =

Scientific classification
- Kingdom: Animalia
- Phylum: Arthropoda
- Subphylum: Chelicerata
- Class: Arachnida
- Order: Araneae
- Infraorder: Mygalomorphae
- Family: Anamidae
- Genus: Chenistonia
- Species: C. montana

Binomial name
- Chenistonia montana (Raven, 1984)

Synonyms
- Aname montana Raven, 1984

Species of spider

Chenistonia montana is a species of mygalomorph spider in the Anamidae family. It is endemic to Australia. It was described in 1984 by Australian arachnologist Robert Raven.

== Distribution and habitat ==
The species occurs in eastern New South Wales.
