= Aname pallida =

Scientific classification
- Kingdom: Animalia
- Phylum: Arthropoda
- Subphylum: Chelicerata
- Class: Arachnida
- Order: Araneae
- Infraorder: Mygalomorphae
- Family: Anamidae
- Genus: Aname
- Species: A. pallida

Binomial name
- Aname pallida L.Koch, 1873

Synonyms
- Chenistonia giraulti Rainbow, 1914

Species of spider

Aname pallida, also known as the greater wishbone spider, is a species of mygalomorph spider in the Anamidae family. It is endemic to Australia. It was described in 1873 by German arachnologist Ludwig Carl Christian Koch.

== Distribution and habitat ==
The species occurs in eastern Queensland in open sclerophyll forest habitats, as well as in vine thickets in coastal areas. The type locality is Bowen.

== Behaviour ==
The spiders are fossorial, terrestrial predators.
