= Teyl heuretes =

Scientific classification
- Kingdom: Animalia
- Phylum: Arthropoda
- Subphylum: Chelicerata
- Class: Arachnida
- Order: Araneae
- Infraorder: Mygalomorphae
- Family: Anamidae
- Genus: Teyl
- Species: T. heuretes

Binomial name
- Teyl heuretes Huey, Rix, Wilson, Hillyer & Harvey, 2019

Species of spider

Teyl heuretes is a species of mygalomorph spider in the Anamidae family. It is endemic to Australia. It was described in 2019 by Joel Huey, Michael Rix, Jeremy Wilson, Mia Hillyer and Mark Harvey.

== Distribution and habitat ==
The species occurs in the Pilbara region of north-west Western Australia. The type locality is the Weeli Wolli Creek area in the Hamersley Range.
