= Kwonkan silvestris =

Scientific classification
- Kingdom: Animalia
- Phylum: Arthropoda
- Subphylum: Chelicerata
- Class: Arachnida
- Order: Araneae
- Infraorder: Mygalomorphae
- Family: Anamidae
- Genus: Kwonkan
- Species: K. silvestris

Binomial name
- Kwonkan silvestris Main, 1983

Species of spider

Kwonkan silvestris is a species of mygalomorph spider in the Anamidae family. It is endemic to Australia. It was described in 1983 by Australian arachnologist Barbara York Main.

== Distribution and habitat ==
The species occurs in southern Western Australia in woodland and low scrub habitats. The type locality is Juranda, near Balladonia. It also occurs in the Fraser Range.

== Behaviour ==
The spiders are fossorial predators.
