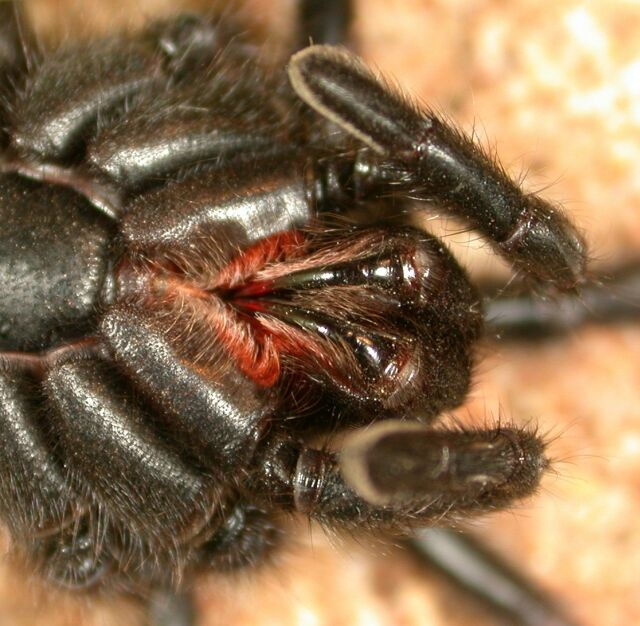
- Fangs of A. atra

Scientific classification
- Kingdom: Animalia
- Phylum: Arthropoda
- Subphylum: Chelicerata
- Class: Arachnida
- Order: Araneae
- Infraorder: Mygalomorphae
- Family: Anamidae
- Genus: Aname
- Species: A. atra

Binomial name
- Aname atra (Strand, 1913)

Synonyms
- Chenistonia atra Strand, 1913; Sungenia atra

= Aname atra =

Species of spider

Aname atra, the black wishbone spider, is a mygalomorph spider of Southern Australia. It is one of the wishbone spiders in the taxonomic family Anamidae, found in varied habitats throughout Australia, including Tasmania. The most common species are the mottled eastern wishbones in the genus Namea, found in rainforests, black wishbones in the genus Aname, found in drier parts of Queensland, and the bearded wishbone, Xamiatus magnificus, also found in Queensland.

== Name ==
They are called wishbone spiders for the shape of their burrow.
