= Teyl vancouveri =

Scientific classification
- Kingdom: Animalia
- Phylum: Arthropoda
- Subphylum: Chelicerata
- Class: Arachnida
- Order: Araneae
- Infraorder: Mygalomorphae
- Family: Anamidae
- Genus: Teyl
- Species: T. vancouveri

Binomial name
- Teyl vancouveri (Main, 1985)

Synonyms
- Pseudoteyl vancouveri Main, 1985

Species of spider

Teyl vancouveri is a species of mygalomorph spider in the Anamidae family. It is endemic to Australia. It was described in 1985 by Australian arachnologist Barbara York Main.

== Distribution and habitat ==
The species occurs in south-western Western Australia. The type locality is West Cape Howe, near the town of Albany.
