= Troglodiplura harrisi =

Scientific classification
- Kingdom: Animalia
- Phylum: Arthropoda
- Subphylum: Chelicerata
- Class: Arachnida
- Order: Araneae
- Infraorder: Mygalomorphae
- Family: Anamidae
- Genus: Troglodiplura
- Species: T. harrisi

Binomial name
- Troglodiplura harrisi Harvey & Rix, 2020

Species of spider

Troglodiplura harrisi is a species of troglomorphic spider in the family Anamidae, found in Western Australia, in caves on the Nullarbor Plain.

It was first described in 2020 by Mark Harvey and Michael Rix. The species epithet honours Richard Harris, for his contributions to cave diving and his role in the Tham Luang cave rescue of 2018.

The differences between this and other species in the genus has been demonstrated by close examination of fragments. Like other species in the genus, it has no eyes.
