= Teyl damsonoides =

Scientific classification
- Kingdom: Animalia
- Phylum: Arthropoda
- Subphylum: Chelicerata
- Class: Arachnida
- Order: Araneae
- Infraorder: Mygalomorphae
- Family: Anamidae
- Genus: Teyl
- Species: T. damsonoides

Binomial name
- Teyl damsonoides (Main, 1983)

Synonyms
- Merredinia damsonoides Main, 1983

Species of spider

Teyl damsonoides is a species of mygalomorph spider in the Anamidae family. It is endemic to Australia. It was described in 1983 by Australian arachnologist Barbara York Main.

== Distribution and habitat ==
The species occurs in inland south-western Western Australia in woodland, scrub and open heath habitats. The type locality is Lake Cronin in the Great Western Woodlands region.

== Behaviour ==
The spiders are fossorial terrestrial predators that dig deep sinuous burrows, stopped with soil plugs during the summer.
