= Swolnpes morganensis =

Scientific classification
- Kingdom: Animalia
- Phylum: Arthropoda
- Subphylum: Chelicerata
- Class: Arachnida
- Order: Araneae
- Infraorder: Mygalomorphae
- Family: Anamidae
- Genus: Swolnpes
- Species: S. morganensis

Binomial name
- Swolnpes morganensis Main & Framenau, 2009

Species of spider

Swolnpes morganensis is a species of mygalomorph spider in the Anamidae family. It is endemic to Australia. It was described in 2009 by Australian arachnologists Barbara York Main and Volker Framenau.

== Distribution and habitat ==
The species occurs in south-eastern Western Australia. The type locality is the Morgan Range, in the Great Victoria Desert.
