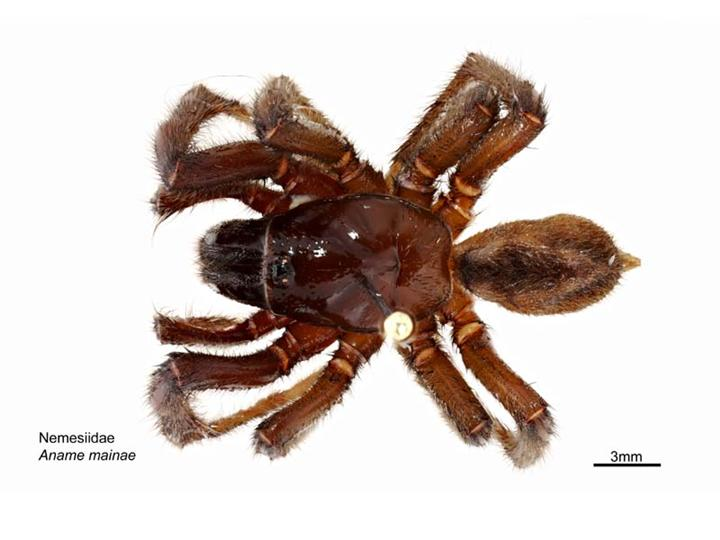

Scientific classification
- Kingdom: Animalia
- Phylum: Arthropoda
- Subphylum: Chelicerata
- Class: Arachnida
- Order: Araneae
- Infraorder: Mygalomorphae
- Family: Anamidae
- Genus: Aname
- Species: A. mainae

Binomial name
- Aname mainae Raven, 2000

= Aname mainae =

Species of spider

Aname mainae is a species of mygalomorph spider in the Anamidae family. It is endemic to Australia. It was described in 2000 by Australian arachnologist Robert Raven.

== Distribution and habitat ==
The species occurs in South Australia. The type locality is Elliston, on the west coast of the Eyre Peninsula.
