= Kwonkan wonganensis =

Scientific classification
- Kingdom: Animalia
- Phylum: Arthropoda
- Subphylum: Chelicerata
- Class: Arachnida
- Order: Araneae
- Infraorder: Mygalomorphae
- Family: Anamidae
- Genus: Kwonkan
- Species: K. wonganensis

Binomial name
- Kwonkan wonganensis (Main, 1977)

Synonyms
- Dekana wonganensis Main, 1977

Species of spider

Kwonkan wonganensis is a species of mygalomorph spider in the Anamidae family. It is endemic to Australia. It was described in 1977 by Australian arachnologist Barbara York Main.

== Distribution and habitat ==
The species occurs in south-west Western Australia, in the Avon Wheatbelt bioregion in open scrub habitats. The type locality is the Wongan Hills.

== Behaviour and ecology ==
The spiders are fossorial predators. They construct shallow, Y-shaped burrows in gravelly loam soils, with turrets of soil and pebbles at the entrances.
