= Aname ellenae =

Scientific classification
- Kingdom: Animalia
- Phylum: Arthropoda
- Subphylum: Chelicerata
- Class: Arachnida
- Order: Araneae
- Infraorder: Mygalomorphae
- Family: Anamidae
- Genus: Aname
- Species: A. ellenae

Binomial name
- Aname ellenae Harvey, Framenau, Wojcieszkek, Rix & Harvey, 2012

Species of spider

Aname ellenae is a species of mygalomorph spider in the Anamidae family. It is endemic to Australia. It was described in 2012 by Frances Harvey, Volker Framenau, Janine Wojcieszkek, Michael Rix and Mark Harvey. The specific epithet ellenae honours Ellen Harvey, the sister of the senior author.

== Distribution and habitat ==
The species occurs in north-west Western Australia along the northern coast of the Pilbara region, as well as along the Fortescue Marshes in the central Pilbara. The type locality is Aquila Onslow, 25 km south-east of Onslow.
