= Teyl luculentus =

Scientific classification
- Kingdom: Animalia
- Phylum: Arthropoda
- Subphylum: Chelicerata
- Class: Arachnida
- Order: Araneae
- Infraorder: Mygalomorphae
- Family: Anamidae
- Genus: Teyl
- Species: T. luculentus

Binomial name
- Teyl luculentus Main, 1975

Species of spider

Teyl luculentus, also known as the citrine spider, is a species of mygalomorph spider in the Anamidae family. It is endemic to Australia. It was described in 1975 by Australian arachnologist Barbara York Main, and is the type species of the genus.

== Distribution and habitat ==
The species occurs in inland south-western Western Australia in low open woodland and open scrub habitats. They are found mainly in Eucalyptus loxophleba and Acacia acuminata plant communities around granite outcrops, and in summer-dry Melaleuca bogs. The type locality is 14.5 km north of the town of Bruce Rock in the Wheatbelt.

== Behaviour ==
The spiders are fossorial terrestrial predators.
