= Teyl =

Scientific classification
- Kingdom: Animalia
- Phylum: Arthropoda
- Subphylum: Chelicerata
- Class: Arachnida
- Order: Araneae
- Infraorder: Mygalomorphae
- Family: Anamidae
- Genus: Teyl; Main, 1975

Species
- 28, see text.

Synonyms
- Merredinia Main, 1983; Pseudoteyl Main, 1985

Genus of spiders

Teyl is a genus of spiders in the family Anamidae. It is endemic to Australia. It is one of the genera that was placed in the former tribe Teylini (now included in the Anamidae). The type species is T. luculentus.

== Description ==
Species of this genus range from 2 to 10 mm in carapace length.

== Species ==
As of October 2026 it contains twenty-eight species:

- Teyl beaufortia Rix, Wilson & Harvey, 2023 — Western Australia
- Teyl brydensis Rix, Wilson & Harvey, 2023 — Western Australia
- Teyl caurinus Rix, Wilson & Harvey, 2023 — Western Australia
- Teyl damsonoides (Main, 1983) — Western Australia
- Teyl danksi Rix, Wilson & Harvey, 2023 — Western Australia
- Teyl faceyi Rix, Wilson & Harvey, 2023 — Western Australia
- Teyl harveyi Main, 2004 — Victoria
- Teyl heuretes Huey, Rix, Wilson, Hillyer & Harvey, 2019 — Western Australia
- Teyl howensis Rix, Wilson & Harvey, 2023 — Western Australia
- Teyl humphreysi Rix, Wilson & Harvey, 2023 — Western Australia
- Teyl ignicans Rix, Wilson & Harvey, 2023 — Western Australia
- Teyl kwonganensis Rix, Wilson & Harvey, 2023 — Western Australia
- Teyl lengae Rix, Wilson & Harvey, 2023 — Western Australia
- Teyl loxleyae Rix, Wilson & Harvey, 2023 — Western Australia
- Teyl luculentus Main, 1975 — Western Australia
- Teyl maculatus (Rainbow & Pulleine, 1918) — Western Australia
- Teyl melindae Rix, Wilson & Harvey, 2023 — Western Australia
- Teyl meridionalis Rix, Wilson & Harvey, 2023 — Western Australia
- Teyl nadineae Rix, Wilson & Harvey, 2023 — Western Australia
- Teyl narrikupensis Rix, Wilson & Harvey, 2023 — Western Australia
- Teyl regalis Rix, Wilson & Harvey, 2023 — Western Australia
- Teyl saffarae Rix, Wilson & Harvey, 2023 — Western Australia
- Teyl sampeyae Rix, Wilson & Harvey, 2023 — Western Australia
- Teyl tealei Rix, Wilson & Harvey, 2023 — Western Australia
- Teyl undulites Rix, Wilson & Harvey, 2023 — Western Australia
- Teyl vancouveri (Main, 1985) — Western Australia
- Teyl walkeri Main, 2004 — Victoria
- Teyl yeni Main, 2004 — Victoria

== Distribution ==
The genus occurs in south-western Australia as well as the Eyre Peninsula and western Victoria. Its distribution was likely fragmented in southern Australia during the Cretaceous inundation of central Australia. The radiation of the genus in south-western Australia has probably resulted from the continuing isolation of relictual habitats which have retained aspects of Gondwanan conditions.

== Names ==
The genus name is an Australian Aboriginal word meaning a brightly coloured stone - thus the reference is to the glabrous (shiny) bright texture of the spider's integument.

The specific name luculentus of the type species refers to the shining yellowish colour. T. harvey is named as a tribute to Mark S. Harvey, T. walkeri after Ken Walker, T. yeni after Alan Yen.
