= Teyloides =

Scientific classification
- Kingdom: Animalia
- Phylum: Arthropoda
- Subphylum: Chelicerata
- Class: Arachnida
- Order: Araneae
- Infraorder: Mygalomorphae
- Family: Anamidae
- Genus: Teyloides
- Species: T. bakeri

Binomial name
- Teyloides bakeri Main, 1985

Genus of spiders

Teyloides is a genus of spiders in the family Anamidae. It was first described in 1985 by Australian arachnologist Barbara York Main. As of 2017, it contains only one Australian species, Teyloides bakeri.

== Distribution and habitat ==
The species occurs in South Australia. The type locality is Englebrook Reserve, Bridgewater, in the Adelaide Hills.
