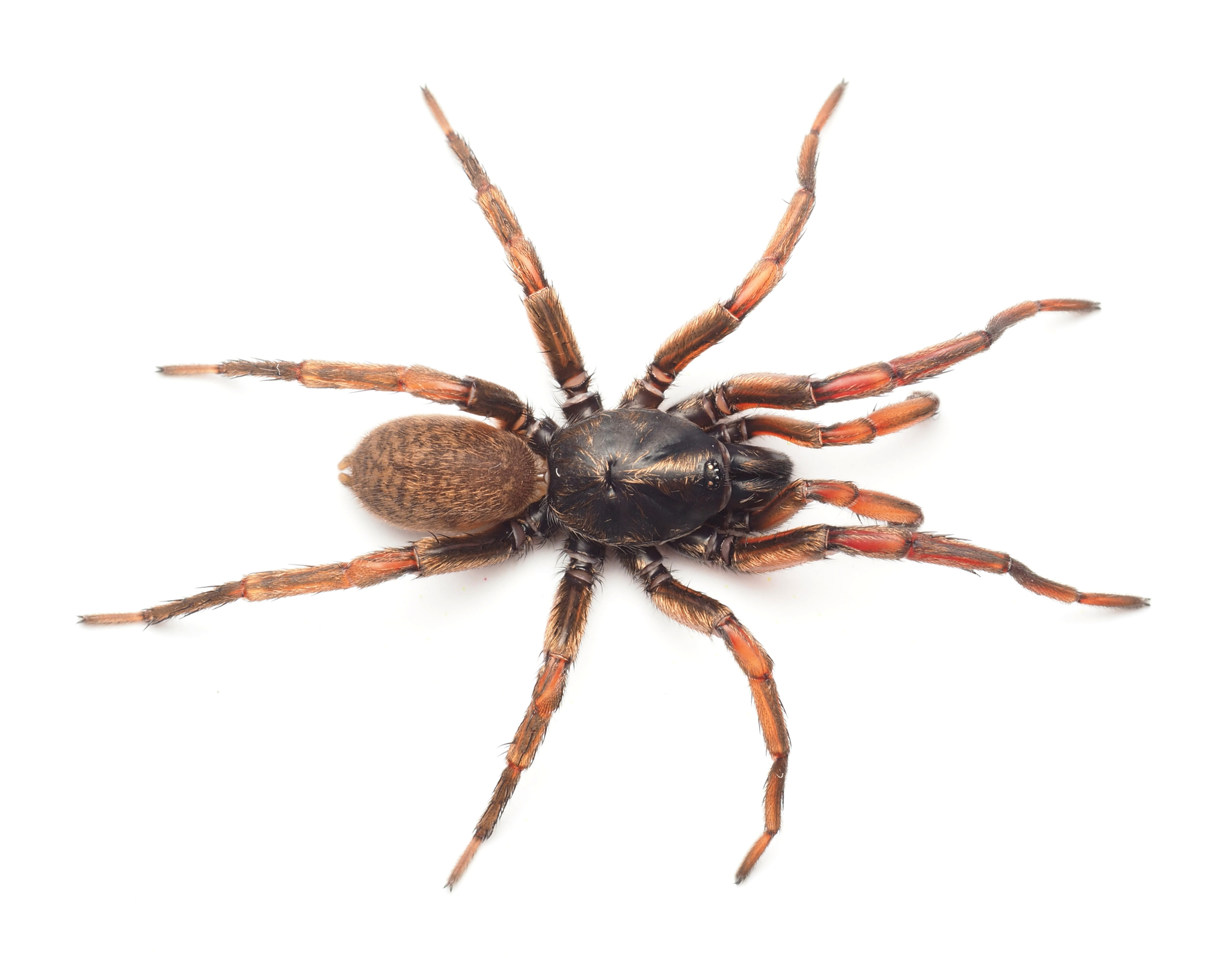

Scientific classification
- Kingdom: Animalia
- Phylum: Arthropoda
- Subphylum: Chelicerata
- Class: Arachnida
- Order: Araneae
- Infraorder: Mygalomorphae
- Family: Anamidae
- Genus: Namea
- Species: N. nigritarsus

Binomial name
- Namea nigritarsus Rix, Wilson & Harvey, 2020

= Namea nigritarsus =

Species of spider

Namea nigritarsus, also known as the black-footed wishbone spider, is a species of mygalomorph spider in the family Anamidae. It is endemic to Australia. It was first described in 2020 by Michael Rix, Jeremy Wilson and Mark Harvey.

== Distribution and habitat ==
The species occurs in south-eastern Queensland in subtropical rainforest habitats. The type locality is Mount Glorious in the D'Aguilar Range near Brisbane.
