= Swolnpes =

Scientific classification
- Domain: Eukaryota
- Kingdom: Animalia
- Phylum: Arthropoda
- Subphylum: Chelicerata
- Class: Arachnida
- Order: Araneae
- Infraorder: Mygalomorphae
- Family: Anamidae
- Genus: Swolnpes; Main & Framenau, 2009

Genus of spiders

Swolnpes is a genus of spiders in the family Anamidae. It was first described in 2009 by Barbara York Main and Volker Framenau. It is endemic to Australia.

== Species ==
- Swolnpes darwini Main & Framenau, 2009
- Swolnpes morganensis Main & Framenau, 2009
