= Hesperonatalius =

Scientific classification
- Kingdom: Animalia
- Phylum: Arthropoda
- Subphylum: Chelicerata
- Class: Arachnida
- Order: Araneae
- Infraorder: Mygalomorphae
- Family: Anamidae
- Genus: Hesperonatalius; Castalanelli, Huey, Hillyer & Harvey, 2017

Type species
- H. maxwelli Castalanelli, Huey, Hillyer & Harvey, 2017

Genus of spiders

Hesperonatalius is a genus of mygalomorph spiders in the family Anamidae. It is endemic to arid Western Australia. It was first described by Mark Castalanelli, Joel Huey, Mia Hillyer & Mark Harvey in 2017. As of October 2026 it contains three species.

== Species ==
- H. harrietae Castalanelli, Huey, Hillyer & Harvey, 2017
- H. langlandsi Castalanelli, Huey, Hillyer & Harvey, 2017
- H. maxwelli Castalanelli, Huey, Hillyer & Harvey, 2017
