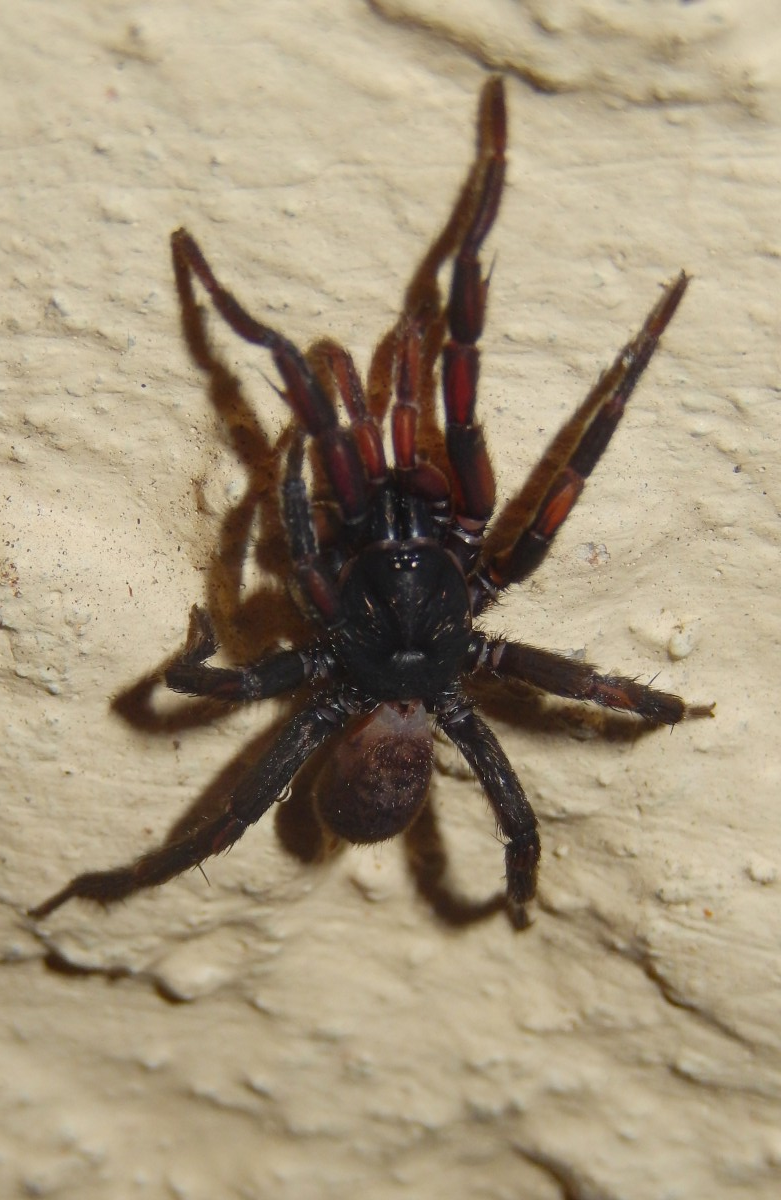
- male

Scientific classification
- Domain: Eukaryota
- Kingdom: Animalia
- Phylum: Arthropoda
- Subphylum: Chelicerata
- Class: Arachnida
- Order: Araneae
- Infraorder: Mygalomorphae
- Family: Anamidae
- Genus: Chenistonia
- Species: C. caeruleomontana

Binomial name
- Chenistonia caeruleomontana (Raven, 1984)

= Chenistonia caeruleomontana =

Blue Mountains wishbone spider

Species of spider

Chenistonia caeruleomontana is a ground spider (family Anamidae), found in New South Wales, Australia. Spiders in this group are called "wishbone spiders", for the shape of their open silk-lined burrow, which has the shape of the letter "Y", with one arm shorter than the other. Only the longer arm reaches the surface. The shorter arm is believed to allow the spider to survive flooding by trapping an air bubble.
