= Troglodiplura =

Scientific classification
- Kingdom: Animalia
- Phylum: Arthropoda
- Subphylum: Chelicerata
- Class: Arachnida
- Order: Araneae
- Infraorder: Mygalomorphae
- Family: Anamidae
- Genus: Troglodiplura; Main, 1969

Genus of spiders

Troglodiplura is a genus of Australian Anamidae spiders. Formerly monotypic, in 2020, four new species were added to the genus. The genus and type species, Troglodiplura lowryi, were first described by Barbara York Main in 1969. The genus has only been found in Australia, within the caves of the Nullarbor Plain.

The genus is considered one of the worlds most troglomorphic spiders with every species known lacking eyes and having elongated appendages. Troglodiplura differs from other genera in the Anamidae family by having an almost round carapace, by having no eyes, and by the male's having a longer palpal tarsus.

== Threats ==
T. lowryi is listed as "Vulnerable" under the Western Australian Biodiversity Conservation Act 2016. However, this assessment was prior to the work of Mark Harvey and Michael Rix who state that all species of Troglodiplura would qualify as "Endangered" or "Critically Endangered" under IUCN Criterion B (‘Geographic Range’). Additionally, some Nullarbor caves are experiencing major threats from human activities, with speleological features being damaged; animals and their homes being trampled and altered hydrological regimes due to changes in surface vegetation communities, and groundwater pollution.

== Species ==
As of October 2026, the World Spider Catalog accepted the following species:

- Troglodiplura beirutpakbarai Harvey & Rix, 2020 – Australia (South Australia)
- Troglodiplura challeni Harvey & Rix, 2020 – Australia (Western Australia)
- Troglodiplura harrisi Harvey & Rix, 2020 – Australia (Western Australia)
- Troglodiplura lowryi Main, 1969 (type species) – Australia (Western Australia)
- Troglodiplura samankunani Harvey & Rix, 2020 – Australia (Western Australia)
