= Chenistonia =

Scientific classification
- Kingdom: Animalia
- Phylum: Arthropoda
- Subphylum: Chelicerata
- Class: Arachnida
- Order: Araneae
- Infraorder: Mygalomorphae
- Family: Anamidae
- Genus: Chenistonia; Hogg, 1901

Type species
- Chenistonia maculata

Species
- 8, see text

Genus of spiders

Chenistonia is a genus of spiders in the family Anamidae. It was first described in 1901 by Henry Roughton Hogg. As of October 2026, it contains 8 species, all from Australia.

== Species ==
Chenistonia comprises 8 species:

- Chenistonia boranup Main, 2012 — Australia (Western Australia)
- Chenistonia caeruleomontana (Raven, 1984) — Australia (New South Wales)
- Chenistonia earthwatchorum (Raven, 1984) — Australia (Queensland)
- Chenistonia hickmani (Raven, 1984) — Australia (New South Wales)
- Chenistonia maculata Hogg, 1901 — Australia (Victoria)
- Chenistonia montana (Raven, 1984) — Australia (New South Wales)
- Chenistonia trevallynia Hickman, 1926 — Australia (Tasmania)
- Chenistonia tropica (Raven, 1984) — Australia (Queensland)
