= Aname =

- Aname ningaloo

Scientific classification
- Kingdom: Animalia
- Phylum: Arthropoda
- Subphylum: Chelicerata
- Class: Arachnida
- Order: Araneae
- Infraorder: Mygalomorphae
- Family: Anamidae
- Genus: Aname; L. Koch, 1873

Species
- 138, See text.

Genus of spiders

Aname is a genus of mygalomorph spiders. It is endemic to Australia. The spiders, as well as some in closely related genera, are also known as wishbone spiders. It was first described by Ludwig Koch in 1873.

== Diagnosis ==
Aname species may be distinguished from other genera in the family by the presence of a prominent asetose ventral depression on the male pedipalpal tibia.

== Distribution and habitat ==
While Aname prefers dry open country and occurs throughout much of Australia (though mostly inland), Chenistonia occurs mostly in South and Western Australia, and Namea is only known along the east coast in rainforests.

The lesser wishbone spider (Aname distincta) occurs through the lowland open forests of south-east Queensland's Moreton Valley as far north as Eidsvold and Gayndah, and the greater wishbone spider (Aname pallida) from Gladstone along dry coastal corridors to Cairns. One species (Aname tasmanica) is found only in Tasmania.

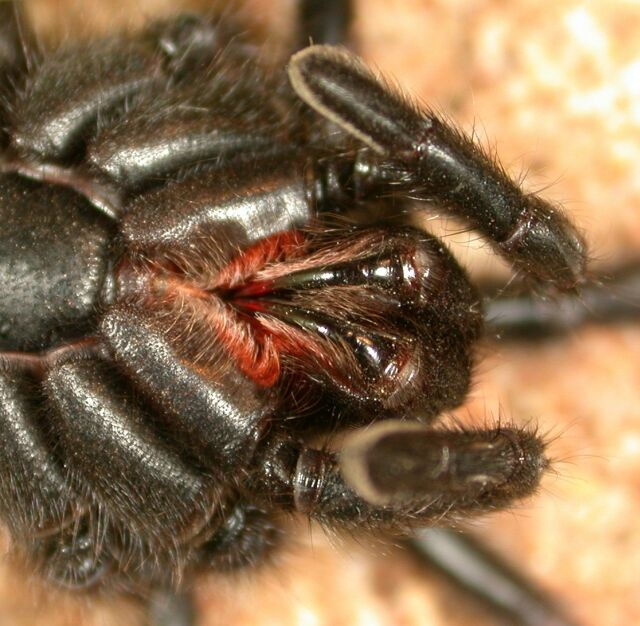
Fangs of Aname atra

== Behaviour ==
Spiders in this genus, together with the very similar genera Chenistonia and Namea, are called "wishbone spiders", for the shape of their open silk-lined burrow, which has the shape of the letter "Y", with one arm shorter than the other. Only the longer arm reaches the surface. The shorter arm is believed to allow the spider to survive flooding by trapping an air bubble.

=== Interactions with humans ===
Bites from Aname are rare, but females of Aname inimica (which are also considered "unfriendly" by Aboriginal Australians) are reported to have bitten several people, resulting in local pain, redness and soreness.

== Species ==
As of October 2026, the World Spider Catalog accepts 138 species:

- A. albicula Wilson, Havey, Simmons & Rix, 2025 —New South Wales
- A. amabilis Wilson, Rix & Harvey, 2025 — Western Australia
- A. ammolithica Wilson, Harvey, Simmons & Rix, 2025 — Queensland
- A. aragog Harvey, Framenau, Wojcieszek, Rix & Harvey, 2012 — Western Australia
- A. arenicosta Wilson, Rix & Harvey, 2025 — Western Australia
- A. atra (Strand, 1913) — South Australia
- A. attenuata (Rainbow & Pulleine, 1918) — Queensland
- A. aurantella Wilson, Harvey, Simmons & Rix, 2025 — Queensland
- A. aurea Rainbow & Pulleine, 1918 — New South Wales
- A. aurensis Wilson, Havey, Simmons & Rix, 2025 — Queensland
- A. auromellosa Wilson, Rix & Harvey, 2025 — Western Australia
- A. baileyorum Castalanelli, Framenau, Huey, Hillyer & Harvey, 2020 — Western Australia
- A. barakula Wilson, Havey, Simmons & Rix, 2025 — Queensland
- A. barrema Raven, 1985 — Queensland
- A. bifaceta Wilson, Havey, Simmons & Rix, 2025 — Queensland
- A. blackdownensis Raven, 1985 — Queensland
- A. boreoarca Wilson, Rix & Harvey, 2025 — Western Australia
- A. boreovillosa Wilson, Havey, Simmons & Rix, 2025 — Queensland
- A. braemar Wilson, Havey, Simmons & Rix, 2025 — Queensland
- A. briggsi Wilson, Havey, Simmons & Rix, 2025 — Queensland
- A. broadwater Wilson, Havey, Simmons & Rix, 2025 — Queensland
- A. calida Wilson, Havey, Simmons & Rix, 2025 — Queensland
- A. callitra Wilson, Havey, Simmons & Rix, 2025 — New South Wales
- A. camara Raven, 1985 — Queensland
- A. carina Raven, 1985 — Queensland
- A. cassowariensis Wilson, Havey, Simmons & Rix, 2025 — Queensland
- A. charlesdarwini Wilson, Rix & Harvey, 2025 — Western Australia
- A. coenosa Rainbow & Pulleine, 1918 — South Australia
- A. collinsorum Raven, 1985 — Queensland
- A. comosa Rainbow & Pulleine, 1918 — South Australia
- A. consuelo Wilson, Havey, Simmons & Rix, 2025 — Queensland
- A. convoluta Wilson, Havey, Simmons & Rix, 2025 — Queensland
- A. corundaria Wilson, Havey, Simmons & Rix, 2025 — Queensland
- A. cowani Wilson, Rix & Harvey, 2025 — Western Australia
- A. crassitibia Piccinini, Harvey, Rix, Simmons & Wilson, 2025 — Western Australia
- A. cudmore Wilson, Havey, Simmons & Rix, 2025 — Queensland
- A. dimissa Wilson, Rix & Harvey, 2025 — Western Australia
- A. dingo Wilson, Havey, Simmons & Rix, 2025 — Queensland
- A. distincta (Rainbow, 1914) — Queensland
- A. distorta Wilson, Havey, Simmons & Rix, 2025 — Queensland
- A. diversicolor (Hogg, 1902) — South Australia, Western Australia
- A. eddieorum Wilson, Havey, Simmons & Rix, 2025 — Queensland, New South Wales
- A. elegans (Harvey, Wilson & Rix, 2022) — South Australia
- A. ellenae Harvey, Framenau, Wojcieszek, Rix & Harvey, 2012 — Western Australia
- A. eowilsoni Wilson, Rix & Harvey, 2025 — Western Australia
- A. ethabuka Wilson, Havey, Simmons & Rix, 2025 — Queensland
- A. eurarca Wilson, Rix & Harvey, 2025 — Western Australia
- A. exulans Harvey & Huey, 2020 — Western Australia
- A. ferruginea Wilson, Havey, Simmons & Rix, 2025 — Queensland
- A. flexicaudula Wilson, Havey, Simmons & Rix, 2025 — Queensland
- A. fossoria Wilson, Havey, Simmons & Rix, 2025 — Queensland
- A. frostorum Castalanelli, Framenau, Huey, Hillyer & Harvey, 2020 — Western Australia
- A. fuscochelicera Wilson, Havey, Simmons & Rix, 2025 — Queensland, New South Wales
- A. geminata Wilson, Rix & Harvey, 2025 — Western Australia
- A. gilbertensis Wilson, Havey, Simmons & Rix, 2025 — Queensland
- A. grandis Rainbow & Pulleine, 1918 — South Australia
- A. grothi Castalanelli, Framenau, Huey, Hillyer & Harvey, 2020 — Western Australia
- A. harmoniosa Wilson, Havey, Simmons & Rix, 2025 — Queensland
- A. hetaera Urso, Harvey, Rix & Wilson, 2025 — Western Australia
- A. hirsuta Rainbow & Pulleine, 1918 — South Australia
- A. hughenden Wilson, Havey, Simmons & Rix, 2025 — Queensland
- A. humptydoo Raven, 1985 — Northern Territory
- A. inexpecta Piccinini, Harvey, Rix, Simmons & Wilson, 2025 — Western Australia
- A. inglewood Wilson, Havey, Simmons & Rix, 2025 — Queensland
- A. inimica Raven, 1985 — New South Wales, Queensland
- A. insolita Wilson, Havey, Simmons & Rix, 2025 — Queensland
- A. intermedia Wilson, Havey, Simmons & Rix, 2025 — Queensland
- A. isabelae Wilson, Rix & Harvey, 2025 — Western Australia
- A. jillae Wilson, Rix & Harvey, 2025 — Western Australia
- A. kaii Wilson, Rix & Harvey, 2025 — Western Australia
- A. kirrama Raven, 1984 — Queensland
- A. lambkinae Wilson, Havey, Simmons & Rix, 2025 — Queensland
- A. lawrenceae Wilson, Havey, Simmons & Rix, 2025 — Queensland
- A. lillianae Harvey & Huey, 2020 — Western Australia
- A. litoralis Wilson, Havey, Simmons & Rix, 2025 — New South Wales
- A. longitheca Raven, 1985 — Queensland
- A. lorica Castalanelli, Framenau, Huey, Hillyer & Harvey, 2020 — Western Australia
- A. magnifica Wilson, Havey, Simmons & Rix, 2025 — New South Wales
- A. maculata (Rainbow & Pulleine, 1918) — Western Australia
- A. mainae Raven, 2000 — South Australia
- A. marae Harvey, Framenau, Wojcieszek, Rix & Harvey, 2012 — Western Australia
- A. mariala Wilson, Havey, Simmons & Rix, 2025 — Queensland
- A. mcalpinei Castalanelli, Framenau, Huey, Hillyer & Harvey, 2020 — Western Australia
- A. mccleeryorum Harvey & Huey, 2020 — Western Australia
- A. mellosa Harvey, Framenau, Wojcieszek, Rix & Harvey, 2012 — Western Australia
- A. minuta Piccinini, Harvey, Rix, Simmons & Wilson, 2025 — Western Australia
- A. mulgana Wilson, Havey, Simmons & Rix, 2025 — Queensland, New South Wales
- A. munyardae Castalanelli, Framenau, Huey, Hillyer & Harvey, 2020 — Western Australia
- A. nacta Wilson, Rix & Harvey, 2025 — Western Australia
- A. namoi Wilson, Havey, Simmons & Rix, 2025 — New South Wales
- A. nigrochelicera Wilson, Havey, Simmons & Rix, 2025 — Queensland
- A. nigrotarsa Wilson, Havey, Simmons & Rix, 2025 — Queensland
- A. ningaloo Wilson, Rix & Harvey, 2023 — Western Australia
- A. nitidimarina Castalanelli, Framenau, Huey, Hillyer & Harvey, 2020 — Western Australia
- A. occivillosa Wilson, Havey, Simmons & Rix, 2025 — Queensland
- A. olkola Wilson, Havey, Simmons & Rix, 2025 — Queensland
- A. pallida L. Koch, 1873 (type) — Queensland
- A. phillipae Harvey & Huey, 2020 — Western Australia
- A. platensis Wilson, Havey, Simmons & Rix, 2025 — Queensland
- A. platypus (L. Koch, 1875) — Australia
- A. primarena Wilson, Rix & Harvey, 2025 — Western Australia
- A. prospecta Wilson, Rix & Harvey, 2025 — Western Australia
- A. pulchella (Harvey, Wilson & Rix, 2022) — Western Australia
- A. pyroensis Wilson, Havey, Simmons & Rix, 2025 — Queensland
- A. reliquia Piccinini, Harvey, Rix, Simmons & Wilson, 2025 — Western Australia
- A. robertsorum Raven, 1985 — Queensland
- A. rubrochelicera Wilson, Havey, Simmons & Rix, 2025 — Queensland
- A. rupicola Wilson, Havey, Simmons & Rix, 2025 — Queensland
- A. salina Wilson, Rix & Harvey, 2023 — Western Australia
- A. sangeri Wilson, Rix & Harvey, 2025 — Western Australia
- A. savannella Wilson, Havey, Simmons & Rix, 2025 — Queensland
- A. savannensis Wilson, Havey, Simmons & Rix, 2025 — Queensland
- A. scutitheca Wilson, Havey, Simmons & Rix, 2025 — Queensland
- A. senticosa Wilson, Rix & Harvey, 2025 — Western Australia
- A. serpentina Wilson, Havey, Simmons & Rix, 2025 — Queensland
- A. simoneae Harvey & Huey, 2020 — Western Australia
- A. simplex Wilson, Rix & Harvey, 2025 — Western Australia
- A. sinuata Castalanelli, Framenau, Huey, Hillyer & Harvey, 2020 — Western Australia
- A. spicata Piccinini, Harvey, Rix, Simmons & Wilson, 2025 — Western Australia
- A. tacenda Wilson, Rix & Harvey, 2025 — Western Australia
- A. taracta Wilson, Rix & Harvey, 2025 — Western Australia
- A. tasmanica Hogg, 1902 — Tasmania
- A. tatarnici Wilson, Rix & Harvey, 2023 — South Australia
- A. tenuipes Wilson, Rix & Harvey, 2023 — Western Australia
- A. terminata Wilson, Rix & Harvey, 2025 — Western Australia
- A. tigrina Raven, 1985 — Queensland
- A. trapezoidallis Piccinini, Harvey, Rix, Simmons & Wilson, 2025 — Western Australia
- A. tropicana Wilson, Havey, Simmons & Rix, 2025 — Queensland
- A. truncata Wilson, Havey, Simmons & Rix, 2025 — Queensland
- A. vernonorum Castalanelli, Framenau, Huey, Hillyer & Harvey, 2020 — Western Australia
- A. vigilata Wilson, Havey, Simmons & Rix, 2025 — Queensland
- A. viridiensis Wilson, Havey, Simmons & Rix, 2025 — Queensland
- A. wanjarri Wilson, Rix & Harvey, 2025 — Western Australia
- A. warialda Raven, 1985 — New South Wales, Queensland
- A. warrengo Wilson, Havey, Simmons & Rix, 2025 — Queensland
- A. watsoni Castalanelli, Framenau, Huey, Hillyer & Harvey, 2020 — Western Australia
- A. whitei Castalanelli, Framenau, Huey, Hillyer & Harvey, 2020 — Western Australia
- A. wongalara Wilson, Rix & Harvey, 2023 — Northern Territory
- A. zephyrarca Wilson, Rix & Harvey, 2025 — Western Australia
