= Pulleine =

Pulleine is an English surname. Notable people with the surname include:

- Henry Pulleine (1838–1879), English army officer
- John Pulleine (1841–1913), English Anglican bishop
- Robert Henry Pulleine (1869–1935), Australian physician and naturalist
