= Mark Harvey =

Australian rules footballer, born 1965

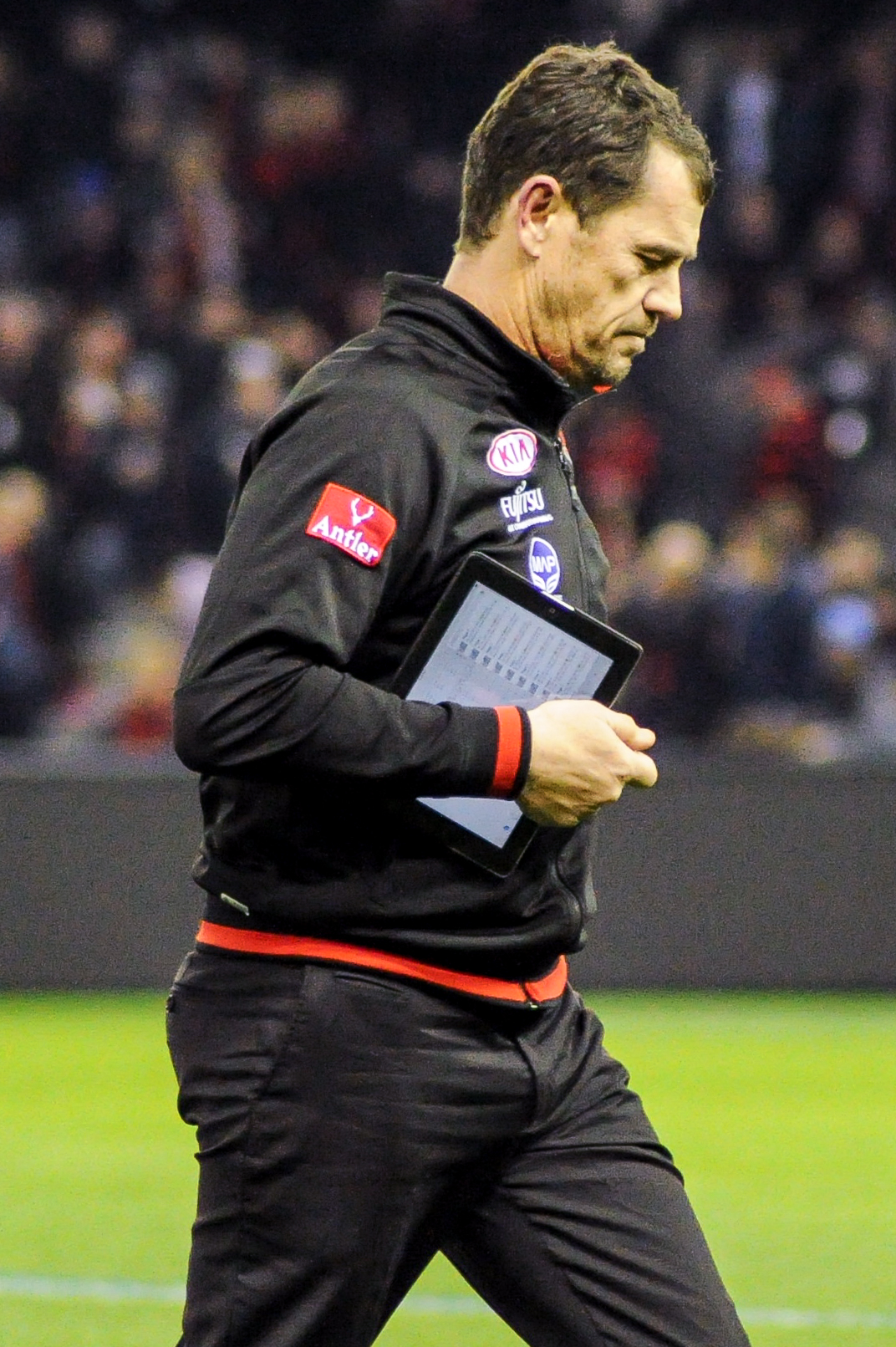
- Harvey in June 2017

Personal information
- Full name: Mark Harvey
- Born: 11 June 1965 (age 61)
- Original team: Keilor (EDFL)
- Height: 184 cm (6 ft 0 in)
- Weight: 88 kg (194 lb)

Playing career^{1}
Years	Club	Games (Goals)
1984–1997	Essendon	206 (170)

Representative team honours
Years	Team	Games (Goals)
1985–1994	Victoria	

Coaching career^{3}
Years	Club	Games (W–L–D)
2007–2011	Fremantle	97 (39–58–0)
2013	Brisbane Lions	3 (2–1–0)
Total		100 (41–59–0)
- ^{1} Playing statistics correct to the end of 1997.^{3} Coaching statistics correct as of 2013.

Career highlights
- 3× VFL/AFL premiership: 1984, 1985, 1993; 2× All-Australian team: 1985, 1993; W. S. Crichton Medal: 1992; Essendon leading goalkicker: 1985

Mark Harvey (born 11 June 1965) is a former Australian rules football player and coach. He played over 200 games during fourteen seasons with Essendon, winning three premierships, and was senior coach of Fremantle from 2007 to 2011. In August 2013, he took over as interim senior coach of the Brisbane Lions following the resignation of Michael Voss as senior coach. From 2015 until 2020, Harvey served as an assistant coach at Essendon.

== Playing career ==
=== Essendon ===
Harvey played for Essendon for a total of fourteen seasons from 1984 until 1997, playing a total of 206 games where he kicked 171 goals.

Harvey was originally known as a skilful forward, playing that role in the 1984 and 1985 premiership sides, including kicking seven goals in a record win over Carlton in 1985. He was also the side's leading goalkicker for that 1985 season, an unusual feat for a medium-sized forward in a premiership winning team. However, injuries in his later career (particularly to his ankles) meant he was used more as a defender, which reduced the stress on his body. In his role as a defender he often played as centre half-back against much taller opponents, making up for his lack of height with his aggressive attack on the football.

Harvey finished in the top five of the Essendon best-and-fairest on four occasions, winning the award in 1992. He was named in the All-Australian team in 1985 and 1993; he also played in premiership sides both those years as well as in 1984. In 2002 he was named as the 18th greatest player to play for the club in the "Champions of Essendon" list.

After Harvey announced his retirement from his playing career at the end of the 1997 season, Harvey was given an emotional farewell by his team-mates after a narrow Round 22, 1997 victory over Adelaide Crows at Princes Park.

In 2001 Harvey admitted that he suffered from bulimia for 3 to 4 years of his playing career, after he gained weight following a broken leg.

In 2025 Harvey was named at Number 12 in Don The Stat's Top 100 Essendon Players Since 1980.

== Coaching career ==
=== Essendon Football Club assistant coach (1998–2005) ===
Harvey retired as player at the end of the 1997 season, after realising injuries had taken their toll on his body and he could no longer contribute to the side in the way he would like. He remained at Essendon as an assistant coach under senior coach Kevin Sheedy. In the years since he was often suggested as a possible senior coach. At the end of the 2004 season, Harvey was a front-runner for a number of coaching jobs, but either wasn't offered or chose not to take each of them, and continued to be an assistant at Essendon. However, after the end of the 2005 season, Harvey resigned as Essendon assistant coach.

=== Fremantle assistant coach (2006–2007) ===
Harvey then took up a job as an assistant coach at Fremantle under senior coach Chris Connolly. He helped Fremantle have their most successful season to date in the 2006 season, reaching the preliminary final.

=== Fremantle Football Club senior coach (2007–2011) ===
Following a poor start to the 2007 season, Chris Connolly resigned as senior coach after Round 15, when Dockers lost to the Kangaroos by four points, with the Dockers sitting at thirteenth position on the ladder with six wins and nine losses. Harvey was then appointed the caretaker senior coach of Fremantle Football Club for the remainder of the 2007 season. Harvey made his debut as the senior coach for the first time against Adelaide at AAMI Stadium on 21 July 2007. Fremantle performed very well, scoring their highest ever score in South Australia and winning by 25 points. Harvey led Fremantle to win four of the seven remaining games in the 2007 season, but it wasn't enough to make the finals, finishing in eleventh place.

On 17 September 2007, it was announced that Harvey would be re-appointed as the senior coach of Fremantle on a contract for the next three seasons.

The 2008 season did not start well for Harvey with Fremantle only winning twice in the first thirteen rounds, including a demoralising loss to the previously winless Melbourne despite leading by 50 points at half time in round seven. At the end of the 2008 season, Fremantle under Harvey finished fourteenth on the ladder with six wins and sixteen losses. The following year at the end of the 2009 season Fremantle under Harvey finished fourteenth on the ladder yet again with six wins and sixteen losses.

In the 2010 season, Harvey returned Fremantle to the finals after a three-year absence. Fremantle won its first three matches of a season for the first time ever; which culminated in an upset seven-point victory over the previous season's premiers, Geelong. But late in the season, Harvey rested up to half of his regular side ahead of a match against Hawthorn in Launceston and the result was a 116-point defeat, just one point off their record margin loss of 117 points suffered against Adelaide just a season earlier. But against the same opponents a fortnight later, the Dockers won its first finals match under Harvey, and its first since 2006, with a win by 5 goals. Fremantle's 2010 season under Harvey ended in a disappointing defeat to Geelong at the MCG a week later.

In the 2011 season, Fremantle under Harvey finished eleventh on the ladder with nine wins and thirteen losses, missing out of the finals. Despite being praised for his efforts in attempting to field a fit Fremantle side late in the season when the club was suffering one of the worst injury tolls in the AFL, Harvey was unexpectedly sacked as Fremantle senior coach on 15 September 2011. He was replaced by former St Kilda senior coach Ross Lyon who on the same night of Harvey's dismissal had resigned from his post as Saints senior coach.

=== Brisbane Lions assistant coach (2012–2013) ===
In November 2011, Harvey signed on as a senior assistant coach to the Brisbane Lions under senior coach Michael Voss for the 2012 season and the 2013 season.

=== Brisbane Lions caretaker senior coach (2013) ===
On 13 August 2013, Harvey was appointed caretaker senior coach of the Brisbane Lions for the remainder of the 2013 season, replacing Michael Voss who had been told his contract would not be renewed. Voss then opted not to coach out his contract which expired at the end of the 2013 season. Harvey led the Lions to wins in two of the remaining three games as they finished in twelfth position on the ladder. He was not retained as senior coach and quit following the 2013 season after the Lions appointed Justin Leppitsch for the 2014 season. Harvey then returned to Perth.

=== Essendon Football Club assistant coach (2015–2020) ===
On 22 October 2014, Harvey announced that he would return to Essendon as an assistant coach. At the end of the 2020 season, Harvey stepped down from his role as assistant coach of the Bombers.

== Post-coaching career ==
For the 2021 season, Harvey transitioned out of coaching and into a dual role at Essendon that works across both sides of the football department and administration.

== Statistics ==
=== Playing statistics ===
Legend
G	Goals	K	Kicks	D	Disposals	T	Tackles
B	Behinds	H	Handballs	M	Marks
#	Played in that season's premiership team

Season	Team	No.	Games	Totals							Averages (per game)							Votes
Season	Team	No.	Games	G	B	K	H	D	M	T	G	B	K	H	D	M	T	Votes
1984^{#}	Essendon	38	16	28	23	210	39	249	73	—N/a	1.8	1.4	13.1	2.4	15.6	4.6	—N/a	6
1985^{#}	Essendon	38	24	48	34	354	121	475	138	—N/a	2.0	1.4	14.8	5.0	19.8	5.8	—N/a	7
1986	Essendon	38	20	21	24	258	72	330	90	—N/a	1.1	1.2	12.9	3.6	16.5	4.5	—N/a	0
1987	Essendon	1	1	0	0	1	0	1	0	0	0.0	0.0	1.0	0.0	1.0	0.0	0.0	0
1988	Essendon	1	15	14	10	243	58	301	82	26	0.9	0.7	16.2	3.9	20.1	5.5	1.7	0
1989	Essendon	1	12	11	10	150	57	207	51	16	0.9	0.8	12.5	4.8	17.3	4.3	1.3	2
1990	Essendon	1	13	16	14	163	26	189	59	13	1.2	1.1	12.5	2.0	14.5	4.5	1.0	0
1991	Essendon	1	12	17	13	164	41	205	78	13	1.4	1.1	13.7	3.4	17.1	6.5	1.1	0
1992	Essendon	1	22	1	1	344	89	433	98	24	0.0	0.0	15.6	4.0	19.7	4.5	1.1	2
1993^{#}	Essendon	1	22	7	4	385	109	494	122	25	0.3	0.2	17.5	5.0	22.5	5.5	1.1	5
1994	Essendon	1	8	1	1	124	46	170	43	10	0.1	0.1	15.5	5.8	21.3	5.4	1.3	1
1995	Essendon	1	11	0	1	136	33	169	44	5	0.0	0.1	12.4	3.0	15.4	4.0	0.5	0
1996	Essendon	1	24	5	4	313	99	412	105	39	0.2	0.2	13.0	4.1	17.2	4.4	1.6	3
1997	Essendon	1	6	1	2	55	25	80	27	2	0.2	0.3	9.2	4.2	13.3	4.5	0.3	0
Career			206	170	141	2900	815	3715	1010	173	0.8	0.7	14.1	4.0	18.0	4.9	1.2	26

== Head coaching record ==
Team	Year	Home and Away Season					Finals			
Team	Year	Won	Lost	Drew	Win %	Position	Won	Lost	Win %	Result
FRE	2007	4	3	0	.571	11th out of 16	—	—	—	—
FRE	2008	6	16	0	.273	14th out of 16	—	—	—	—
FRE	2009	6	16	0	.273	14th out of 16	—	—	—	—
FRE	2010	13	9	0	.591	6th out of 16	1	1	.500	Lost to Geelong in Semi Final
FRE	2011	9	13	0	.409	11th out of 17	—	—	—	—
FRE Total		38	57	0	.400		1	1	.500	
BRI	2013	2 (Note: Harvey took over as interim head coach after Michael Voss was fired following round 20 with a record of 8–11, leading the Lions to a 2–1 record in their final three games. Thus, the first 19 games are credited to Voss and the final three to Harvey.)	1	0	.667	12th out of 18	—	—	—	—
BRI Total		2	1	0	.667		0	0	.000	
Total		40	58	0	.408		1	1	.500	

== Champions of Essendon ==
In 2002 an Essendon panel ranked him at 18 in their Champions of Essendon list of the 25 greatest players ever to have played for Essendon.

== Personal life ==
Harvey was involved in a nightclub fight in Darwin, Northern Territory on 17 June 2007 when he was king hit and knocked unconscious. This followed Fremantle's loss to Western Bulldogs and on the same night as Chris Tarrant was involved in an altercation with Jason McCartney.

On 13 June 2010 The Age journalist Emma Quayle revealed in her book on former Essendon player Adam Ramanauskas Nine Lives: football, cancer and getting on with life that Harvey had, 10 years earlier, suffered from a brain tumour. Following successful treatment, Harvey has remained in remission ever since.
