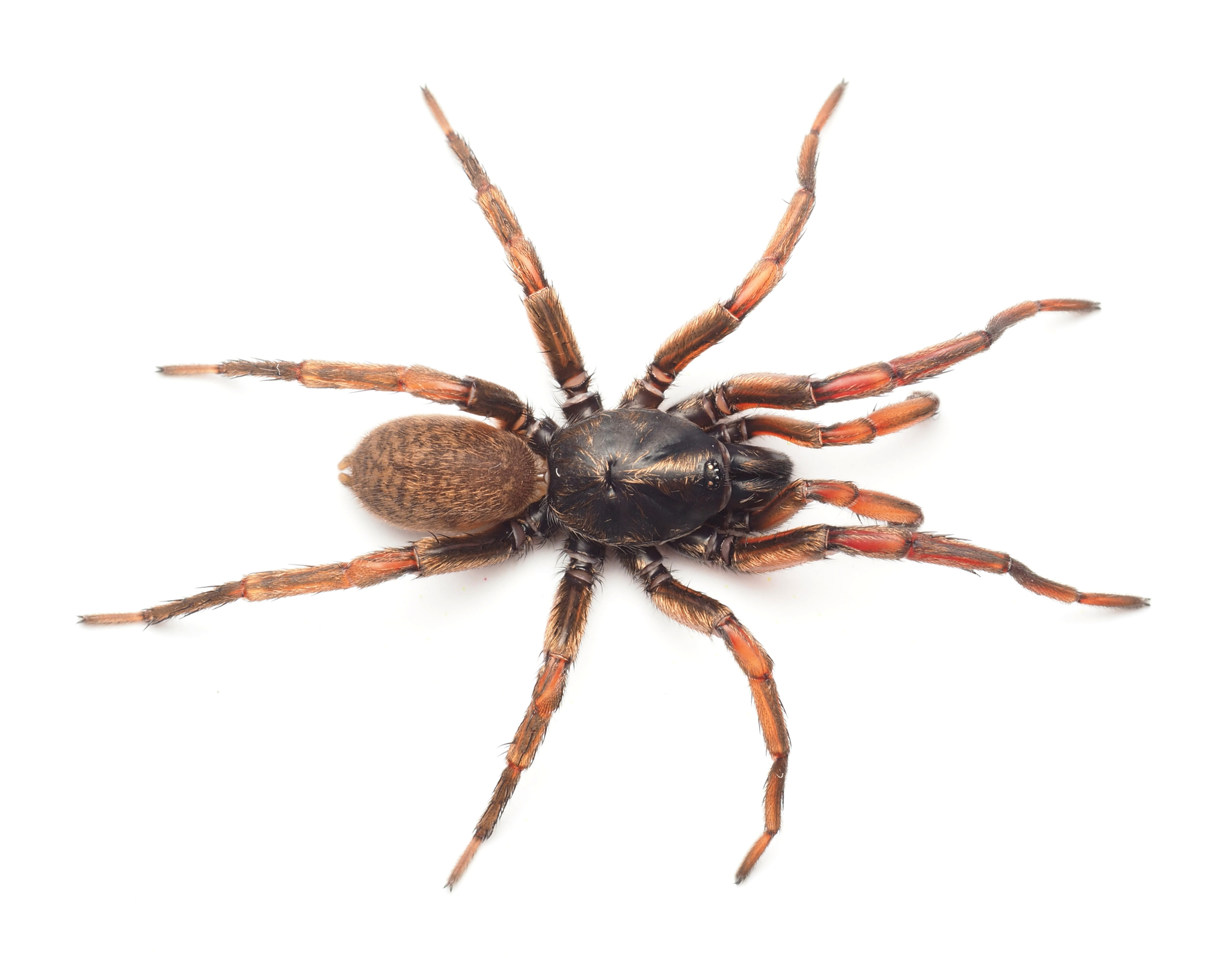
- Namea nigritarsus
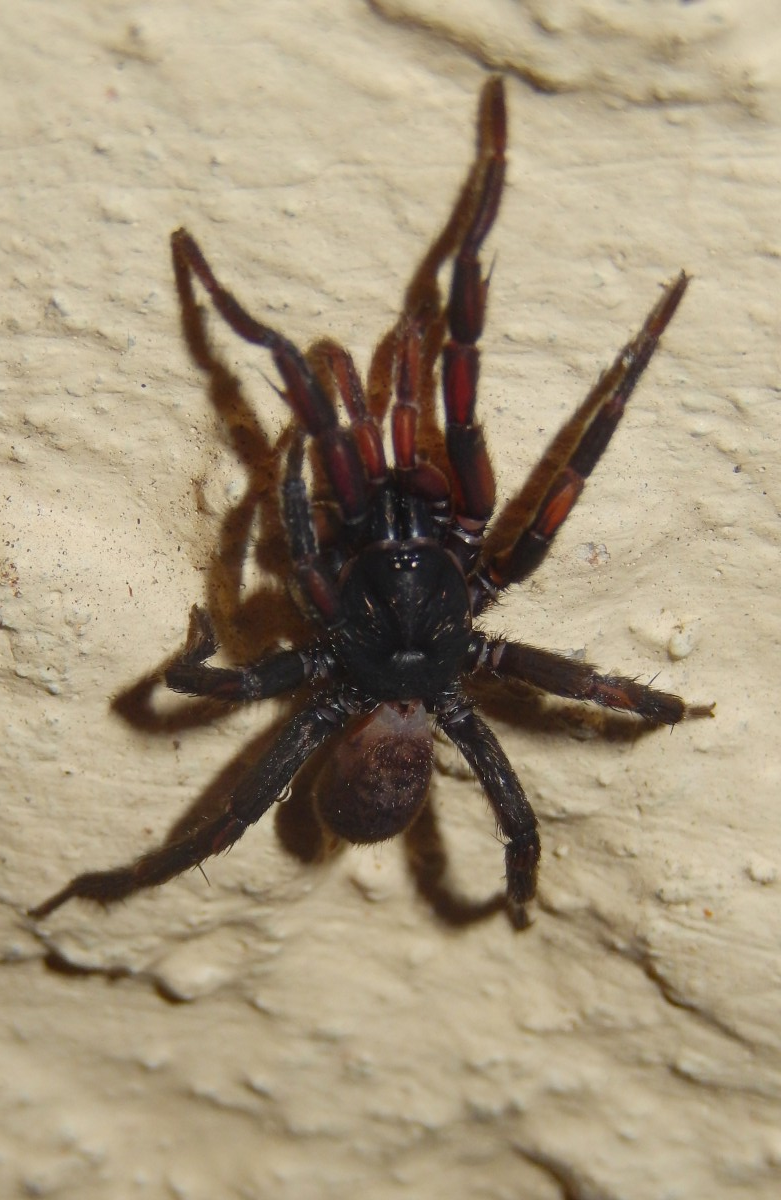
- Male Chenistonia caeruleomontana

Scientific classification
- Kingdom: Animalia
- Phylum: Arthropoda
- Subphylum: Chelicerata
- Class: Arachnida
- Order: Araneae
- Infraorder: Mygalomorphae
- Clade: Avicularioidea
- Family: Anamidae; Simon, 1889

Diversity
- 10 genera, 234 species
- blue: reported countries (WSC)

= Anamidae =

Family of spiders

Anamidae is a family of Australian mygalomorph spiders. It was first described as a tribe by Simon in 1889, then raised to the subfamily Anaminae of the family Nemesiidae, before being raised to a family level by Opatova et al. in 2020.

== Distribution ==
All members of the family are endemic to Australia.

== Taxonomy ==
The tribe Anamini was first described by Eugène Simon in 1899. In 1982, Barbara York Main distinguished the tribe Teylini from the tribe Anamini by technical differences, including a narrow band of cuspules on the maxillae and the absence of a spine-bearing spur on the first tibia of males (except in Teyloides). A molecular phylogenetic study in 2018 found that Anamini excluding Teylini was not monophyletic, and so merged the former Teylini into Anamini, placing the tribe in the subfamily Anaminae of the family Nemesiidae. In 2020, Opatova et al. raised the group to the rank of family, including all nine genera previously placed in the Anamini.

== Genera ==
As of October 2026, this family includes ten genera and 234 species. A 2018 molecular phylogenetic study divided them into four informal groups.

- Teyl group
  - Teyl Main, 1975
  - Namea Raven, 1984
- Chenistonia group
  - Chenistonia Hogg, 1901
  - Proshermacha Simon, 1908
  - Teyloides Main, 1985
- Kwonkan group
  - Kwonkan Main, 1983
  - Swolnpes Main & Framenau, 2009
- Aname group
  - Aname L. Koch, 1873
  - Hesperonatalius Castalanelli, Huey, Hillyer & Harvey, 2017
- Unplaced
  - Troglodiplura Main, 1969
