= Yorkrakine Rock =

Granite rock formation In Western Australia

Coordinates: 31°25′17″S 117°30′49″E

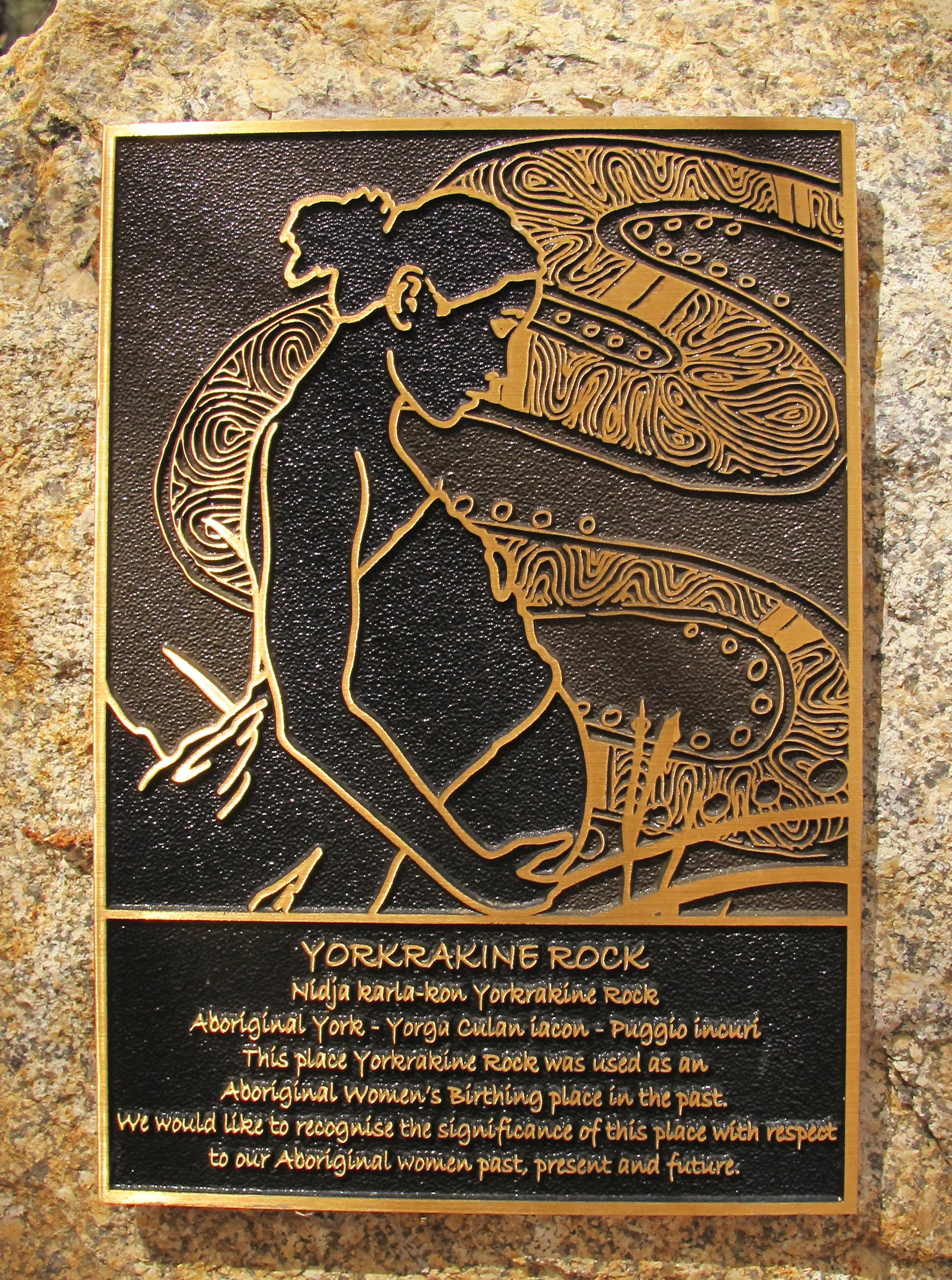
Aboriginal women's birthing place memorial plaque

Yorkrakine Rock is a granite rock formation located approximately 25 km (16 mi) north of Tammin and 50 km (31 mi) south-east of Dowerin in the eastern Wheatbelt region of Western Australia.

== History ==
The traditional owners are the Noongar peoples. The area was used by Noongar women as a birthing site. Many children, and possibly women, who did not survive childbirth have been buried there. A plaque commemorating the women who gave birth there, as well as the children born, and the women and children who did not survive, has been placed at the site.

== Geography ==
The rock forms part of the Yorkrakine Rock Nature Reserve and is located on the Tammin Wyalkatchem Road. It is about 10 km (6 mi) south of the old Yorkrakine townsite. It is 341 m (1,119 ft) in height and occupies an area of 160 ha (400 acres). The base of the rock, the outcrop's apron, is good habitat for flora and fauna and is surrounded by York gum and mangart woodlands.

The reserve and most of the Wheatbelt are situated on the granites and granitic gneisses of the Yilgarn Block of the Precambrian Shield.

== Flora and fauna ==
Flora found around the site include: Eucalyptus orbifolia, Eucalyptus loxophleba, Acacia acuminata and Eucalyptus platycorys. Both Acacia yorkrakinensis and Grevillea yorkrakinensis are named for the area.

Native mammals found at the site include the common wallaroo, common dunnart and short-beaked echidna. Raptors found on the reserve include the brown goshawk, little eagle, wedge-tailed eagle, peregrine falcon and brown falcon, along with eastern barn owl and tawny frogmouth. The banded lapwing, laughing dove and domestic pigeon are also found at the site. Parrots include the regent parrot, Australian ringneck and mulga parrot, and the galah and rainbow bee-eater have also been observed.

Other animals may be endemic to the area. The critically endangered trapdoor spider Kwonkan eboracum was first collected there, and it is the site of the only known records of the species. A pseudoscorpion species, Synsphyronus elegans is only known to occur at exfoliated slabs on the rock. Introduced species found are black rat, European rabbit and red fox.

== Access ==
The reserve has access roads and parking as well as toilets and picnic tables, but camping is not permitted.

== See also ==
- Granite outcrops of Western Australia
