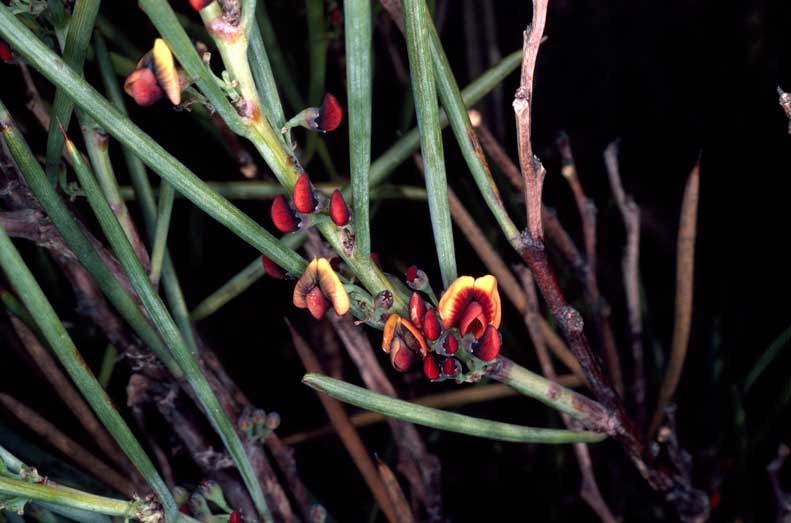
- Near Quairading

Conservation status
- Priority Four — Rare Taxa (DEC)

Scientific classification
- Kingdom: Plantae
- Clade: Tracheophytes
- Clade: Angiosperms
- Clade: Eudicots
- Clade: Rosids
- Order: Fabales
- Family: Fabaceae
- Subfamily: Faboideae
- Genus: Daviesia
- Species: D. oxylobium

Binomial name
- Daviesia oxylobium Crisp

= Daviesia oxylobium =

Species of flowering plant

Daviesia oxylobium is a species of flowering plant in the family Fabaceae and is endemic to the south-west of Western Australia. It is an erect, bushy shrub with sharply-pointed, cylindrical phyllodes, and yellow and pinkish-red flowers.

== Description ==
Daviesia oxylobium is an erect, glaucous, bushy shrub that typically grows to a height of up to about 1 m (3 ft 3 in). Its phyllodes are crowded, erect and club-shaped to cylindrical, 20–70 mm (0.79–2.76 in) long and 1.0–1.5 mm (0.039–0.059 in) wide with a sharply pointed tip. The flowers are arranged in leaf axils in up to three groups of three to five, each group on a peduncle 1.0–1.5 mm (0.039–0.059 in) long, the rachis 1–4 mm (0.039–0.157 in) long, each flower on a pedicel 1–3 mm (0.039–0.118 in) long with triangular bracts at the base. The sepals are 2.5–3.0 mm (0.098–0.118 in) long and joined for most of their length apart from five small teeth. The standard petal is broadly egg-shaped with a notched centre, 4.0–5.5 mm (0.16–0.22 in) long and 5.5–6.0 mm (0.22–0.24 in) wide, and yellow with a deep pinkish-red base. The wings are about 5 mm (0.20 in) long and pinkish-red, the keel 4.0–4.5 mm (0.16–0.18 in) long and dark red. Flowering occurs in July and August and the fruit is an inflated, triangular pod 14–18 mm (0.55–0.71 in) long.

== Taxonomy and naming ==
Daviesia oxylobium was first formally described in 1995 by Michael Crisp in Australian Systematic Botany from specimens he collected near Quairading in 1980. The specific epithet (oxylobium) means "a sharp pod".

== Distribution and habitat ==
This daviesia grows in kwongan or woodland between Quairading, Corrigin, Bruce Rock and Yorkrakine in the Avon Wheatbelt and Jarrah Forest biogeographic regions of south-western Western Australia.

== Conservation status ==
Daviesia oxylobium is listed as "Priority Four" by the Government of Western Australia Department of Biodiversity, Conservation and Attractions, meaning that it is rare or near threatened.
