= Acacia puncticulata =

Scientific classification
- Kingdom: Plantae
- Clade: Tracheophytes
- Clade: Angiosperms
- Clade: Eudicots
- Clade: Rosids
- Order: Fabales
- Family: Fabaceae
- Subfamily: Caesalpinioideae
- Clade: Mimosoid clade
- Genus: Acacia
- Species: A. puncticulata

Binomial name
- Acacia puncticulata Maslin
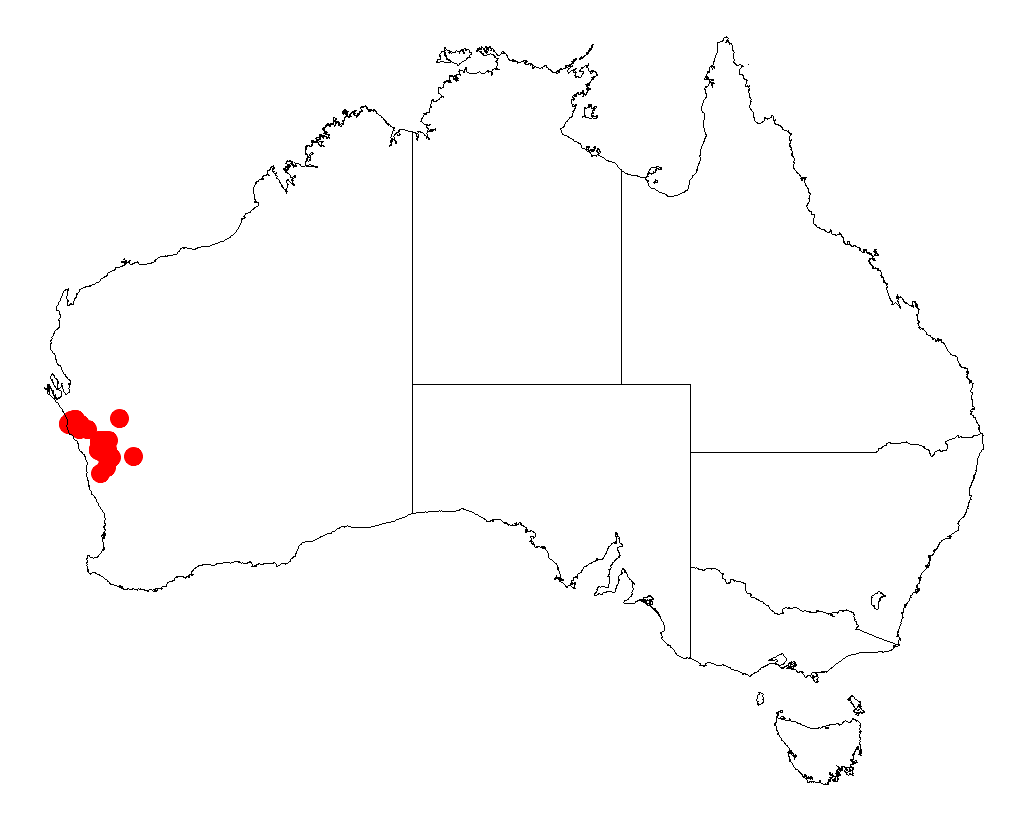
- Occurrence data from AVH

Species of legume

Acacia puncticulata is a shrub of the genus Acacia and the subgenus Phyllodineae that is endemic to an area along the west coast of Australia.

== Description ==
The spreading diffuse shrub typically grows to a height of 0.5 to 1.8 metres (2 to 6 ft) and has many branches. The hairy branchlets have a white-grey coloured epidermis that becomes fissured with age and spinose and straight stipules with a length of 2 to 4 mm (0.079 to 0.157 in) and often have hardened bases persisting. Like many species of Acacia it has phyllodes rather than true leaves. The coriaceous, shiny, dark green and patent phyllodes have an ovate to widely elliptic shape and usually have a length of 1.5 to 2.5 cm (0.59 to 0.98 in) and a width of 7 to 15 mm (0.28 to 0.59 in) and has a prominent midrib. It blooms from August to September and produces yellow flowers. The inflorescences occur singly in the axils and have spherical to obloid shaped flower-heads containing 35 to 60 golden coloured flowers. After flowering seed pods form that have a spirally coiled shape. The coriaceous and glabrous seed pods have a width of 4.5 to 5.5 mm (0.18 to 0.22 in) and contain dull black to brown seeds with an oblong shape and a length of 3.5 mm (0.14 in).

== Distribution ==
It is native to an area in the Wheatbelt and Mid West regions of Western Australia where it is commonly situated on sandplains, rocky granite hills and outcrops growing in rocky and loamy or sandy soils. The shrub has a discontinuous distribution from around Perenjori and Three Springs in the south east to the Murchison River in the north west usually as a part of tall shrubland communities often in association with Acacia acuminata.

== See also ==
- List of Acacia species
