= Mungat =

Mungat may be:

- the Noongar name of Acacia acuminata
- the pronunciation of Montgat, a town in Spain
