= Acacia longispinea =

Scientific classification
- Kingdom: Plantae
- Clade: Tracheophytes
- Clade: Angiosperms
- Clade: Eudicots
- Clade: Rosids
- Order: Fabales
- Family: Fabaceae
- Subfamily: Caesalpinioideae
- Clade: Mimosoid clade
- Genus: Acacia
- Species: A. longispinea

Binomial name
- Acacia longispinea Morrison
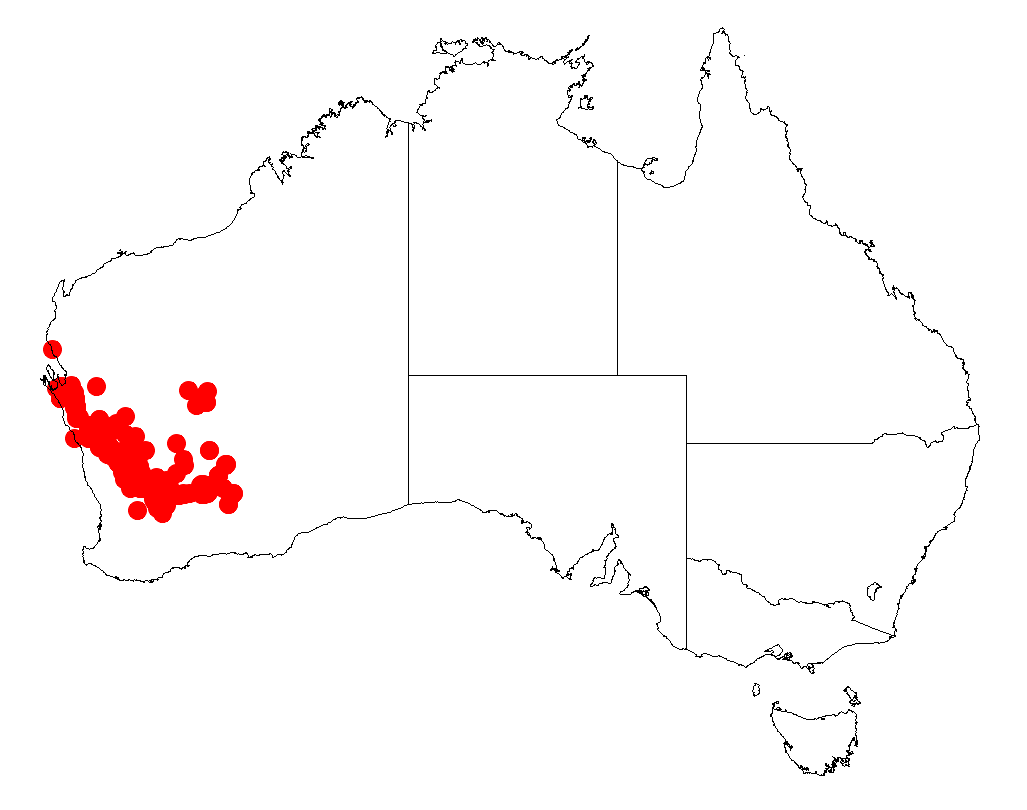
- Occurrence data from AVH

Synonyms
- Acacia longispinea Morrison isonym; Racosperma longispineum (Morrison) Pedley

Species of legume

Habit, near Maya

Acacia longispinea is a species of flowering plant in the family Fabaceae and is endemic to the southwest of Western Australia. It is a shrub with terete branchlets, ascending to erect, sharply pointed phyllodes, spherical heads of golden yellow flowers, and pendent, linear pods raised over the seeds.

== Description ==
Acacia longispinea is a shrub that typically grows to a height of 2–5 m (6 ft 7 in – 16 ft 5 in) with terete, glabrous branchlets scarred by raised stem-projections where phyllodes have fallen. Its phyllodes are ascending to erect, straight to slightly curved, 70–235 mm (2.8–9.3 in) long, 1–2.5 mm (0.039–0.098 in) wide, glabrous and sharply pointed with five strongly raised veins. There is a gland 2–14 mm (0.079–0.551 in) above the base of the phyllodes and the pulvinus is much reduced. The flowers are borne in a spherical head in axils on peduncles 9–20 mm (0.35–0.79 in) long, each head 6–8 mm (0.24–0.31 in) in diameter with 60 to 85 golden yellow flowers. Flowering occurs in September and October, and the pods are pendent, linear and straight, up to 75 mm (3.0 in) long, 4–8 mm (0.16–0.31 in) wide, papery and glabrous, raised over and sometimes constricted between the seeds. The seeds are broadly egg-shaped to nearly circular, 3–6 mm (0.12–0.24 in) long, dull and mottled without an aril.

== Taxonomy ==
Acacia longispinea was first formally described in 1912 by Alexander Morrison in The Scottish Botanical Review from specimens collected in Kununoppin by "F.E.Victor". The specific epithet (longispinea) means 'long thorny'.

== Distribution ==
This species of wattle mostly grows in sand in scrub and clay sand on or clay loam in shrubland from near Hamelin and south-east to Narembeen and Boorabbin. There are outliers at Albion Downs, Comet Vale and Spargoville (about 45 km (28 mi) south of Coolgardie), in the Avon Wheatbelt, Carnarvon, Coolgardie, Geraldton Sandplains, Murchison and Yalgoo bioregions of south-western Western Australia.

== See also ==
- List of Acacia species
