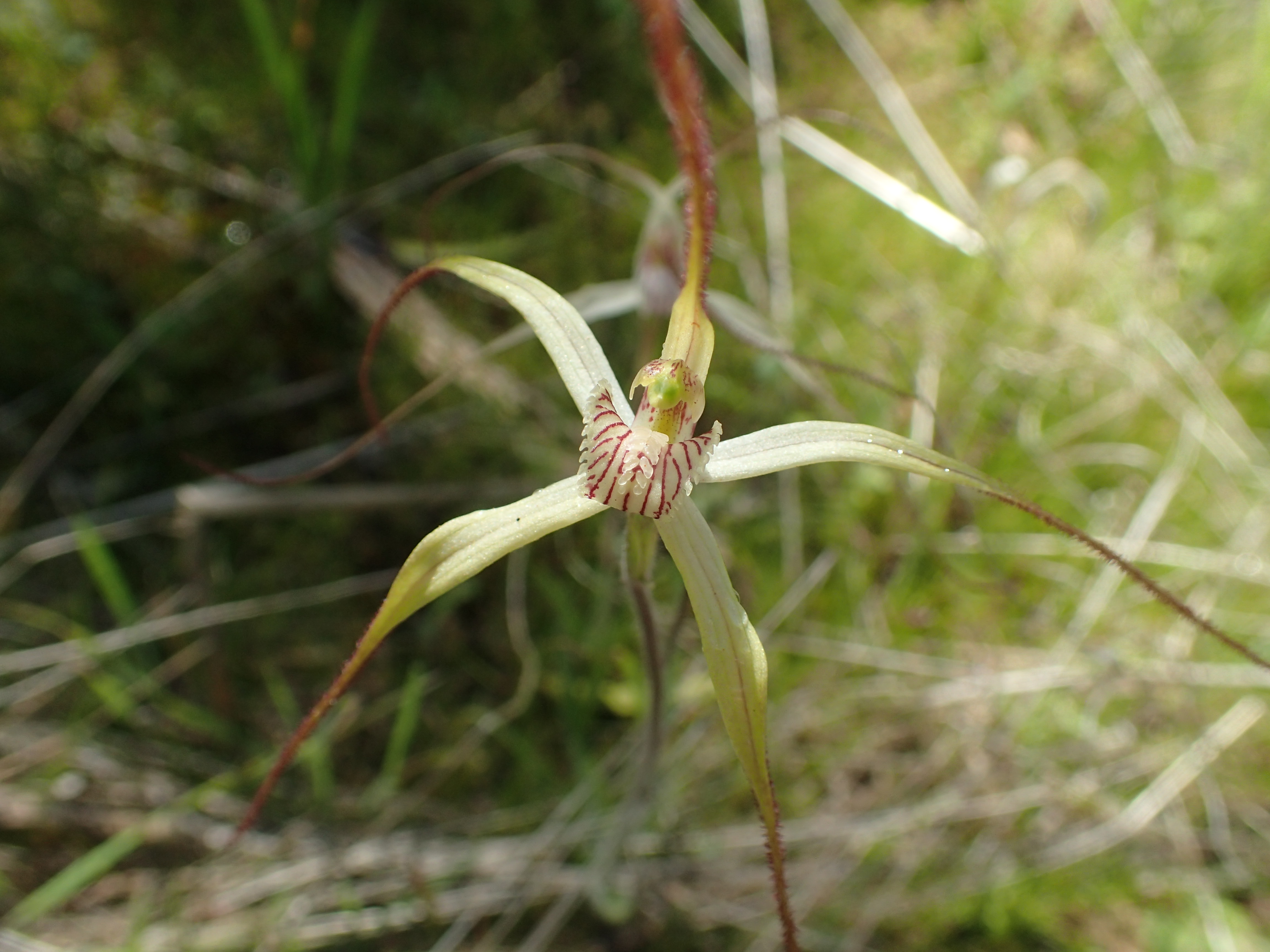

Scientific classification
- Kingdom: Plantae
- Clade: Tracheophytes
- Clade: Angiosperms
- Clade: Monocots
- Order: Asparagales
- Family: Orchidaceae
- Subfamily: Orchidoideae
- Tribe: Diurideae
- Genus: Caladenia
- Species: C. exilis

Binomial name
- Caladenia exilis Hopper & A.P.Br.

Synonyms
- Caladenia exilis Paczk. & A.R.Chapm. nom. inval.; Calonema exile (Hopper & A.P.Br.) D.L.Jones & M.A.Clem.; Calonema exilis D.L.Jones & M.A.Clem. orth. var.; Calonemorchis exilis (Hopper & A.P.Br.) D.L.Jones & M.A.Clem.; Jonesiopsis exilis (Hopper & A.P.Br.) D.L.Jones & M.A.Clem.

= Caladenia exilis =

Species of orchid

Caladenia exilis is a species of flowering plant in the orchid family Orchidaceae and is endemic to the south-west of Western Australia. It is a ground orchid with a single erect, linear leaf and up to three white to greenish-cream or dark pinkish-maroon flowers.

== Description ==
Caladenia exilis is a terrestrial, perennial, deciduous, sympodial herb with a single, erect, linear leaf 40–100 mm (1.6–3.9 in) long and 4–7 mm (0.16–0.28 in) wide. The plant is 60–250 mm (2.4–9.8 in) high with up to three white to greenish-cream or dark pinkish maroon flowers, with two rows of red to cream-coloured calli along the mid-line of the labellum. The flowers are 60–150 mm (2.4–5.9 in) long and 40–60 mm (1.6–2.4 in) wide.

== Taxonomy and naming ==
Caladenia exilis was first formally described in 2001 by Stephen Hopper and Andrew Phillip Brown in the journal Nuytsia from specimens collected near Nyabing by Robert Bates in 1990. The specific epithet (exilis) means "slender", "alluding to the slender labellum, petals and sepals".

In the same journal Hopper and Andrew Brown described two subspecies of C. exilis, and the names are accepted by the Australian Plant Census:

- Caladenia exilis Hopper & A.P.Br. subsp. exilis - salt lake spider orchid, has white to greenish-cream flowers with pale maroon markings.
- Caladenia exilis subsp. vanleeuwenii M.A.Clem. & Hopper - Moora spider orchid, has dark pinkish-maroon to cream-coloured or variegated flowers with prominent maroon markings.

== Distribution and habitat ==
Subspecies exilis grows near salt lakes between Mullewa and Woodanilling in the Avon Wheatbelt, Jarrah Forest and Mallee bioregions. Subspecies vanleeuwenii grows in winter-wet depressions in salmon gum and york gum woodland, or on granite outcrops, north and south of Moora in the Avon Wheatbelt and Jarrah Forest bioregions of south-western Western Australia.
