= Leioproctus pustulatus =

Scientific classification
- Kingdom: Animalia
- Phylum: Arthropoda
- Clade: Pancrustacea
- Class: Insecta
- Order: Hymenoptera
- Family: Colletidae
- Genus: Leioproctus
- Species: L. pustulatus

Binomial name
- Leioproctus pustulatus Batley, 2025

Species of bee

Leioproctus pustulatus, or Leioproctus (Euryglossidia) pustulatus, is a species of bee in the family Colletidae and subfamily Colletinae. It is endemic to Australia. It was described by entomologist Michael Batley in 2025.

== Etymology ==
The specific epithet pustulatus (Latin: "with a pimple") is an anatomical reference to the ventral margin of the clypeus.

== Description ==
The holotype female body length is 7.5 mm. Integumental colouration is mainly black, the metasoma chestnut. The hair is white to brown.

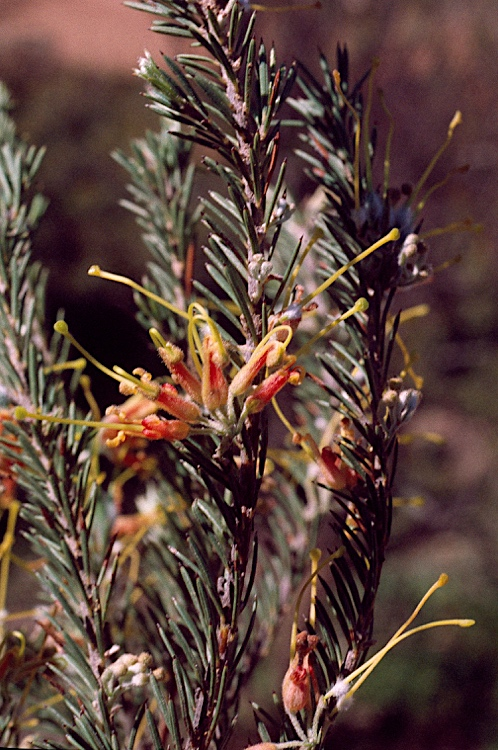
Grevillea yorkrakinensis, a forage plant of the bees

== Distribution and habitat ==
The species occurs in Western Australia. The type locality is 5 km south-east of Thundelarra in the Murchison region.

== Behaviour ==
The adults are flying mellivores. Flowering plants visited by the bees include Grevillea yorkrakinensis.
