= Yeerakine Rock =

Granite rock formation in Western Australia

Coordinates: 32°33′40″S 118°18′42″E

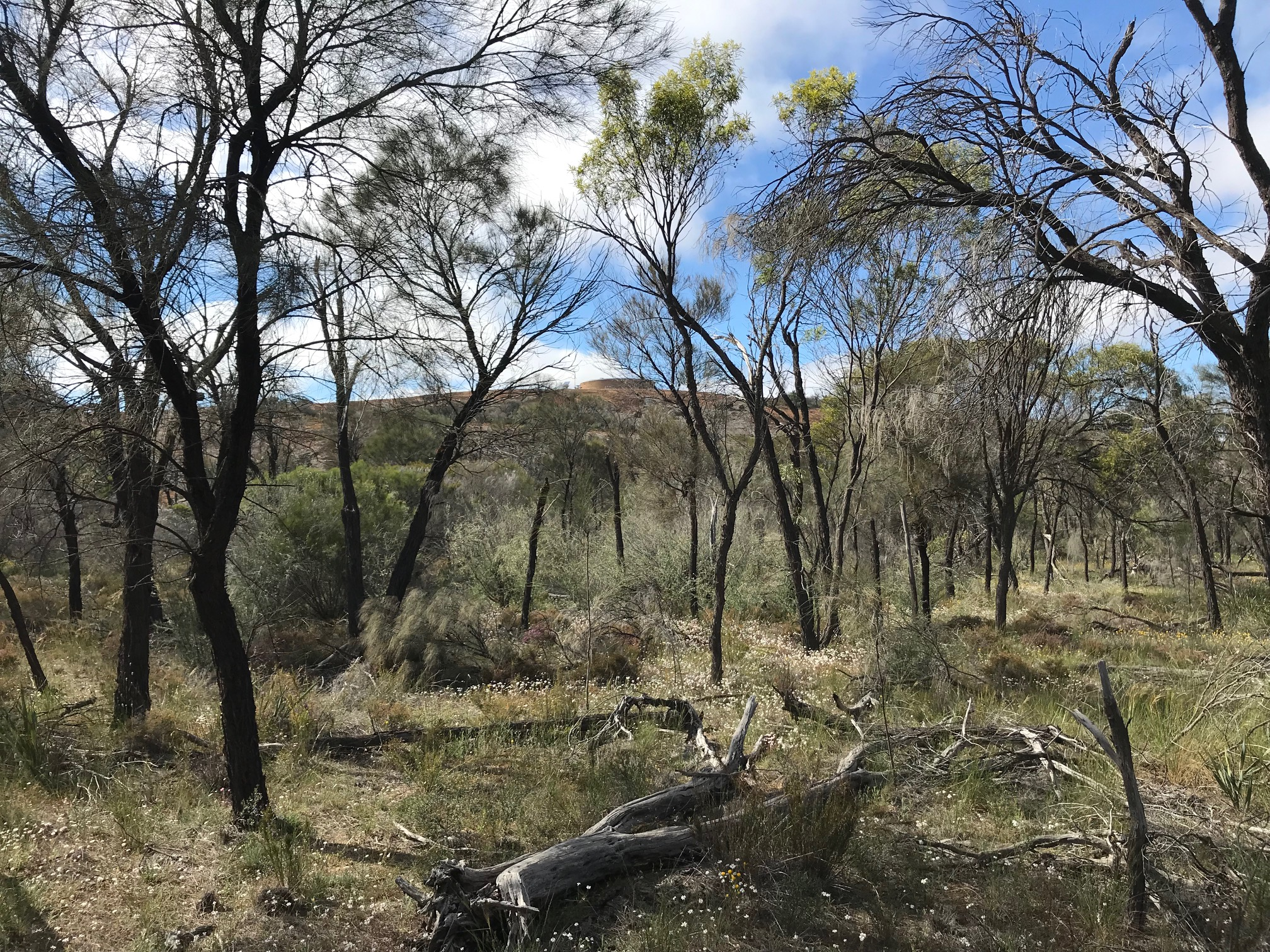
Yeerakine Rock from woodlands below

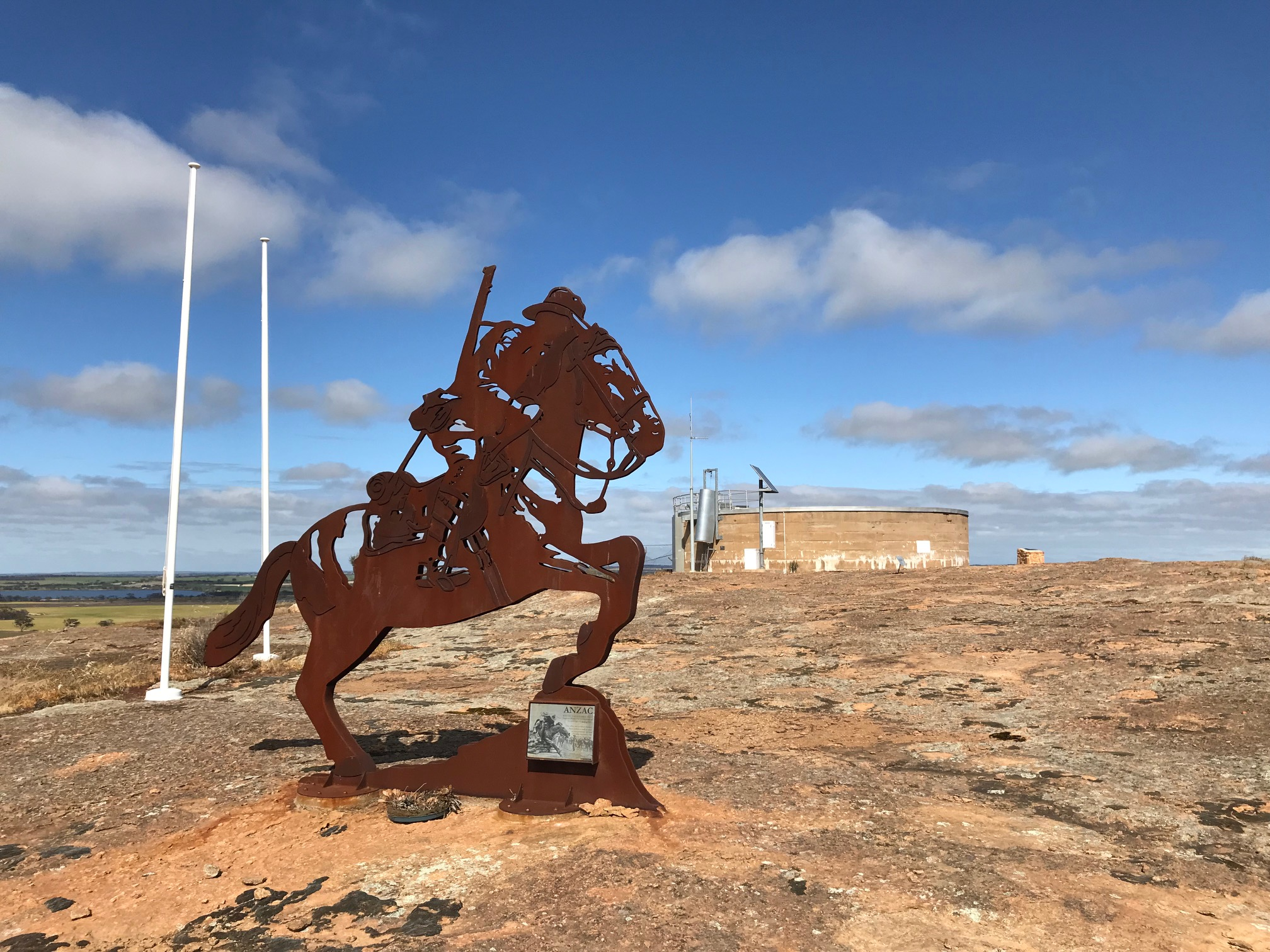
Water tank and sculpture atop Yeerakine Rock

Yeerakine Rock is a granite rock formation located approximately 12 km (7.5 mi) south of Kondinin and approximately 20 km (12 mi) north west of Kulin in the central Wheatbelt region of Western Australia.

The site has a parking area, picnic tables, barbeques and walk trails with information signage. The rock is easily climbed, giving good views over the surrounding plains. A more gentle path is to follow the road from the parking/picnic area, the 360 degree views are well worth the walk.

The first European to visit the rock was surveyor general John Septimus Roe, who camped there in 1848. He used the collected water at the site and planned the next part of his journey from the top of the rock outcrop. After the area was settled the rock was part of a pastoral lease held by Michael Brown of Jitarning.

A water catchment scheme was established on the rock in 1926 to provide water for Kondinin. The rock dam had a pump-house near the rock's summit that pumped water out of the dam and into another storage tank where it was gravity-fed to the townsite and some surrounding farms.

A Light Horse Memorial silhouette statue was placed on the rock to commemorate the Anzac centenary and is where Anzac Day services are held at dawn to honour those members of the Light Horse Brigade from the local area who didn’t return from the First World War. The memorial statue was designed by Brendan Kalnins.

Flora found around the site include donkey orchids, spider orchids, granite honey-myrtle, york gum, raspberry jam wattle, one-sided bottlebrush, black toothbrush grevillea, teatree.

== See also ==
- Granite outcrops of Western Australia
