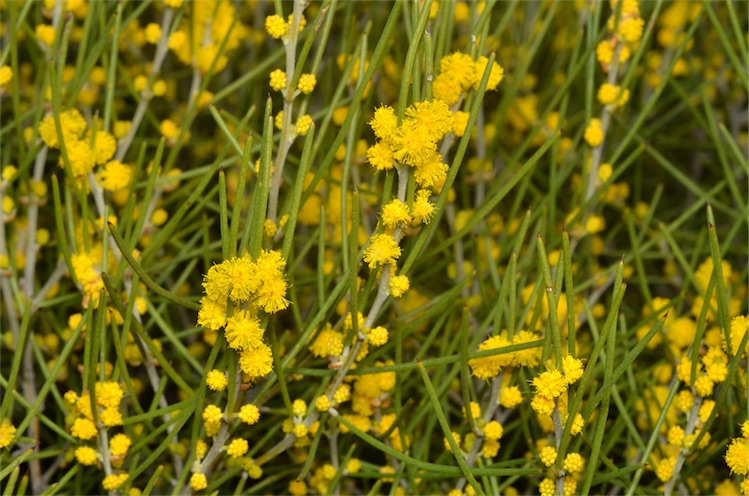

Scientific classification
- Kingdom: Plantae
- Clade: Tracheophytes
- Clade: Angiosperms
- Clade: Eudicots
- Clade: Rosids
- Order: Fabales
- Family: Fabaceae
- Subfamily: Caesalpinioideae
- Clade: Mimosoid clade
- Genus: Acacia
- Species: A. eremophila

Binomial name
- Acacia eremophila W.Fitzg.
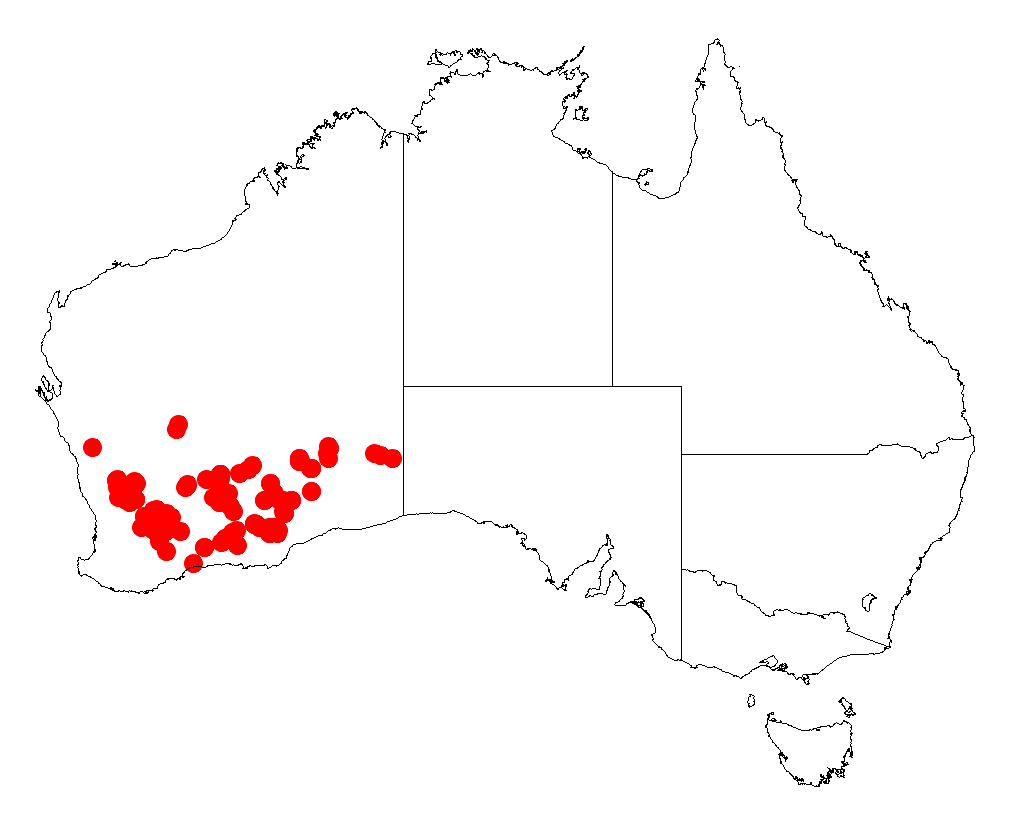
- Occurrence data from AVH

Synonyms
- Acacia leptoneura var. eremophila Ewart & Jean White; Racosperma eremophila (W.Fitzg.) Pedley; Acacia rigens auct. non A.Cunn. ex G.Don: Maslin, B.R. in Jessop, J.P. (ed.) (1981)

= Acacia eremophila =

Species of legume

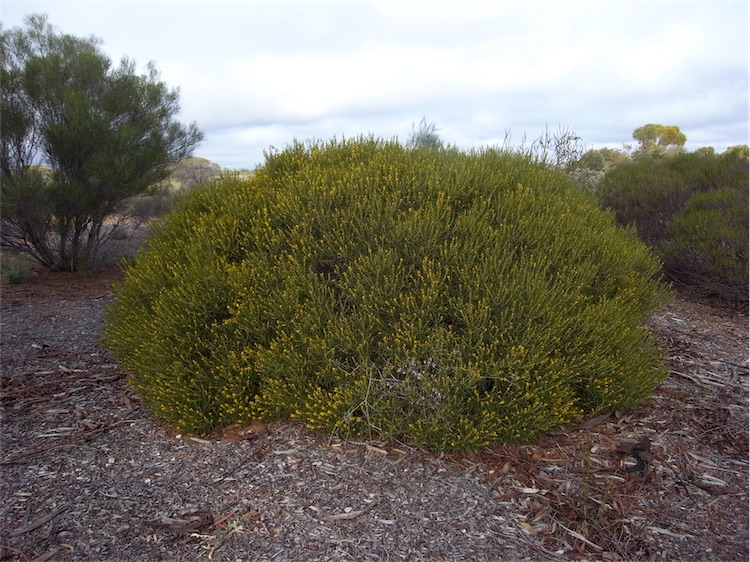
Habit in Arid Lands Botanic Garden, Port Augusta

Acacia eremophila is a species of flowering plant in the family Fabaceae and is endemic to the southern inland of Western Australia. It is a dense, rounded or inverted cone-shaped shrub with hairy branchlets, straight, terete, rigid phyllodes, spherical heads of light, golden yellow flowers, and linear, thinly crust-like pods raised over and more or less constricted between the seeds.

== Description ==
Acacia eremophila is a dense, rounded to inverted cone-shaped shrub that typically grows to a height of 0.4–2 m (1–7 ft) high and has hairy branchlets. Its phyllodes are straight, terete, 20–110 mm (0.79–4.33 in) long and 0.6–1.5 mm (0.024–0.059 in) in diameter with about 10 closely parallel veins. The flowers are borne in two spherical heads in axils on a peduncle 1–2 mm (0.039–0.079 in) long, each head 3–4 mm (0.12–0.16 in) in diameter with 10 to 25 light golden yellow flowers. Flowering occurs from July to October, and the pods are linear, thinly crust-like, 20–50 mm (0.79–1.97 in) long, 1.5–3 mm (0.059–0.118 in) wide, straight or wavy, and raised over and more or less constricted between the seeds. The seeds are elliptic to oblong, 2.5–3.0 mm (0.098–0.118 in) long and dark brown with an aril on the end.

== Taxonomy ==
Acacia eremophila was first formally described in 1912 by William Vincent Fitzgerald in the Journal of Botany, British and Foreign from specimens collected by Max Koch near Cowcowing. The specific epithet (eremophila) means 'lonely-' or 'solitary-loving'.

This species of wattle closely resembles Acacia densiflora.

In 1927, Joseph Maiden and William Blakely described two varieties of A. eremophila, in the Journal of the Royal Society of Western Australia, and the names are accepted by the Australian Plant Census:

- Acacia eremophila W.Fitzg. var. eremophila has phyllodes mostly 25–45 mm (0.98–1.77 in) long and straight pods that are glabrous or with red resin-hairs.
- Acacia eremophila var. variabilis Maiden & Blakely has phyllodes 50–110 mm (2.0–4.3 in) long, and wavy pods with soft hairs pressed against the surface.

== Distribution and habitat ==
Acacia eremophila grows in sandy soils with clay, loam and gravel on sandplains, sandy ridges and flats, and is widely distributed in the Avon Wheatbelt, Coolgardie, Esperance Plains, Great Victoria Desert, Mallee, Murchison and Nullarbor bioregions of Western Australia. The variety variabilis is known only from Kalannie, Comet Vale, Zanthus and Balladonia.

== Conservation status ==
Acacia eremophila var. eremophila is listed as "not threatened", but var. variabilis is listed as "Priority Three" by the Government of Western Australia Department of Biodiversity, Conservation and Attractions meaning that it is poorly known and known from only a few locations but is not under imminent threat.

== See also ==
- List of Acacia species
