= Synsphyronus elegans =

Scientific classification
- Kingdom: Animalia
- Phylum: Arthropoda
- Subphylum: Chelicerata
- Class: Arachnida
- Order: Pseudoscorpiones
- Family: Garypidae
- Genus: Synsphyronus
- Species: S. elegans

Binomial name
- Synsphyronus elegans Beier, 1954

Species of pseudoscorpion

Synsphyronus elegans is a species of pseudoscorpion in the Garypidae family. It is endemic to Australia. It was described in 1954 by Austrian arachnologist Max Beier.

== Distribution and habitat ==
The species occurs in south-west Western Australia. The type locality is Yorkrakine Rock in the eastern Wheatbelt region.

== Behaviour ==
The pseudoscorpions are terrestrial predators.
