= Drosera bulbigena =

Scientific classification
- Kingdom: Plantae
- Clade: Tracheophytes
- Clade: Angiosperms
- Clade: Eudicots
- Order: Caryophyllales
- Family: Droseraceae
- Genus: Drosera
- Subgenus: Drosera subg. Ergaleium
- Section: Drosera sect. Ergaleium
- Species: D. bulbigena

Binomial name
- Drosera bulbigena Morrison

Species of carnivorous plant

Drosera bulbigena, the midget sundew, is an erect perennial tuberous species in the genus Drosera that is endemic to Western Australia and occurs in an area near Perth and to its south along the coast. It grows to 3–6 cm (1–2 in) high and produces white flowers from August to October. D. bulbigena grows in swamps and winter-wet depressions.

Range of D. bulbigena in the wild.

D. bulbigena was first described and named by Alexander Morrison in 1903.

== See also ==
- List of Drosera species
