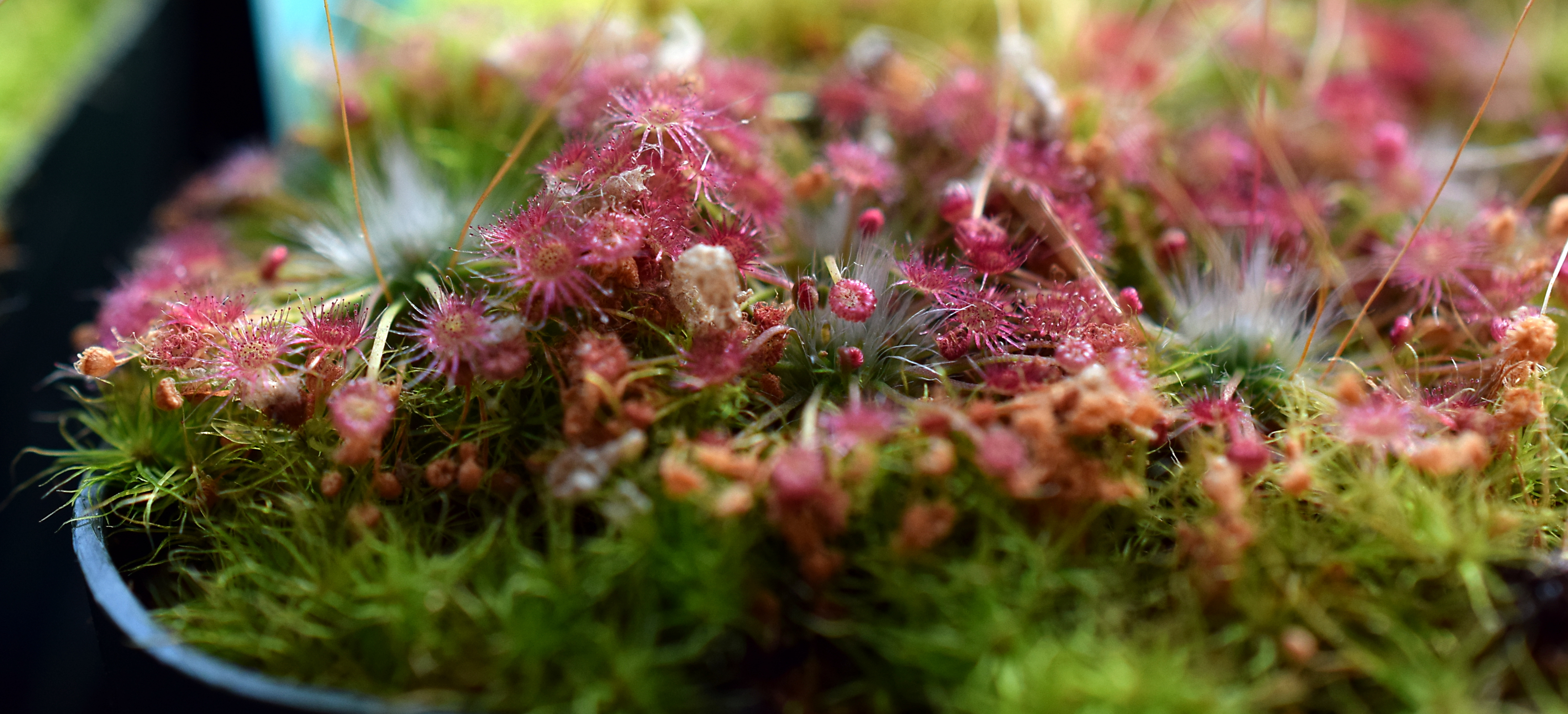
- Drosera Occidentalis (2014)

Scientific classification
- Kingdom: Plantae
- Clade: Embryophytes
- Clade: Tracheophytes
- Clade: Spermatophytes
- Clade: Angiosperms
- Clade: Eudicots
- Order: Caryophyllales
- Family: Droseraceae
- Genus: Drosera
- Species: D. occidentalis

Binomial name
- Drosera occidentalis Morrison

= Drosera occidentalis =

Species of carnivorous plant

Drosera occidentalis is a species in the carnivorous plant family Droseraceae, and native only to Western Australia. Its range is limited to wetlands from just north of Perth, south to just south of Busselton. It grows to 2.5 centimetres tall, and has leaf blades (laminae) which can be only 1 millimetre in diameter. The flowers are white or pink, produced from late spring to early summer.
