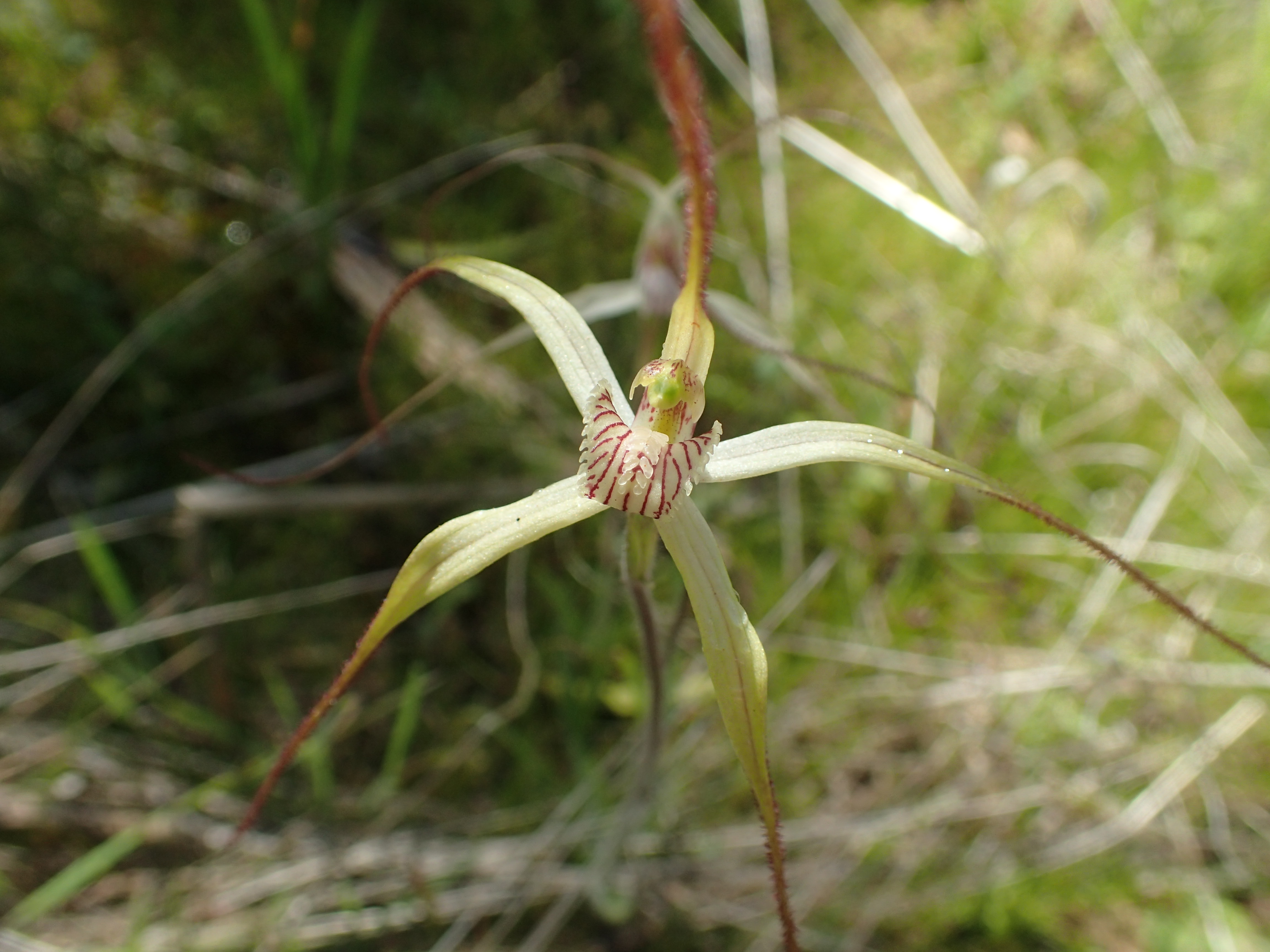
- Caladenia exilis subsp. exilis near Gunyidi

Scientific classification
- Kingdom: Plantae
- Clade: Tracheophytes
- Clade: Angiosperms
- Clade: Monocots
- Order: Asparagales
- Family: Orchidaceae
- Subfamily: Orchidoideae
- Tribe: Diurideae
- Genus: Caladenia
- Species: C. exilis Hopper & A.P.Br.
- Subspecies: C. e. subsp. exilis

Trinomial name
- Caladenia exilis subsp. exilis

Synonyms
- Calonemorchis exilis (Hopper & A.P.Br.) D.L.Jones & M.A.Clem.

= Caladenia exilis subsp. exilis =

Salt lake spider orchid

Subspecies of orchid

Caladenia exilis subsp. exilis, commonly known as the salt lake spider orchid, is a plant in the orchid family Orchidaceae and is endemic to the south-west of Western Australia. It is a relatively common spider orchid with a single erect, hairy leaf and up to three white to greenish-cream flowers with a small white, red-striped labellum.

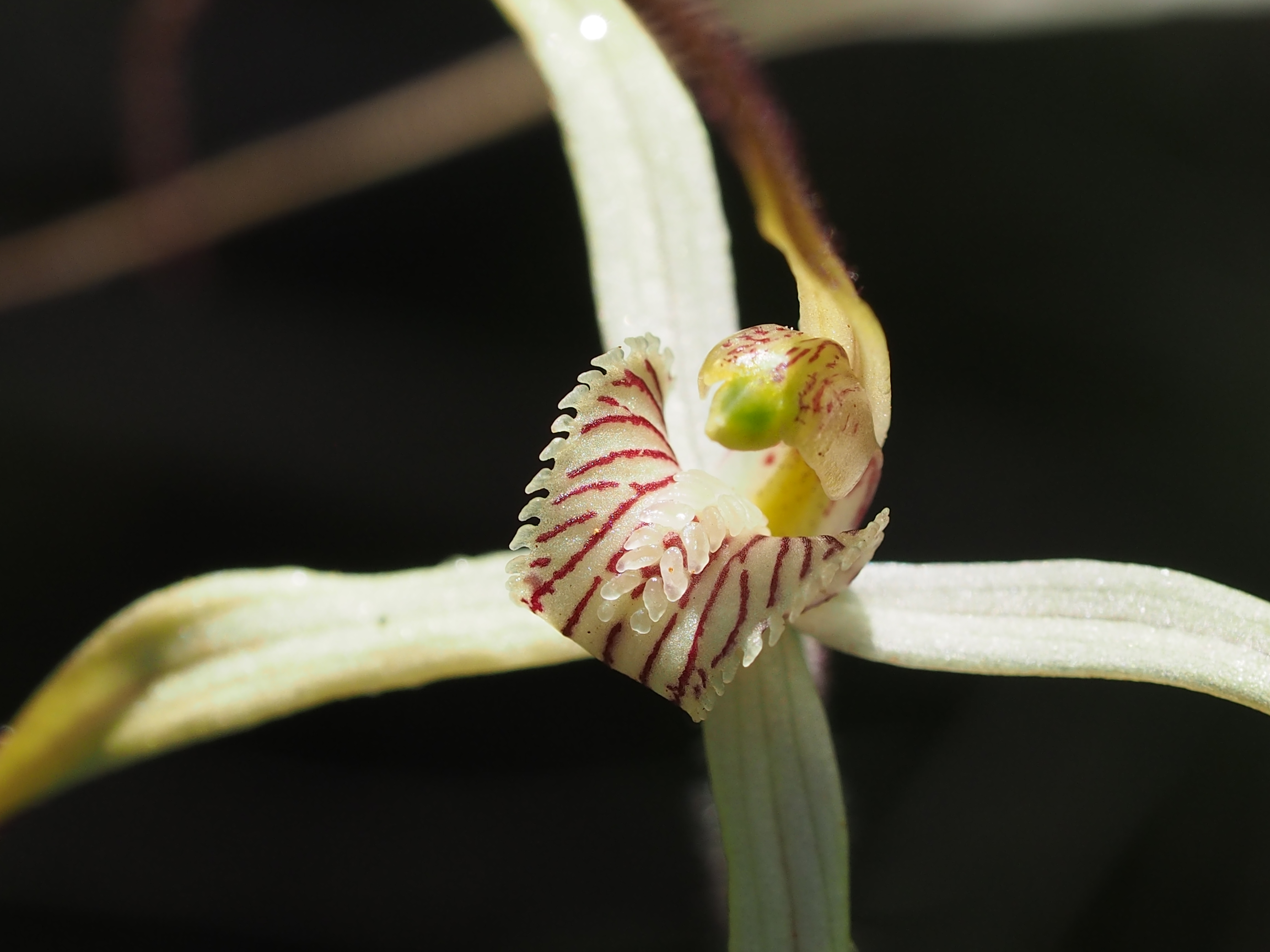
labellum detail

== Description ==
Caladenia exilis subsp. exilis is a terrestrial, perennial, deciduous, herb with an underground tuber which grows in tufts. It has a single erect, hairy leaf, 40–100 mm (2–4 in) long and 4–7 mm (0.2–0.3 in) wide. Up to three white to greenish-cream flowers 100–150 mm (4–6 in) long and 40–60 mm (1.6–2.4 in) wide are borne on a spike 150–250 mm (6–10 in) tall. The dorsal sepal is erect, 50–90 mm (2–4 in) long and about 2 mm (0.08 in) wide and tapers to a dark, thread-like tip. The lateral sepals and petals are more or less drooping with long, dark, thread-like tips. The lateral sepals are less than 50–90 mm (2–4 in) long, about 3 mm (0.1 in) wide at the base and the petals are 50–70 mm (2–3 in) long and about 2 mm (0.08 in) wide at the base. The labellum is 8–12 mm (0.3–0.5 in) long, 5–7 mm (0.2–0.3 in) wide and white or cream-coloured with red lines and spots. The edge of the labellum has short, forward-facing teeth and there are two rows of red to cream-coloured calli along its centre. Flowering occurs from July to September.

== Taxonomy and naming ==
Caladenia exilis subsp. exiliswas first formally described in 2001 by Stephen Hopper & Andrew Brown and the description was published in Nuytsia. The specific epithet (exilis) is a Latin word meaning "thin" or "slender" referring to the thin petals, sepals and labellum.

== Distribution and habitat ==
Salt lake spider orchid is relatively common between Woodanilling and Mullewa in the Avon Wheatbelt, Jarrah Forest and Mallee biogeographic regions where it grows near salt lakes in colonies of sometimes hundreds or thousands of plants.

== Conservation ==
Caladenia exilis subsp. exilis is classified as "not threatened" by the Western Australian Government Department of Parks and Wildlife.
