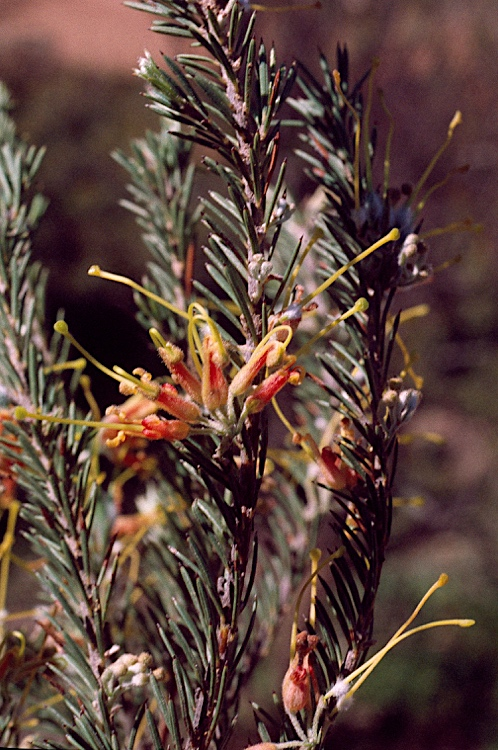

Scientific classification
- Kingdom: Plantae
- Clade: Tracheophytes
- Clade: Angiosperms
- Clade: Eudicots
- Order: Proteales
- Family: Proteaceae
- Genus: Grevillea
- Species: G. yorkrakinensis

Binomial name
- Grevillea yorkrakinensis C.A.Gardner

= Grevillea yorkrakinensis =

Species of shrub endemic to Western Australia

Grevillea yorkrakinensis is a species of flowering plant in the family Proteaceae and is endemic to the southwest of Western Australia. It is a small, compact, spreading shrub with linear leaves, and clusters of red to yellowish-orange flowers arranged in groups of up to five, the styles red to yellow or greenish.

== Description ==
Grevillea yorkrakensis is a dense, spreading shrub that typically grows to a height of 40 cm (16 in). Its leaves are linear, 3–18 mm (0.12–0.71 in) long, 0.6–1.2 mm (0.024–0.047 in) wide and often glaucous. The edges of the leaves are rolled under, concealing the lower surface, apart from the mid-vein, and the upper surface is glabrous. The flowers are arranged in erect clusters of 2 to 5 in leaf axils and on the stems on a rachis 0.5–3 mm (0.020–0.118 in) long. The flowers are red to yellowish-orange with a red to yellow or greenish style, the pistil 17–22 mm (0.67–0.87 in) long. Flowering occurs from May to October and the fruit is a narrowly oval to narrowly elliptic follicle 7.0–10.5 mm (0.28–0.41 in) long.

== Taxonomy ==
Grevillea yorkrakensis was first formally described by the botanist Charles Austin Gardner in 1923 in the Journal and Proceedings of the Royal Society of Western Australia from specimens he collected near Yorkrakine in 1922. The specific epithet (yorkrakensis) is a reference to the type location.

== Distribution and habitat ==
This grevillea grows in shrubland or mallee scrub between Mount Gibson and Wubin to Hyden in the south, and near Southern Cross, in the Avon Wheatbelt, Coolgardie, Mallee and Yalgoo bioregions of south-western Western Australia.

== Conservation status ==
Grevillea yorkrakensis is listed as "not threatened" by the Government of Western Australia Department of Biodiversity, Conservation and Attractions.

== See also ==
- List of Grevillea species
