= Yorkrakine =

- Town
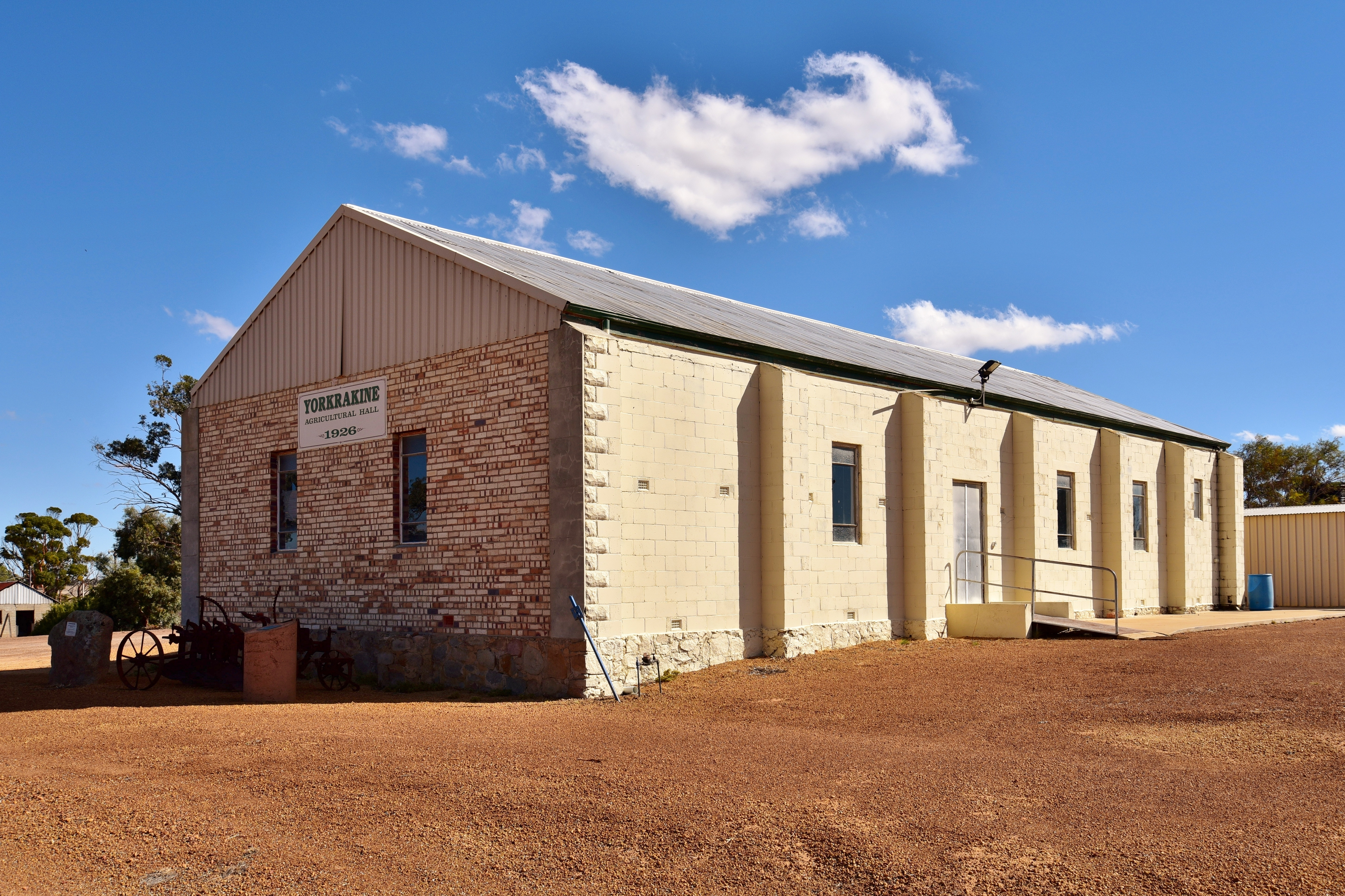
- Yorkrakine Agricultural Hall, 2018

- Interactive map of Yorkrakine
- Coordinates: 31°22′0″S 117°36′0″E
- Country: Australia
- State: Western Australia
- LGA: Shire of Tammin
- Location: 203 km (126 mi) E of Perth; 83 km (52 mi) W of Merredin; 23 km (14 mi) N of Tammin

Government
  - State electorate: Central Wheatbelt
  - Federal division: Durack

Population
  - Total: 138 (2021 census)

Yorkrakine is a small town in the Wheatbelt region of Western Australia; it is part of the Shire of Tammin, 203 kilometres (126 mi) east of the state capital, Perth. At the 2006 census, Yorkrakine had a population of 117. Since then, the area has been listed as North Tammin in the Australian census, with a population of 138.

The locality was once home to a school and general store but declining population and improved transport links have seen them both close. The Agricultural Hall (built in 1926) continues to host community functions.

Major landmarks include Yorkrakine Rock, a large granite rock located on Yorkrakine Rock Reserve on the Tammin–Wyalkatchem Road, which is a popular spot for picnics and bush walking. The rock is 341 m (1,119 ft) in height and occupies an area of 160 ha (400 acres). The base of the rock is good habitat for flora and fauna and is surrounded by York gum and jam woodlands.

The 1 ha (2.5-acre) Yorkrakine Rock Pools is one of the five sites in the Avon-Wheatbelt area recognised as a DIWA wetland.

The West Yorkrakine Cricket Club is the only remaining sport team from the area and plays in the Wyalkatchem Cricket Association.

The area was first settled in 1908 as part of a farm settlement scheme instigated by the Minister for Lands and Agriculture, James Mitchell.

The surrounding areas produce wheat and other cereal crops. The town is a receival site for Cooperative Bulk Handling.

A biological survey of the area was conducted in the 1970s
