= Albion Downs =

Pastoral lease in Western Australia

Coordinates: 27.29°S 120.393°E

Location in Western Australia

Albion Downs Station, often referred to as Albion Downs, is a pastoral lease that operates as a sheep station. It is located about 75 kilometres (47 mi) north west of Leinster and 80 kilometres (50 mi) south of Wiluna in the Mid West region of Western Australia.

== History ==
The property had been established before 1928 when it was owned by Mr. Howard. Sheep had been introduced to the property and increased in numbers as the country was being opened up. The quality of wool produced at the property was highly regarded, with top prices being paid for bales from Albion.

In 1976, the property was being run by Glenda and John Howard. It had suffered through a five-year drought and the flock had been reduced from 20,000 to 9,000 sheep. Dingos were also a problem and regularly had to be shot to protect the stock. The station occupied an area of 707,000 acres (286,113 ha) at this time.

== See also ==
- List of ranches and stations
