= Acacia densiflora =

Scientific classification
- Kingdom: Plantae
- Clade: Tracheophytes
- Clade: Angiosperms
- Clade: Eudicots
- Clade: Rosids
- Order: Fabales
- Family: Fabaceae
- Subfamily: Caesalpinioideae
- Clade: Mimosoid clade
- Genus: Acacia
- Species: A. densiflora

Binomial name
- Acacia densiflora Morrison
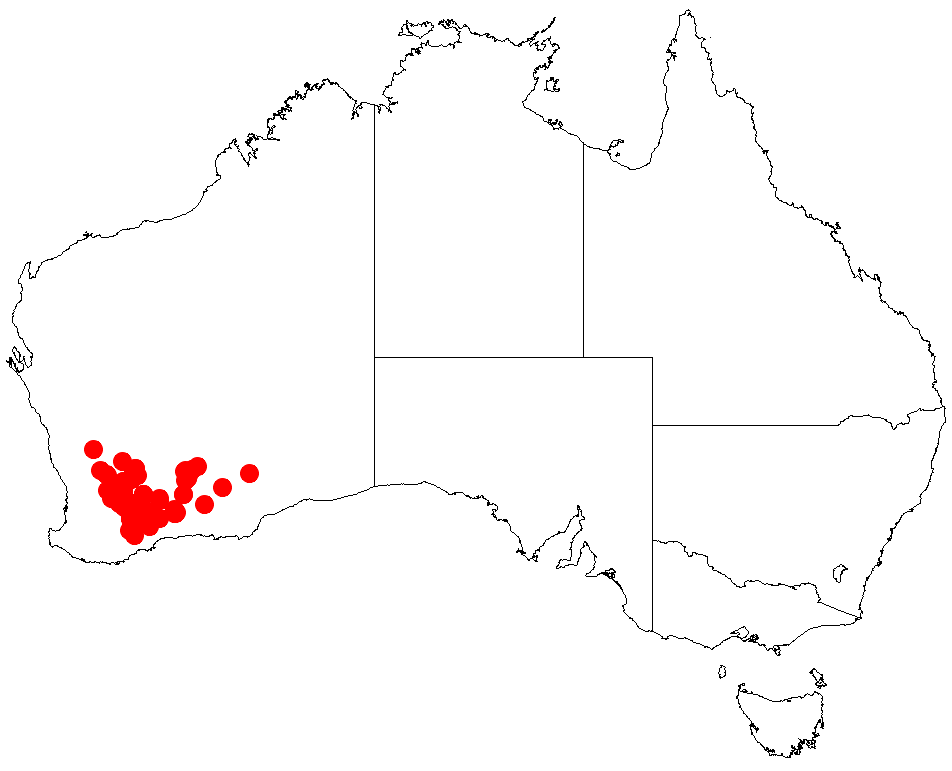
- Occurrence data from AVH

Synonyms
- Acacia densiflora Morrison isonym; Racosperma densiflorum (Morrison) Pedley

Species of legume

Habit near Lake King

Acacia densiflora is a species of flowering plant in the family Fabaceae and is endemic to the south-west of Western Australia. It is a rounded shrub with terete to compressed or flat and linear phyllodes with a sharp tip, spherical heads of golden yellow flowers and linear, slightly curved, hairy, thinly crust-like pods.

== Description ==
Acacia densiflora is a rounded shrub that typically grows to a height of 0.4–1.2 m (1–4 ft) and has branchlets covered with tiny matted woolly hairs. Its phyllodes are straight, terete to compressed or flat and linear, 20–50 mm (0.79–1.97 in) long and 1–2 mm (0.039–0.079 in) wide and coarsely to sharply pointed with about 16 parallel yellowish veins and one or two small glands. The flowers are borne in pairs of spherical heads in axils each head 4–5 mm (0.16–0.20 in) in diameter with mostly 15 to 18, rarely up to 25, golden yellow flowers. Flowering occurs from June to September, and the pods are linear, up to 45 mm (1.8 in) long, 2.5 mm (0.098 in) wide, raised over and slightly constricted between the seeds, thinly crust like, with hairs similar to those on the branchlets. The seeds are elliptic, about 3 mm (0.12 in) long and glossy, long black with an aril on the end.

== Taxonomy ==
Acacia densiflora was first formally described in 1912 by Alexander Morrison in the Scottish Botanical Review from specimens collected near Kellerberrin by Robert Buck Leak (1837–1924). The specific epithet (densiflora) means 'densely-flowered'.

== Distribution and habitat ==
This species of wattle mostly grows in sand and loam in mallee from near Wyalkatchem and Chiddarcooping (about 80 km (50 mi) north-north-east of Merredin) to Ongerup and Frank Hann National Park with an outlying population near Coolgardie, in the Avon Wheatbelt, Coolgardie and Mallee bioregions of south-western Western Australia.

== Conservation status ==
Acacia densiflora is listed as 'Not threatened' by the Government of Western Australia Department of Biodiversity, Conservation and Attractions.

== See also ==
- List of Acacia species
