= Alexander Morrison (botanist) =

Scottish botanist (1849–1913)

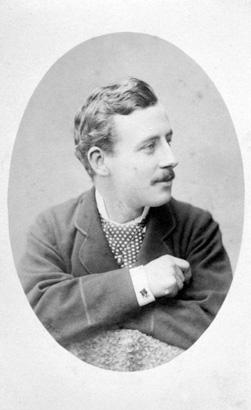
- Born: March 15, 1849; Dalmeny, West Lothian, Scotland
- Died: December 7, 1913 (aged 64); Cheltenham, Victoria
- Monuments: Alexander Morrison National Park
- Occupation(s): Botanist, Medical Doctor
- Employer(s): Bureau of Agriculture, Western Australia (1897 - 1906)
- Spouse: Never Married
- Children: None
- Parents: Thomas Morrison (1809-1867) (father); Ann Geggie (1815-1867) (mother)
- Relatives: Mark Coxon Morrison, Nephew

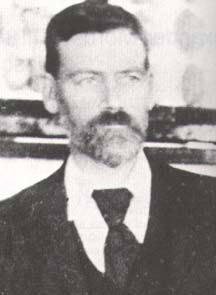
Alexander Morrison, in later life

Alexander Morrison (15 March 1849 – 7 December 1913) was a Scottish botanist and Western Australia's first Government Botanist in the Bureau of Agriculture. After emigrating to Australia in 1877, he proceeded to make a significant contribution to the study of the native flora, chiefly in Victoria and Western Australia.

Morrison was born in Wester Dalmeny, Edinburgh, Scotland, the 8th of 10 children to Thomas Morrison (1809–1867) and Ann Geggie (1815–1867). He began a medical degree at Edinburgh, but suffered from ill health, prompting him to break his studies and visit Australia. He spent two years in Melbourne before returning to Edinburgh to complete his degree. It was thought that he then undertook post-graduate studies at Glasgow, Würzburg and Vienna; however, there is no evidence he was ever at Glasgow, and the Medical Directory implies that he was educated at Edinburgh alone.

He returned to Australia in 1877 as medical officer on the SS Hastings, a migrant ship. He practiced medicine in Melbourne for 15 years, but again ill health prompted him to travel. He visited the South Seas and spend some time living in the New Hebrides, where he collected plants for Ferdinand von Mueller.

After returning to Australia, he was appointed the first Government Botanist of Western Australia, in the Bureau of Agriculture, holding the position from 1897 to 1906. He produced few papers during this time, but these were considered high quality work. Plant taxa published by him include Acacia densiflora, Acacia longispinea, Angianthus acrohyalinus (Hook-leaf Angianthus), Calandrinia creethae, Calandrinia schistorhiza, Drosera bulbigena (Midget Sundew), Drosera occidentalis (Western Sundew), and Indigofera boviperda. He also collected numerous specimens, including type specimens, of Eucalyptus ebbanoensis and Eucalyptus platycorys.

Morrison was retrenched from this position in 1906, thereupon returning to medical practice. In 1912 he was appointed assistant botanist to Alfred Ewart at the National Herbarium of Victoria (MEL). He died at Cheltenham, Victoria, the following year. He bequeathed his herbarium to Edinburgh University, his library to the University of Tasmania, and the remainder of his estate to the University of Melbourne.

In mid-2023, the National Herbarium of Victoria was contacted by the Herbarium Registrar of Edinburgh Herbarium (E) with an offer of a considerable number of Morrison's duplicate specimens. The donation was gratefully accepted, and in April 2024, the National Herbarium of Victoria acquired approximately 650 Morrison specimens, collected in Victoria between 1871 and 1897. Along with the National Herbarium of Victoria, specimens collected by Morrison are also held by the Plantentuin Meise in Belgium, and the University of Oslo herbarium.

Alexander Morrison National Park, north of Perth in Western Australia, is named in his honour.

== Bibliography ==
- Short, P.S. (1990). History of Systematic Botany in Australasia. South Yarra, Victoria: Australian Systematic Botany Society.
