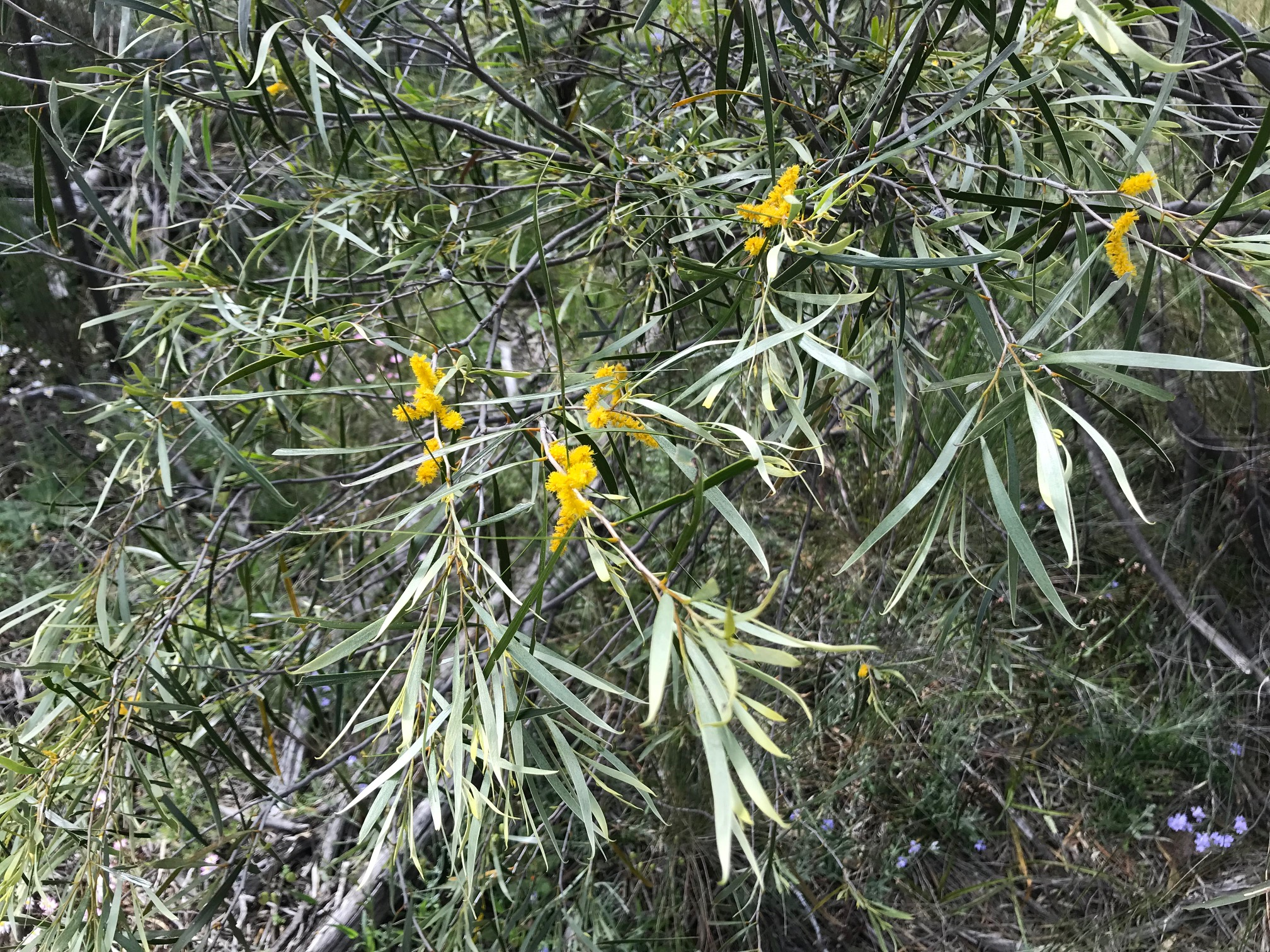
- Near Yeerakine Rock

Conservation status
- Least Concern (IUCN 3.1)

Scientific classification
- Kingdom: Plantae
- Clade: Embryophytes
- Clade: Tracheophytes
- Clade: Spermatophytes
- Clade: Angiosperms
- Clade: Eudicots
- Clade: Rosids
- Order: Fabales
- Family: Fabaceae
- Subfamily: Caesalpinioideae
- Clade: Mimosoid clade
- Genus: Acacia
- Species: A. acuminata

Binomial name
- Acacia acuminata Benth.
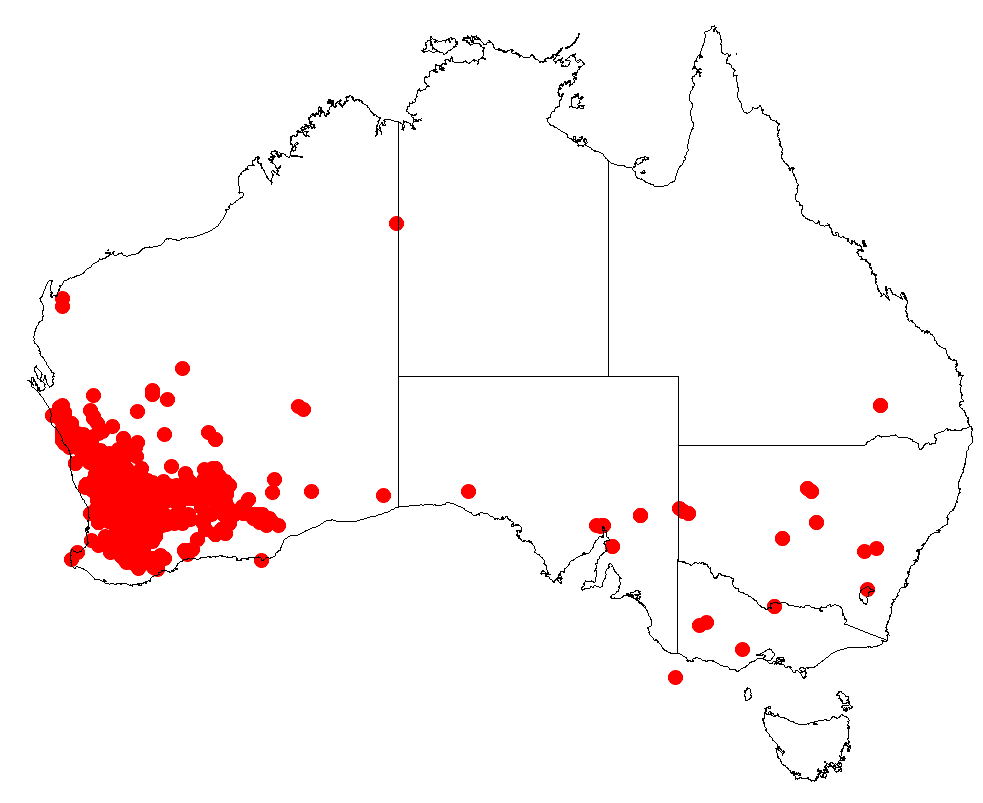
- Occurrence data from AVH

Synonyms
- Acacia acuminata (narrow phyllode variant) Maslin; Acacia acuminata Benth. subsp. acuminata; Acacia acuminata Benth. var. acuminata; Acacia acuminata var. ciliata Meisn.; Acacia sp. Narrow phyllode (B.R.Maslin 7831) WA Herbarium; Racosperma acuminatum (Benth.) Pedley

= Acacia acuminata =

Raspberry jam

Species of plant

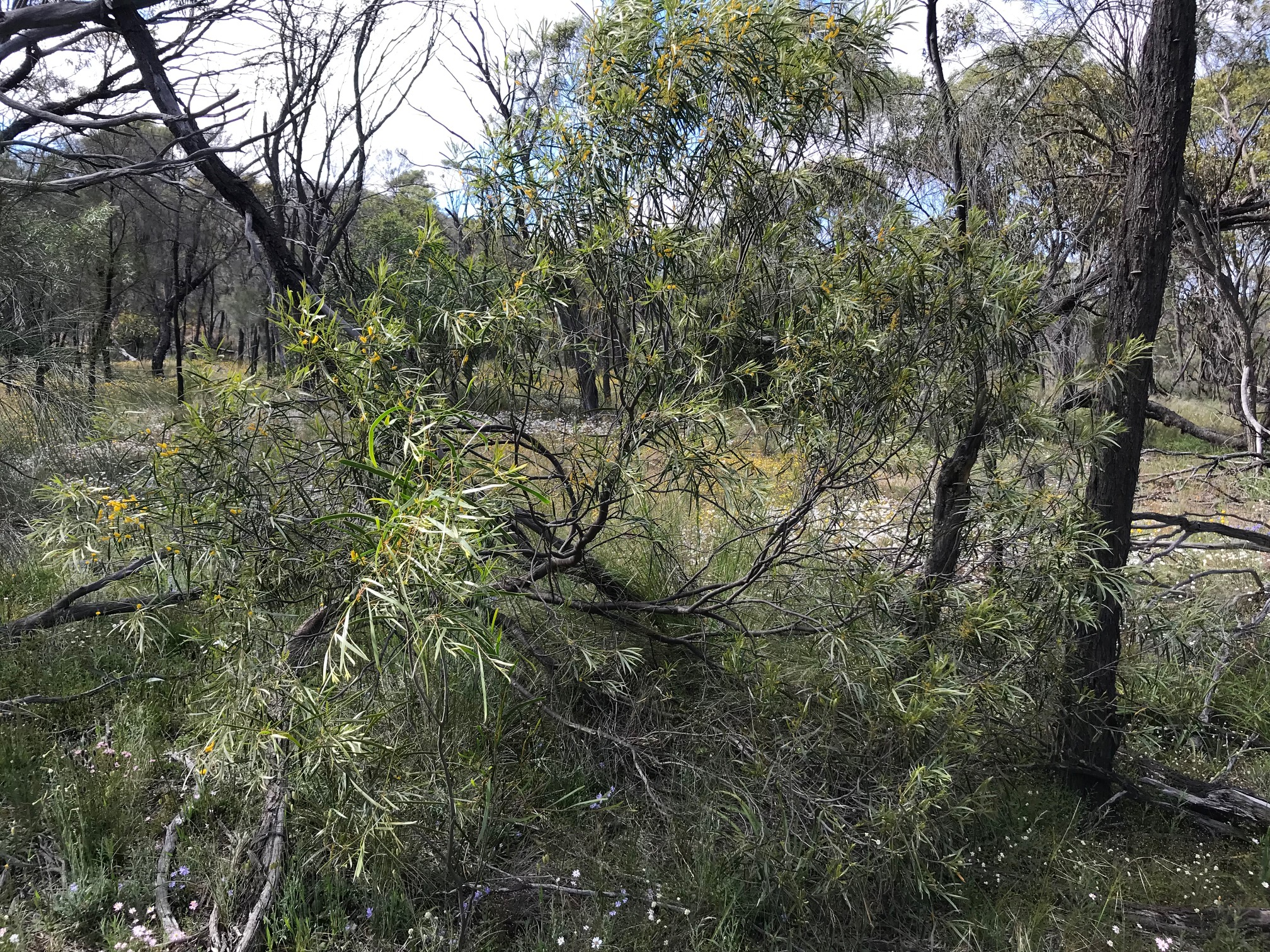
Habit

Acacia acuminata, commonly known as raspberry jam, jam, jam wattle, jamwood, jam tree, or raspberry wattle, is a species of flowering plant in the family Fabaceae and is endemic to the south-west of Western Australia. It is a tree with linear to narrowly elliptic phyllodes, spikes of golden-yellow flowers and papery to leathery pods.

== Description ==
Acacia acuminata grows as a tall shrub or small tree mostly 3–7 m (9.8–23.0 ft) tall and conical with the narrower end towards the base. Its new shoots are yellow and silky hairy. Its phyllodes are ascending to erect, linear to narrowly elliptic mostly 80–250 mm (3.1–9.8 in) long and 2–8 mm (0.079–0.315 in) wide. The phyllodes are bright green and more or less glabrous. The flowers are golden-yellow and borne in one or two sessile spikes mostly 10–30 mm (0.39–1.18 in) long. Flowering occurs from July to October, and the fruit is a linear, papery to leathery pod mostly 30–80 mm (1.2–3.1 in) long. The seeds are dark brown to black, oblong or elliptic to egg-shaped, 2.0–4.5 mm (0.079–0.177 in) long and 1.5–3 mm (0.059–0.118 in) wide with a white or creamy-white aril.

== Taxonomy and naming ==
Acacia acuminata was first formally described in 1842 by George Bentham in Hooker's London Journal of Botany from specimens collected near the Swan River Colony by James Drummond and at King Georges Sound by William Baxter. The specific epithet (acuminatus) means "pointed" and refers to the phyllodes.

Three variants of A. acuminata were proposed in a 2002 paper, but the names are not accepted by the Australian Plant Census.

The Noongar peoples know the tree as manjart, munertor, mungaitch or mungat.

== Distribution and habitat ==
Acacia acuminata grows in a variety of soils and habitats in the south-west of Western Australia from just north of the Murchison River, south to Borden and east to Balladonia, with outliers near Yalgoo and Paynes Find in the Avon Wheatbelt, Coolgardie, Esperance Plains, Geraldton Sandplains, Great Victoria Desert, Jarrah Forest, Mallee, Murchison, Nullarbor, Swan Coastal Plain and Yalgoo bioregions of south-western Western Australia.

The explorer Henry Lefroy found the species was very common between Narembeen and the Avon River and growing with sandalwood (Santalum acuminatum) in 1863, the conservator of forests, John Ednie Brown, estimated in 1895 that an area of four million acres was dominated by this species growing with Eucalyptus loxophleba (York gum), the valuable sandalwood having already been cleared. Drummond noticed the species growing outside its range at Guildford, attributing this occurrence to spilled seed that had been transported to the site in food bags. The first thorough survey of the distribution was documented by Surveyor General Malcolm Fraser in 1882, who recorded a range from Champion Bay to the south at Gordon River; he also notes the consumption of its seed and regrowth by introduced stock animals.

== Ecology ==
The seeds are consumed by regent parrots (Polytelis anthopeplus). The species is a host to mistletoe species of genus Amyema, the host-parasite relationship having been researched near Geraldton with Amyema fitzgeraldii and elsewhere with Amyema preissii.

== Constituents ==
Acacia acuminata is known to contain psychedelic tryptamines like dimethyltryptamine (DMT).

== Uses ==
=== In horticulture ===
Acacia acuminata has high frost tolerance and medium salt tolerance. Acacia acuminata is tolerant of drought and frosts and is moderately salt tolerant. It requires at least 250mm/year (9.8in./year) average rainfall. Grows on seasonally dry duplex soils. Coppicing ability is absent or very low and it may be killed by fire. The wood has a distinct scent of raspberry jam and is very durable in the ground and favored for round fencing material; it has an attractive grain and is used for craft wood. A. acuminata comprises a number of informal variants (see above) and is the main host being used in Sandalwood (Santalum spicatum) plantations.

=== Food ===
The nutritional composition of the numerous seeds, a shiny brown-black colour, is 45% protein, 28% fats and 15% carbohydrates.

=== Timber ===
The wood is hard and durable, attractive, reddish, and closely grained. It has been used extensively for fence posts, for ornamental articles, and for high-load applications such as sheave blocks. The wood's "air dried" density is 1040 kg/m^{3}. The tensile strength is around eighty megapascal, the transverse strength is over one hundred MPa. It is also being used as a companion/host tree with sandalwood (Santalum spicatum) plantations in the Wheatbelt region. The extensive use of the plant for wood, food and medicine by Nyungar peoples saw it regarded as a valuable resource. The abundance of seed was made into flour. The sap was collected and administered as medicine, either immediately or prepared and stored for later use. The wood was preferred in the manufacture of kylies, a boomerang-type weapon.

The timber's resistance to termites was exploited for fence-posts when European agriculture was expanded into nearby areas, the durability of these is evident in fencing over 100 years old. The conservator of state forests, Charles Lane-Poole, noted the longevity of fence posts in the 1920s, and that colonial farmers also regarded the species and an indicator of suitable land for raising wheat and sheep. Poole remarks on resemblance of the decorative grain to its sister species, Acacia melanoxylon (blackwood). The number of posts produced in the period 1954–1968 was 2.7 million. Timber cutters were required to pay a royalty and obtain a license. The colonial diarist, George Fletcher Moore, noted the fine qualities of the timber and thought it suitable for cabinetry. The uses of the wood came to include pipes and walking sticks, and the construction of staircases and furniture. The tree is regarded as a good source of firewood, the value as charcoal was recorded by Ferdinand von Mueller in 1877. The charcoal was used for powering gas producing mechanisms attached to motor vehicles during petrol rationing in the mid-twentieth century.

== See also ==
- List of Acacia species
