= Nightcap =

Nightcap often refers to:

- Nightcap (garment), a soft cloth cap worn in bed
- Nightcap (drink), a drink (often alcoholic) consumed before going to bed

Nightcap may also refer to:

== Places ==
- Nightcap National Park, New South Wales, Australia
- Nightcap Range Important Bird Area, New South Wales, Australia
- Nightcaps, New Zealand, a small town on the South Island of New Zealand

== Film, radio, TV, and podcasts ==
- The NightCap, Australian late-night TV show airing online and on Channel 7 HD from February 2008
- Nightcap (1953 TV series), a 1953–1954 Canadian music variety television series
- Nightcap (1963 TV series), a 1963–1967 Canadian comedy and variety television series
- Herb Jepko Nitecap Show, late night radio call-in show aired from 1964 to 1978
- Nightcap (2016 TV series), a 2016–2017 American comedy television series
- Nightcap (podcast), an American podcast hosted by Shannon Sharpe, Chad Johnson, and Gilbert Arenas

== Fictional characters ==
- Nightcap, a character appearing in the Plants vs. Zombies franchise

== Music ==
- Nightcaps (Seattle band), American lounge music band active 1994–present
- The Nightcaps (Texas band), 1958-2009
- Nightcap: The Unreleased Masters 1973–1991, a 1993 double-disk album by Jethro Tull

== Sport ==
- Nightcap (baseball), night game of a baseball doubleheader
