= Koonyum Range =

Australian mountain range

- Location within New South Wales

Highest point
- Elevation: 409 m (1,342 ft); AHD

Geography
- Country: Australia
- State: New South Wales
- Range coordinates: 28°32′54″S 153°24′04″E

The Koonyum Range is a mountain range in the Australian state of New South Wales.

The traditional owners of the range are the Arakwal people of the Bundjalung Nation.

Part of the range fall within the Mount Jerusalem National Park including Boogarem Falls.

The name Koonyum is probably derived from the Gidabal term "gunyin" for anus or "coonyum" for the buttocks.
