= Goonengerry National Park =

National park in New South Wales, Australia

- IUCN category II (national park)
- Location within New South Wales
- Location: New South Wales
- Coordinates: 28°34′47″S 153°24′17″E
- Area: 4 km^{2} (1.5 sq mi)
- Established: 1999
- Governing body: NSW National Parks & Wildlife Service
- Website: Official website

Goonengerry National Park is a national park in New South Wales, Australia, 626 kilometres (389 mi) northeast of Sydney. It is adjacent to the suburb of Goonengerry and is situated within the Byron Shire and sits approximately 17 kilometres (11 mi) south west of Mullumbimby.

The park is located on the traditional lands of the Widjabul Wia-bal People of the Bundjalung Nation who are its traditional owners.

== Important Bird Area ==
The park lies within the Nightcap Range Important Bird Area, so identified by BirdLife International because it contains the largest known population of Albert's lyrebirds, as well as several other significant bird species.

== History ==
What is now the national park was first settled by European timber getters in the 1880s and, by the 1940s, it was freehold land owned by Banana Growers Federation. During this period it was known as Tom Rummery Forest after a forestry inspector of the same name.

The banana growers used it to log for timber for banana boxes and, to do so, they planted numerous parts of the forest with blackbutt (Eucalyptus pilularis) and flooded gum (Eucalyptus grandis). By the 1980s carboard was primarily used to package bananas and this use of the forest declined.

Before the proclamation of the national park, this area was a state forest and was purchased by the NSW Forestry Commission in 1986 which led to a period of heavy logging by contractors. By 1991 a campaign was started to save the forest which was led by locals including Val Hodgson. As a part of their campaign Hodgson interviewed man residents and collected their stories of the forest and its use over time; one thing these interviews found was the shock of so many that so much timber was being taken from such a small area.

Another group involved in the campaign was the Friends of Goonengerry Sanctuary (FROGS) and their major focus was on the risks of logging on the Albert's lyrebird which live there.

Based on this advocacy it was purchased and became a national park in January 1999 based on its significant environmental values.

== See also ==
- Protected areas of New South Wales
