= Mount Burrell =

Town in New South Wales, Australia

- Town
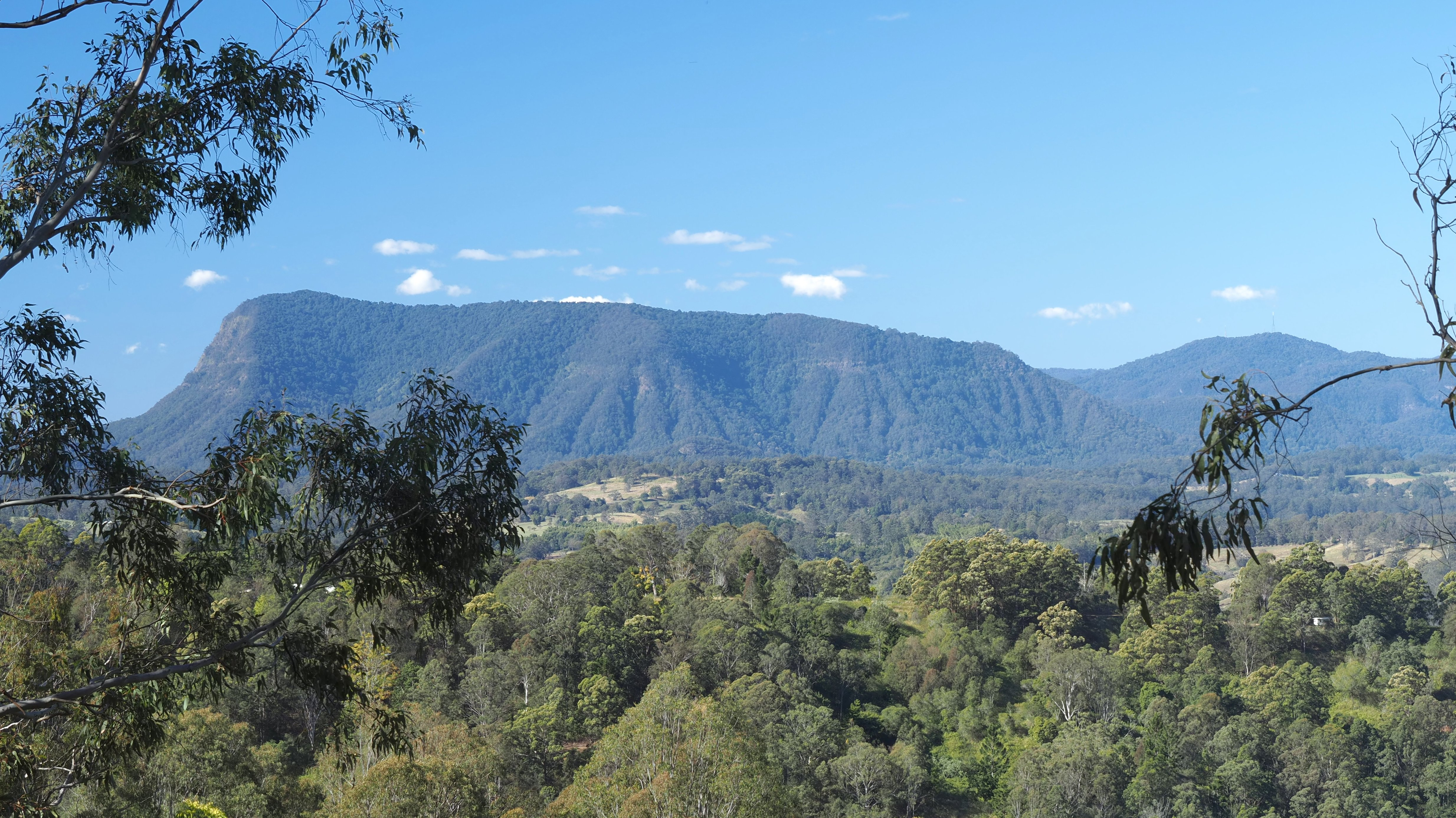
- Distant view of Mount Burrell, from the west
- Coordinates: 28°30′S 153°13′E
- Country: Australia
- State: New South Wales
- Region: Northern Rivers
- LGA: Tweed Shire

Government
  - State electorate: Tweed
  - Federal division: Richmond

Population
  - Total: 484 (2011 census)
- Time zone: UTC+10 (AEST)
  - Summer (DST): UTC+11 (AEDT)
- Postcode: 2484

Burrell
- Blue Knob
- Location within New South Wales

Highest point
- Elevation: 933 m (3,061 ft)
- Coordinates: 28°31′S 153°13′E

Geography
- Location: Northern Rivers region of New South Wales, Australia
- Parent range: Nightcap Range

Mount Burrell is a town and a mountain in the Nightcap Range in the Tweed Shire in the Northern Rivers region of New South Wales, Australia.

The peak of Mount Burrell has an elevation of 933 metres (3,061 ft) above sea level, approximately 8 kilometres (5.0 mi) north of Nimbin.

The Ngandowal and Minyungbal speaking people of the Bundjalung people are the traditional owners of the Tweed region, including Mount Burrell, and the surrounding areas.

== Demographics ==
In 2011, the population of Mount Burrell was 484, with 49.8% female and 50.2% male. The median age of the Mount Burrell population was 47 years of age, 10 years above the Australian median. 77.9% of people living in Mount Burrell were born in Australia. The other top responses for country of birth were England 5%, New Zealand 2.9%, Germany 1.2%, Switzerland 1%, Fiji 0.8%, and 10.9% other countries. 91.9% of people spoke only English at home; the next most common languages were 1.7% German, 1% Dutch, 1% African Languages, 3.7% other languages.

== See also ==
- List of mountains in Australia § New South Wales
- Nightcap National Park
