= Nightcap Range =

Mountain range in New South Wales, Australia

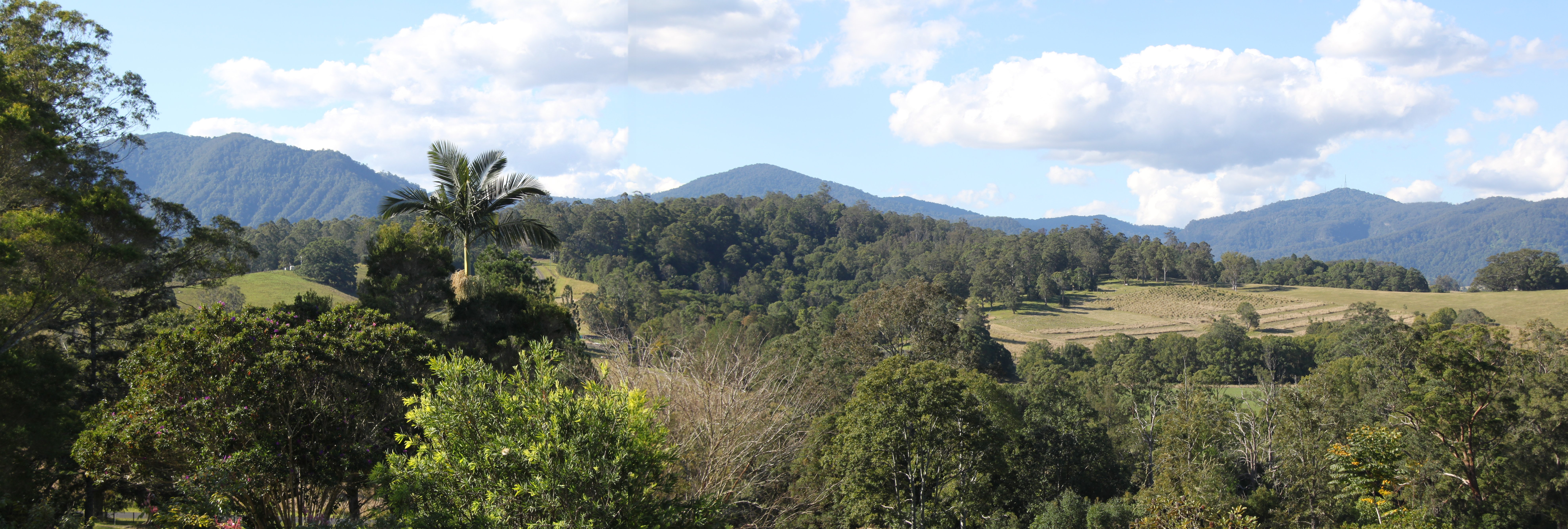
- Southern elevation of The Nightcap Range in northern New South Wales; left: Mount Burrell (part); centre: Mount Neville; right: Mount Nardi

Highest point
- Peak: Mount Burrell
- Elevation: 933 m (3,061 ft); AHD
- Coordinates: 28°31′S 153°13′E

Dimensions
- Length: 25 km (16 mi) SE

Geography
- Location within New South Wales
- Country: Australia
- State: New South Wales
- Range coordinates: 28°33′S 153°20′E
- Parent range: Great Dividing Range

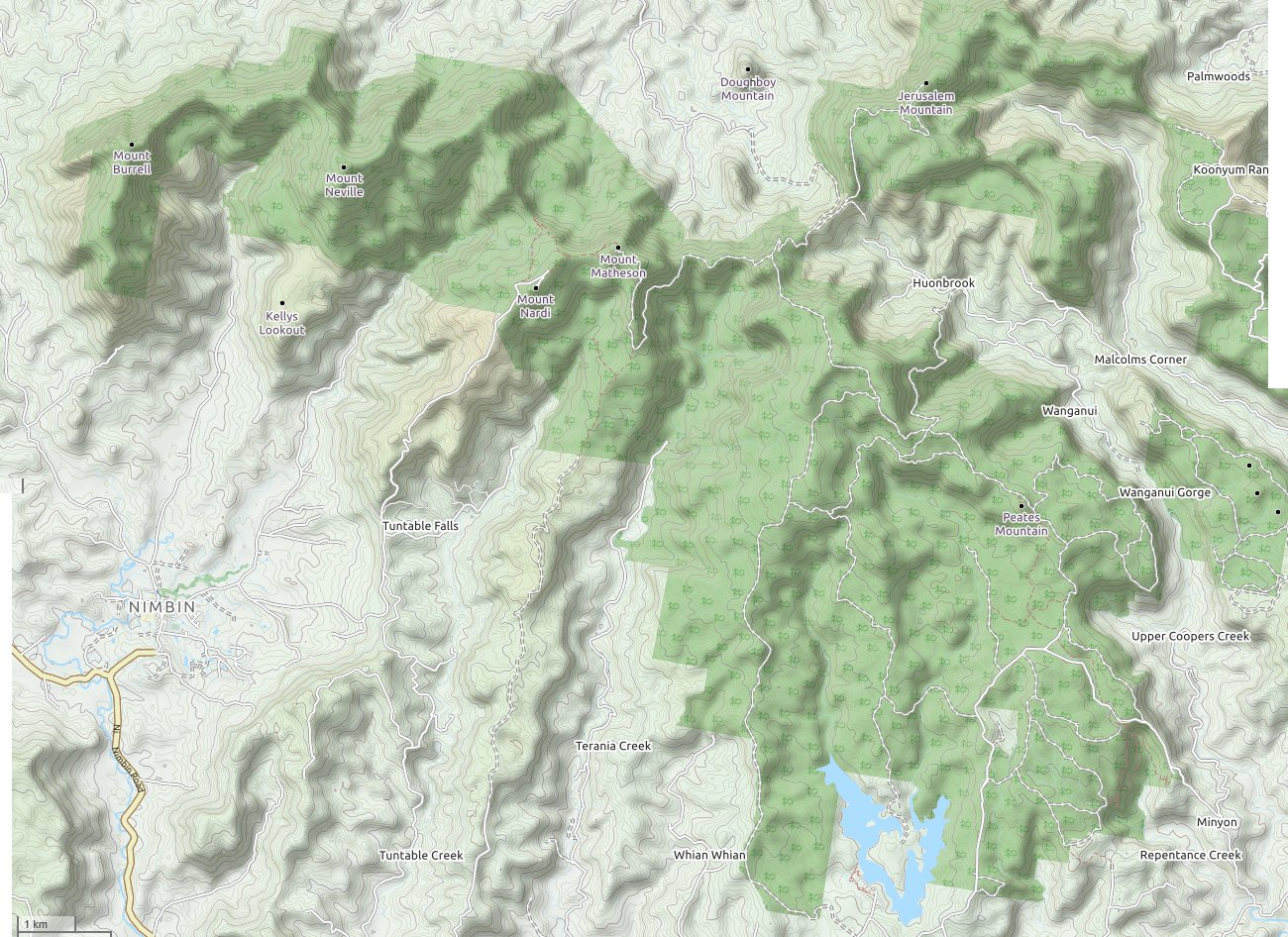
The Nightcap Range - map from OpenStreetMap. Area highlighted in green is the Nightcap National Park, also including the Whian Whian State Conservation Area.

The Nightcap Range is a mountain range in the Northern Rivers region of New South Wales, Australia, in the area between Lismore and the New South Wales-Queensland border. It includes Mount Burrell and Mount Nardi as well as containing the Nightcap National Park. The range is mainly covered with relict warm temperate rainforest and contains several rare and/or endemic species, most notably the Nightcap oak and the Minyon quandong.

== Description ==
The range is a spur off the Great Dividing Range and extends generally southeast from Mount Burrell for about 25 kilometres (16 mi) to Peates Mountain. It is separated from the remainder of the Great Dividing Range by the Nimbin Gap. The Range forms the southern flank of the Mount Warning (Tweed) shield volcano and geologically, is formed from the Lismore Basalts which are then overlain successively by the Nimbin Rhyolites and finally the Blue Knob Basalts.

The highest peak in the range is Mount Burrell at 933 metres (3,061 ft) above sea level. Other major peaks are Mount Neville at 919 metres (3,015 ft), Mount Nardi at 812 metres (2,664 ft), Mount Matheson at 804 metres (2,638 ft), and Peates Mountain at 604 metres (1,982 ft). The name "Blue Knob" is applied to a prominence on the top of Mount Burrell (with "Sphinx Rock" another geological feature adjacent to the main elevated section); the names "Blue Knob" and "Mount Burrell" are also used for the names of settled areas (districts) at the base of the range.

== Man made features ==
The summit of Mount Nardi is the site for several transmission towers which are used for FM radio, digital television and formerly, analogue TV and fixed wireless broadband internet transmissions, as well as some mobile phone services. The summit can be reached by a bitumen road via Nimbin which cost £32,000 to construct in tandem with the first tower in 1962 (the tower itself costing only £10,000) and is the starting point for several walking tracks including the Historic Nightcap walking track, which once was the principal route taken by travellers and postal workers between Lismore and Murwillumbah.

The range contains the Nightcap National Park and forms part of the catchment for Rocky Creek Dam which is located to the north of Lismore, and provides the drinking water supply for a large portion of the Northern Rivers area.

== Notable flora ==
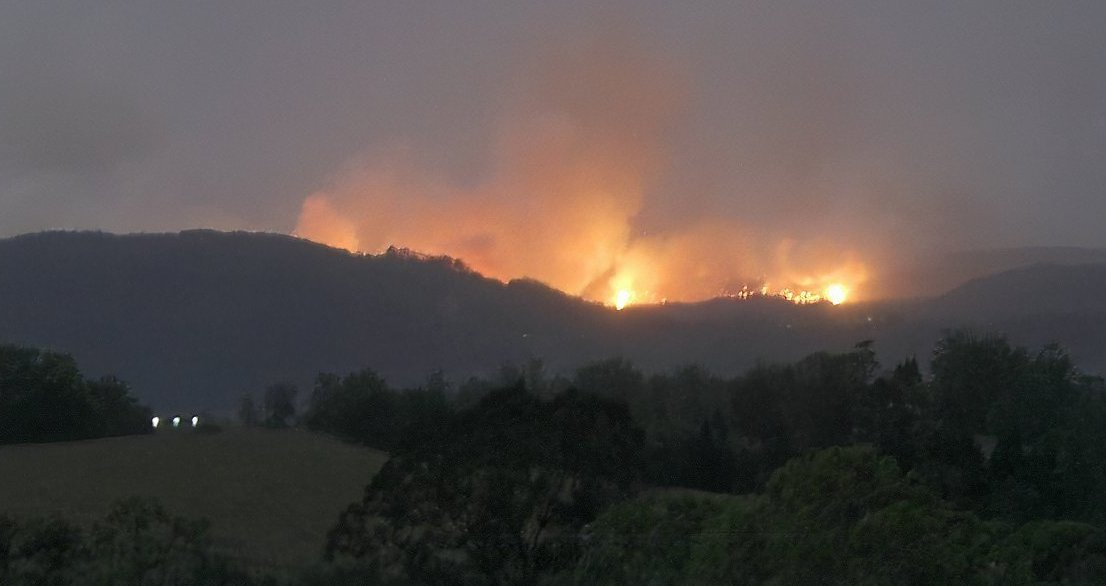
Bushfire in the Nightcap Range, 8 November 2019

The range is the only known locality for the Nightcap oak, Eidothea hardeniana, a member of the Proteaceae, with a known population only around 100 wild plants, recognised and named in 2002. Much of its habitat was devastated by a bushfire on the range (the Mount Nardi bushfire) in November 2019. The range is also notable for containing the majority of known sites for the extremely restricted Minyon quandong, a medium sized tree in the Elaeocarpaceae, which had been recognised as a distinct species for some time but formally described only in 2008.

== Derivation of locality names ==
According to the Richmond-Tweed Regional Library's "Place Names of the Tweed, Brunswick and Upper Richmond Regions", the name "Nightcap" is a corruption of "night camp", as used by the original surveyors of the range and subsequent travellers; beyond Nimbin, further along the old Murwillumbah to Lismore route through the mountains, the small settlement of Coffee Camp retains its original, similarly derived name unaltered. Mount Matheson is named for the Government Surveyor George Matheson who, with his assistant Arthur Gracie, surveyed the track over the Nightcap Range in the early 1870s. Mount Burrell (stated as originally spelled with a single "l") is possibly from the Aboriginal word "burrul", meaning "wallaby", while Mount Nardi (previously considered a portion of Mount Matheson) is named for Terania Shire Councillor Angelo Nardi who served from 1956 to 1961.

== Gallery ==
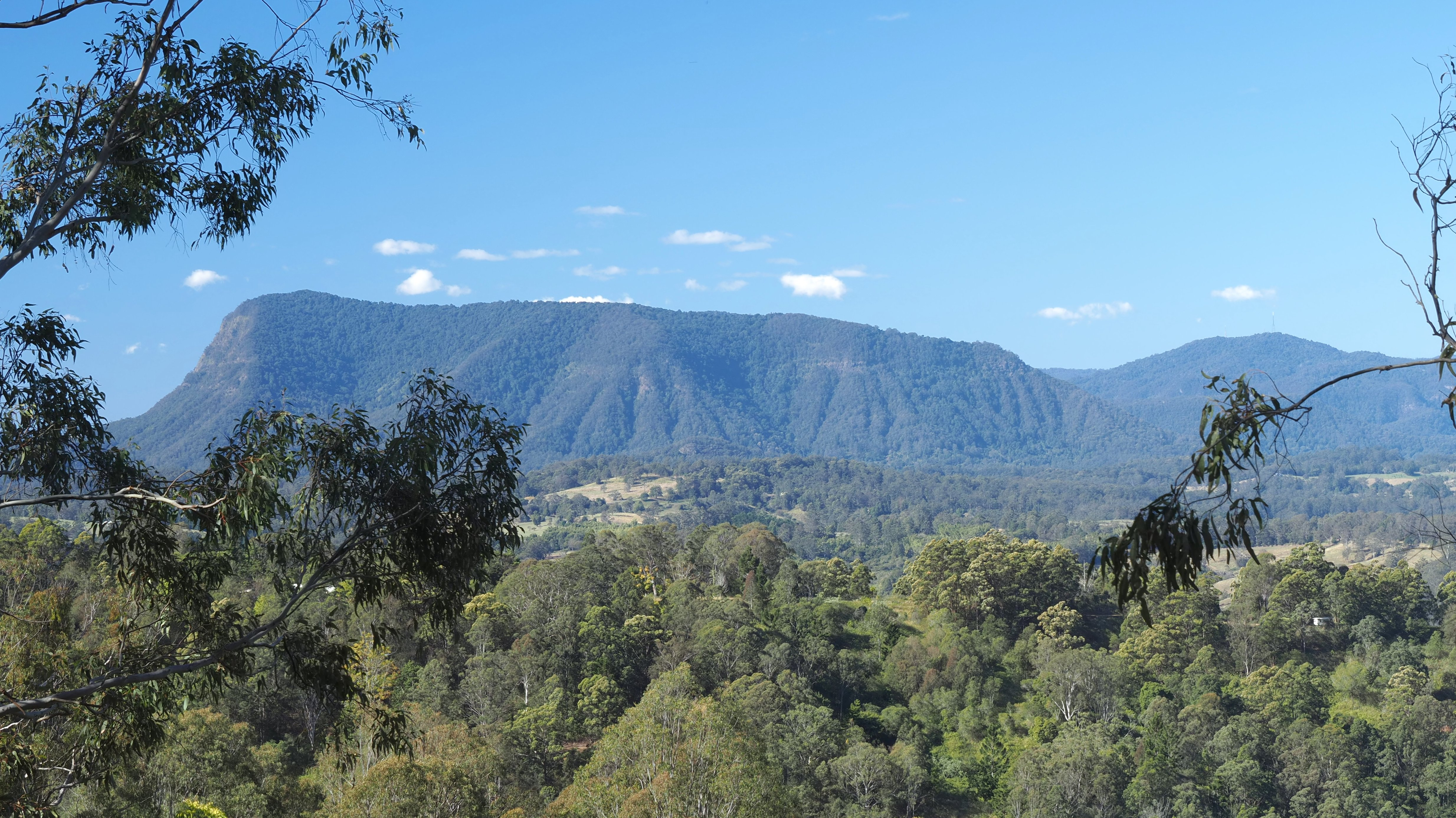
Distant view of Mount Burrell, the westernmost portion of the Nightcap Range

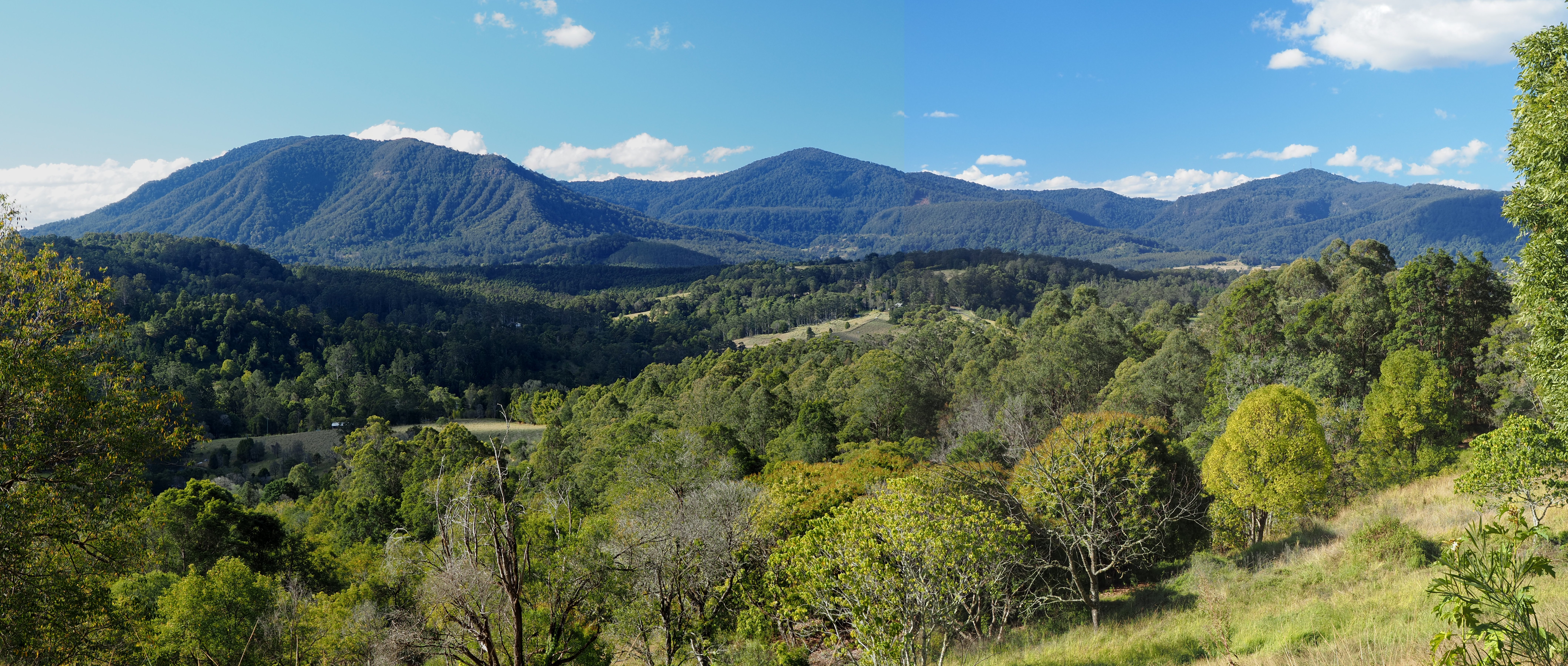
The Nightcap Range in NSW, Australia, distant view from south-west

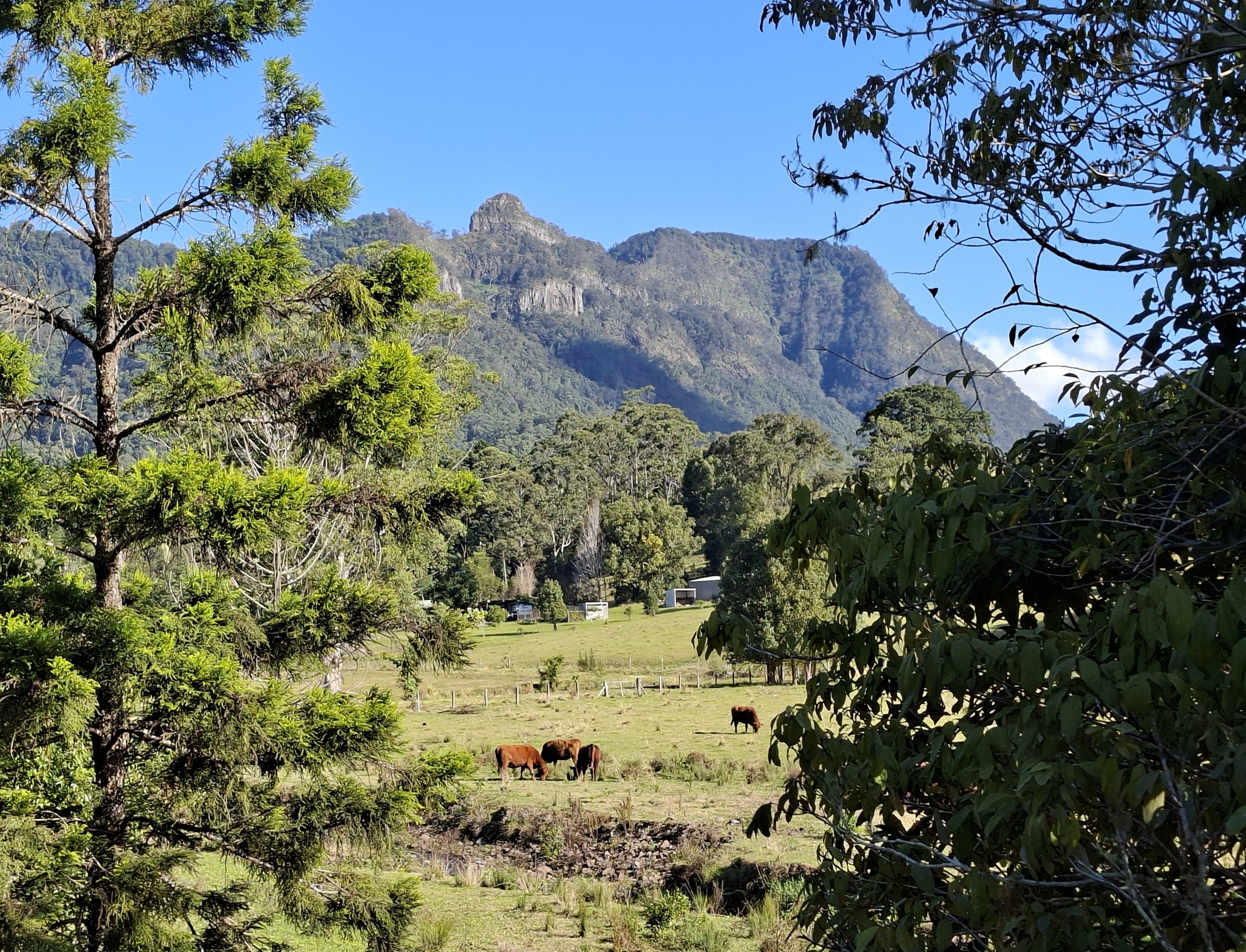
Sphinx Rock on Mt Burrell, viewed from the north

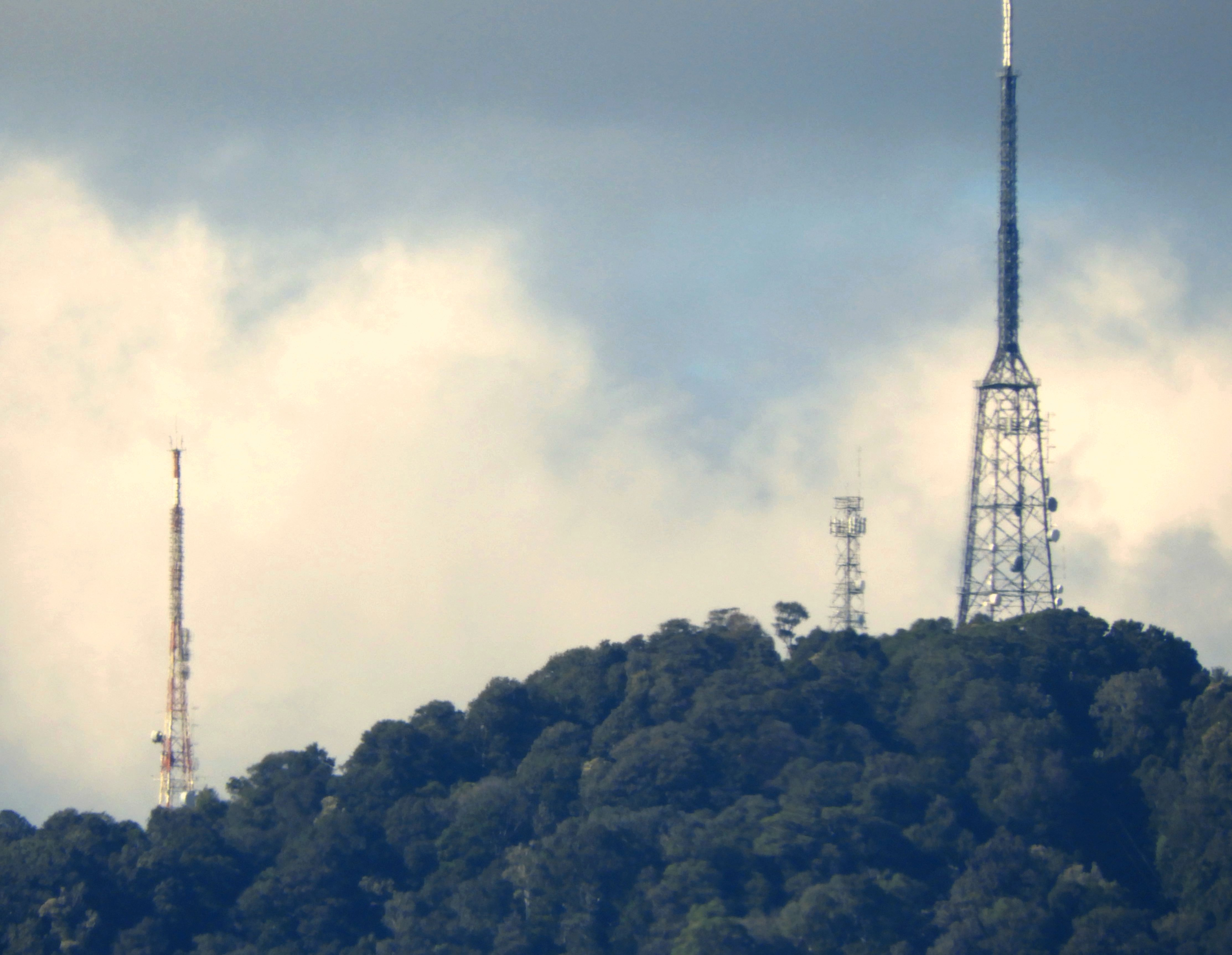
Telephoto view of the three transmission towers on Mount Nardi

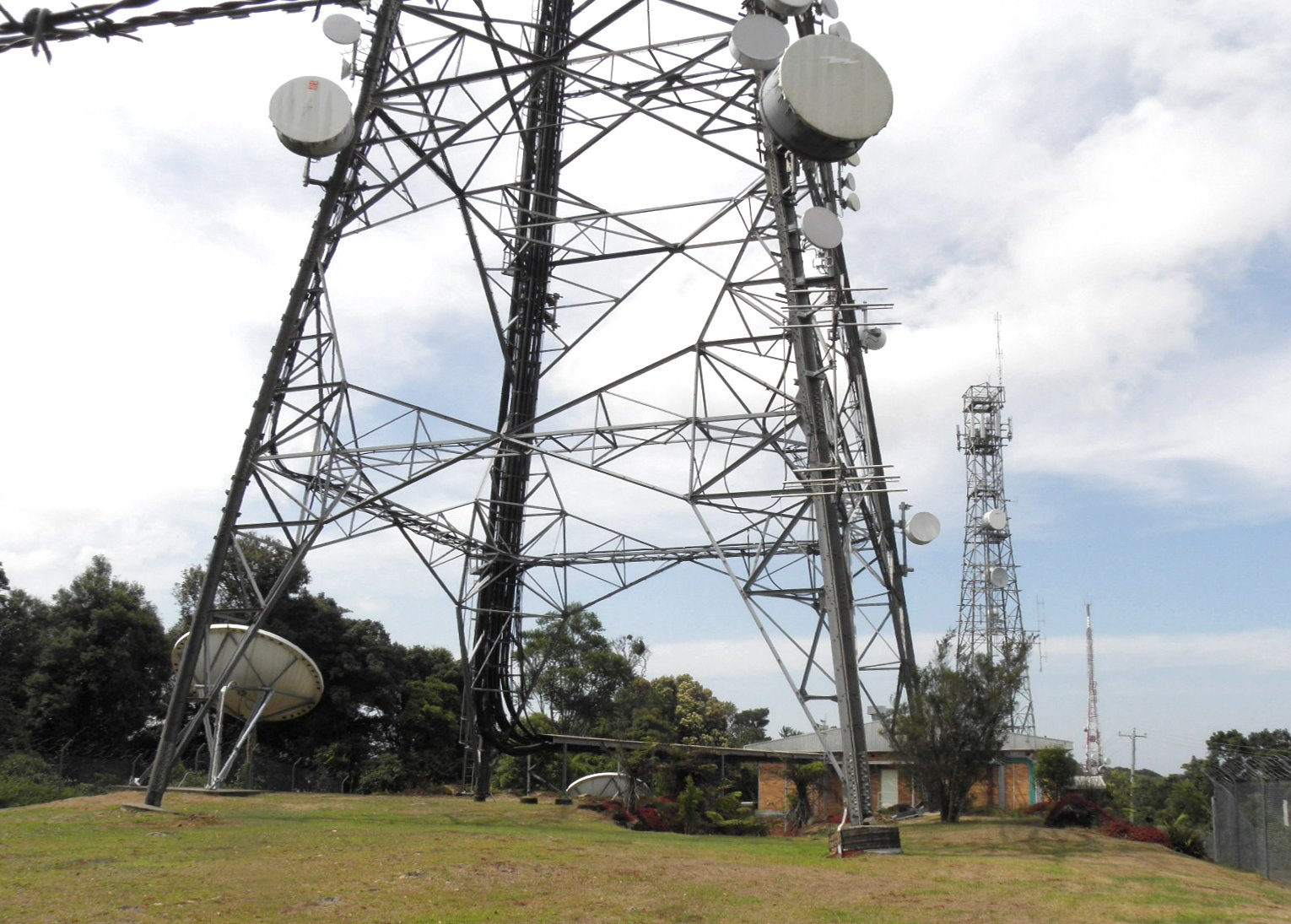
Close-up view of the Mount Nardi transmission towers; from the front: the ABRN6 digital TV tower; the central tower (Telstra-2); the NRN8 (originally: RTN-8) original analogue TV tower

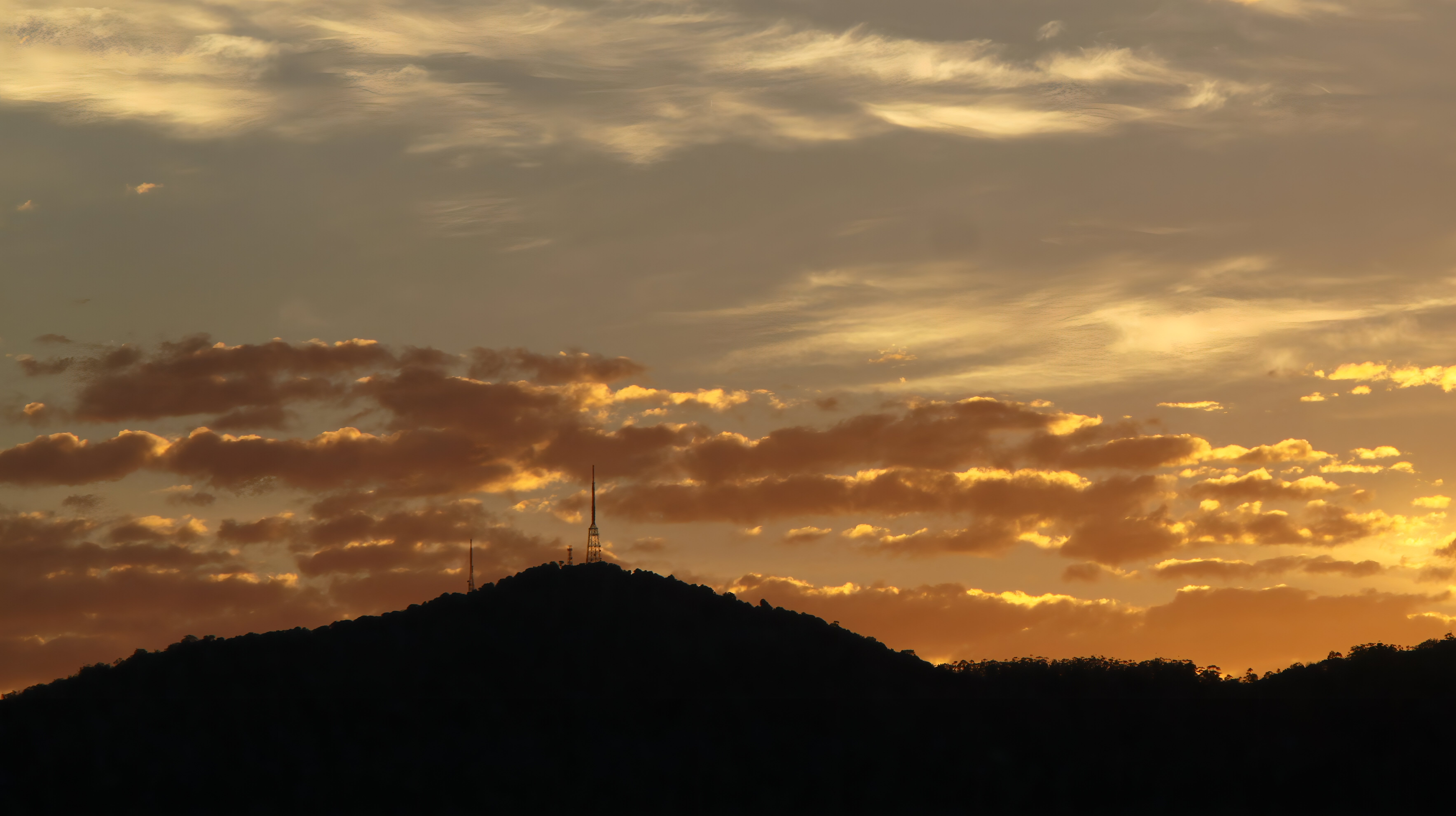
Sunrise over the summit of Mount Nardi from the south, showing the radio and digital television transmission towers

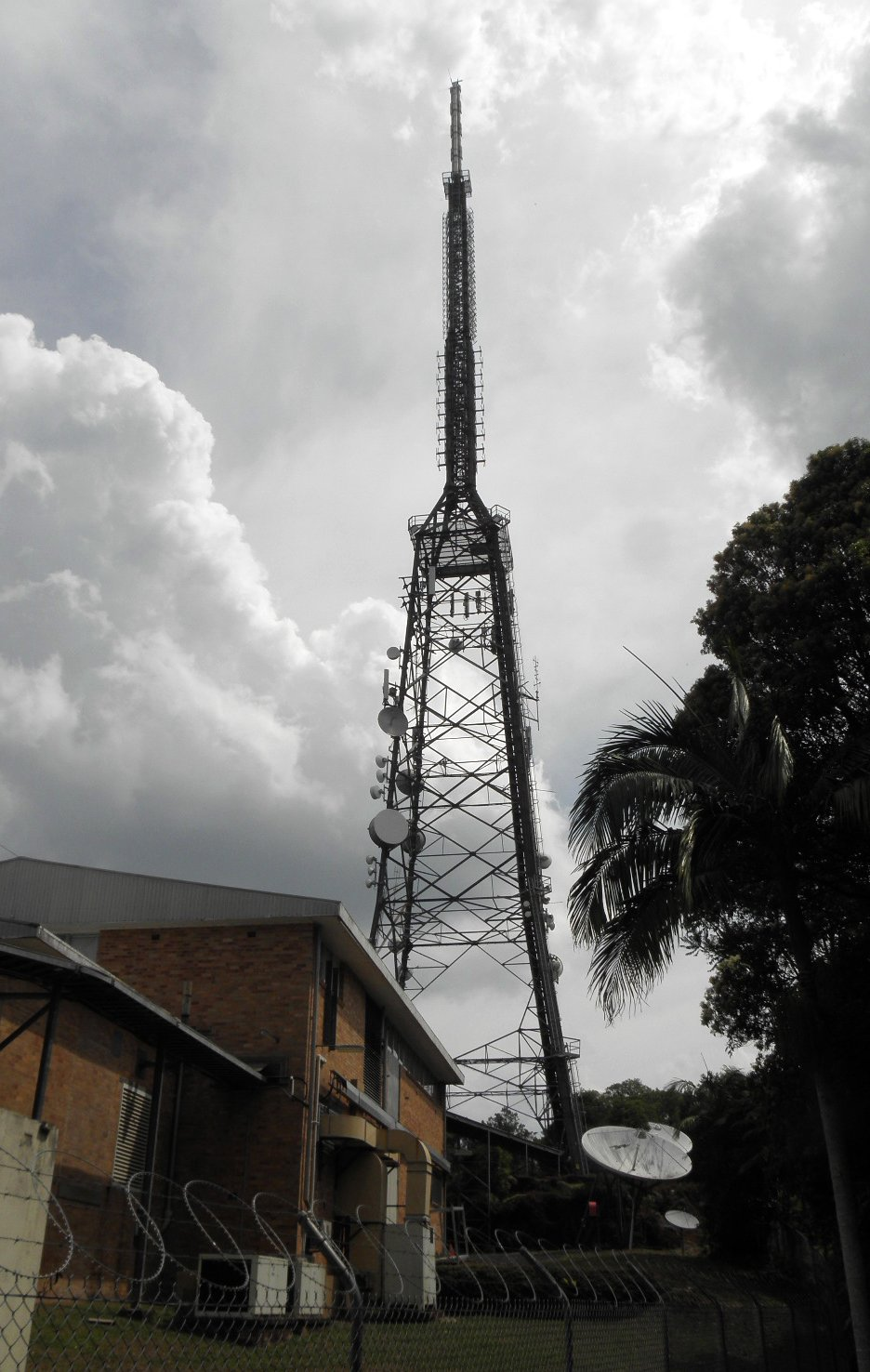
Communications towers on Mount Nardi, New South Wales, Australia: the ABRN-6 tower (digital TV + more)

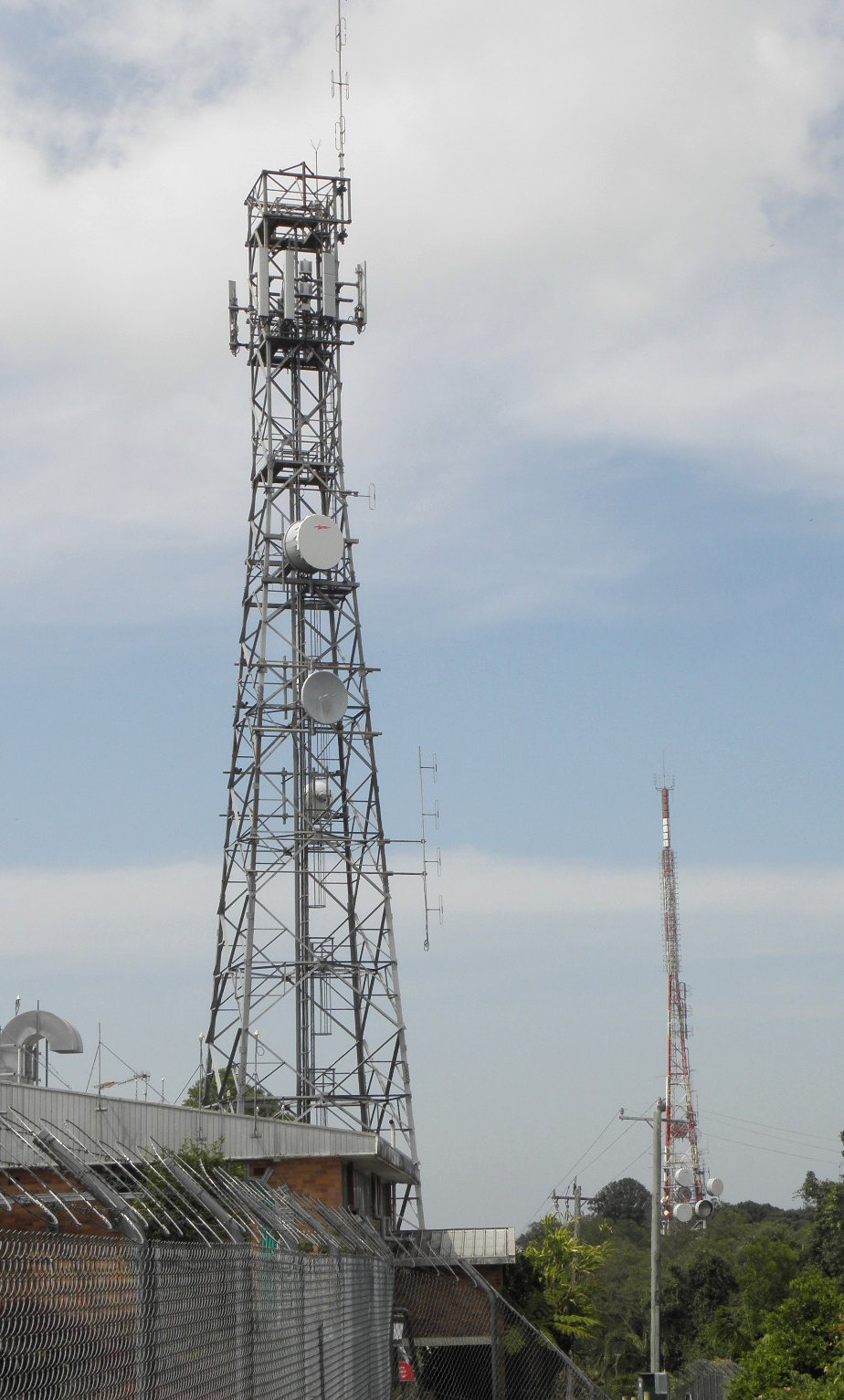
Communications towers on Mount Nardi, New South Wales, Australia: the central tower (Telstra-2)

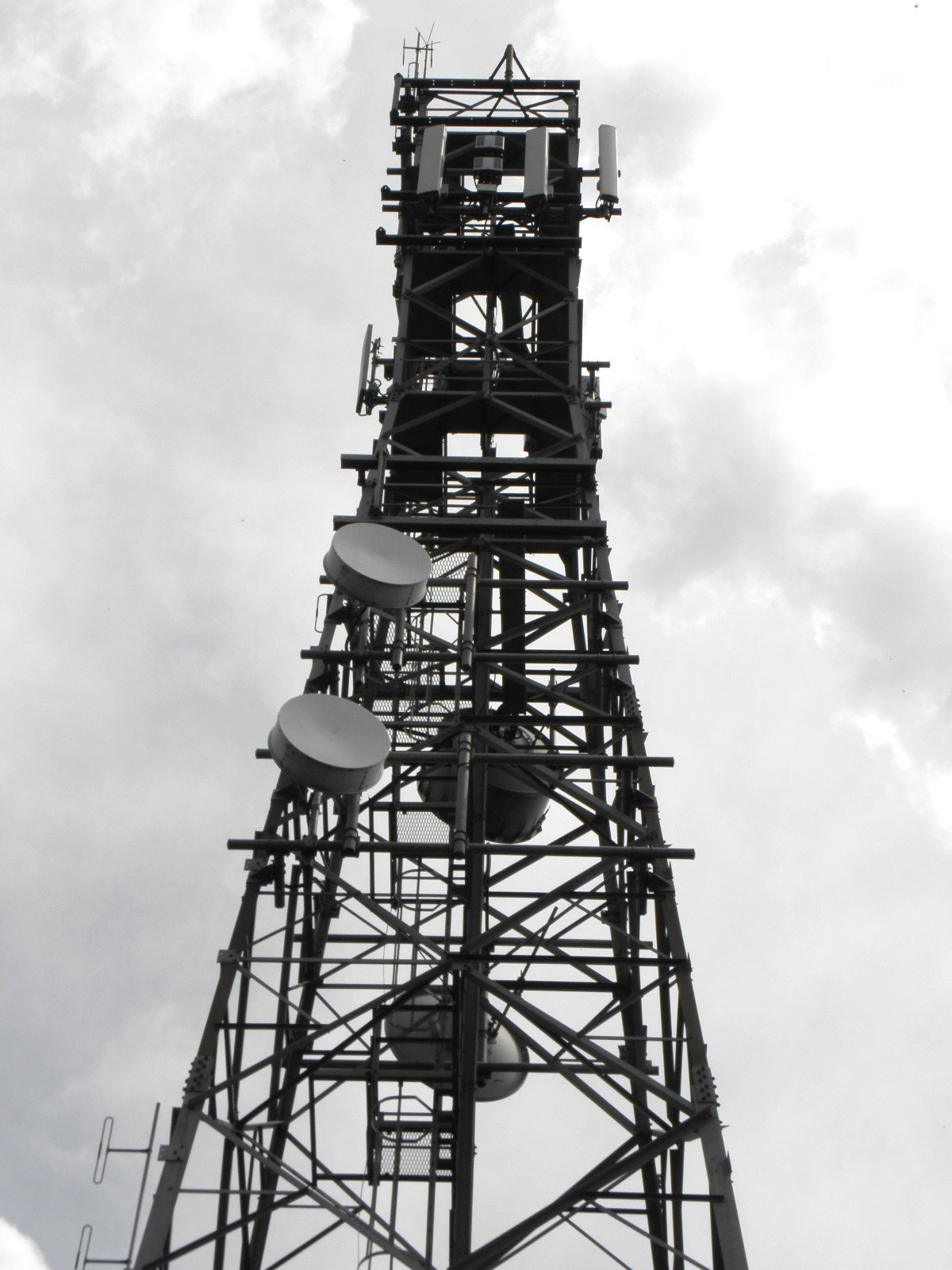
Communications towers on Mount Nardi, New South Wales, Australia: the central tower (Telstra-2) - detail

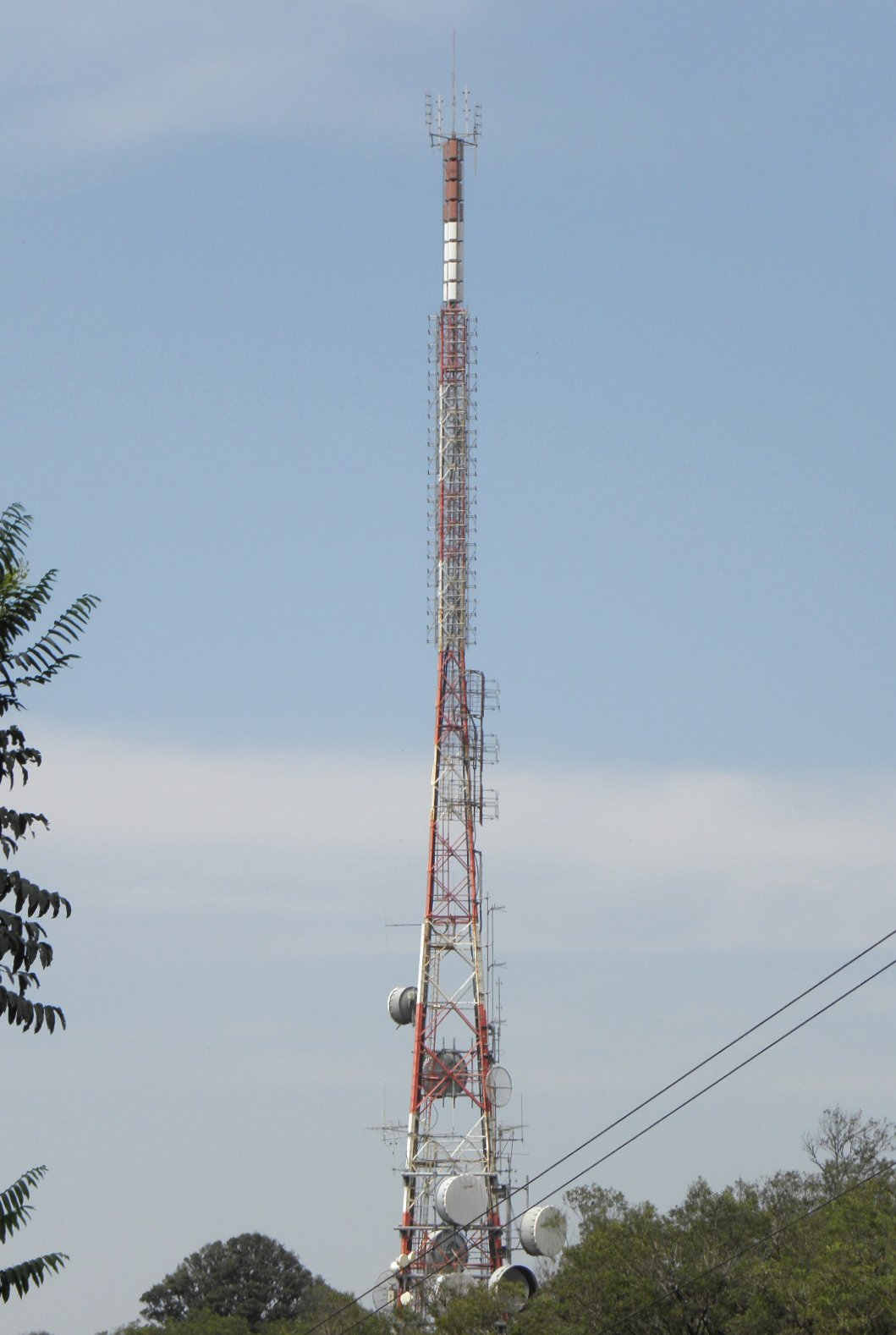
Communications towers on Mount Nardi, New South Wales, Australia: the NRN8 (originally: RTN-8) tower (former analogue TV + other current uses)

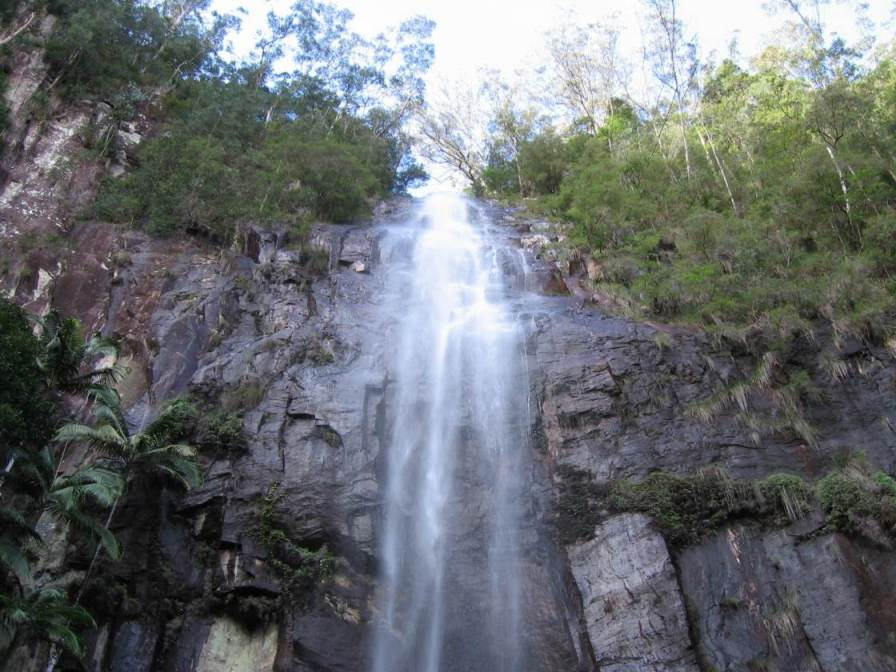
Protesters Falls

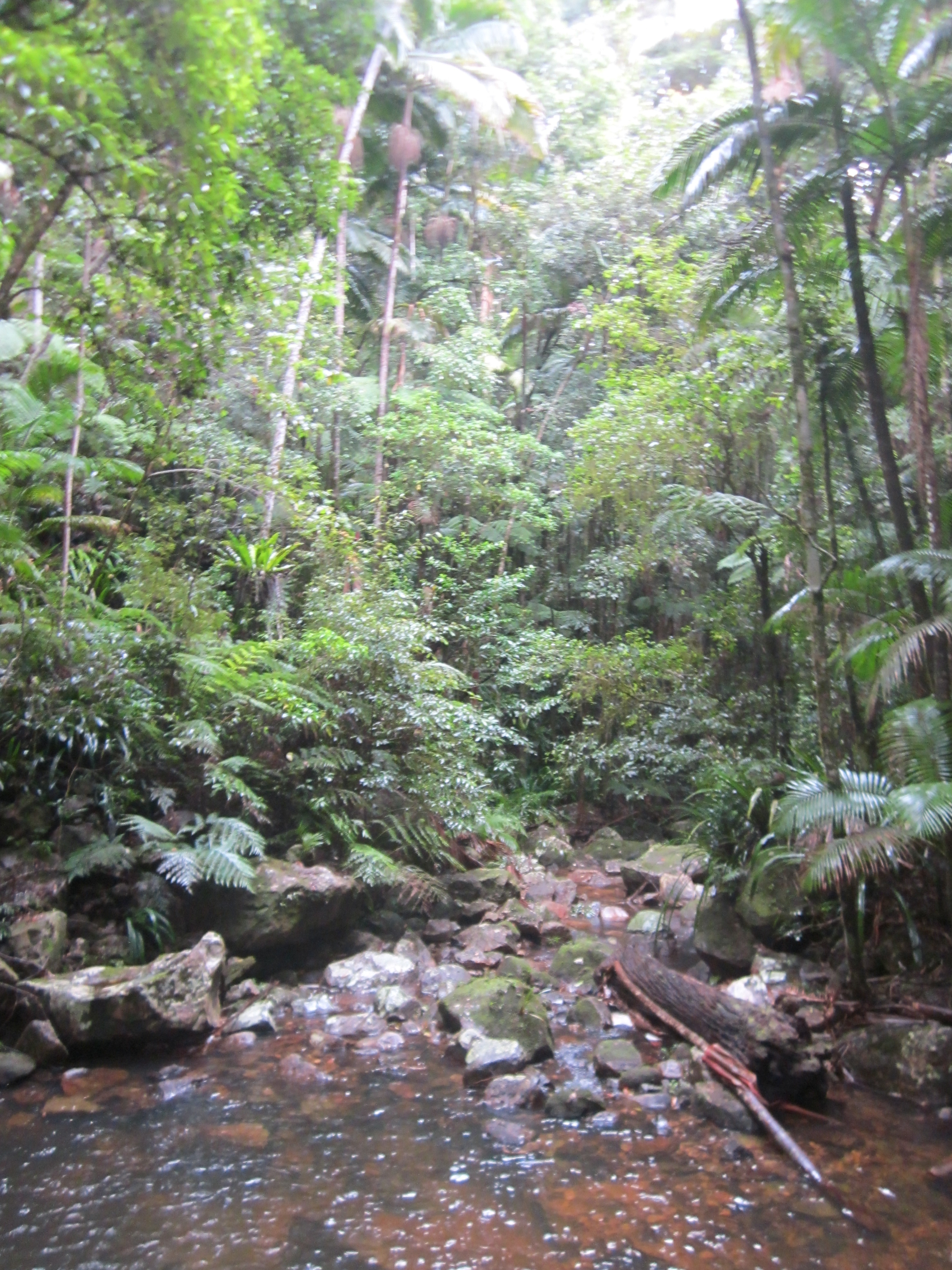
Rainforest at Protesters Falls, Nightcap NP

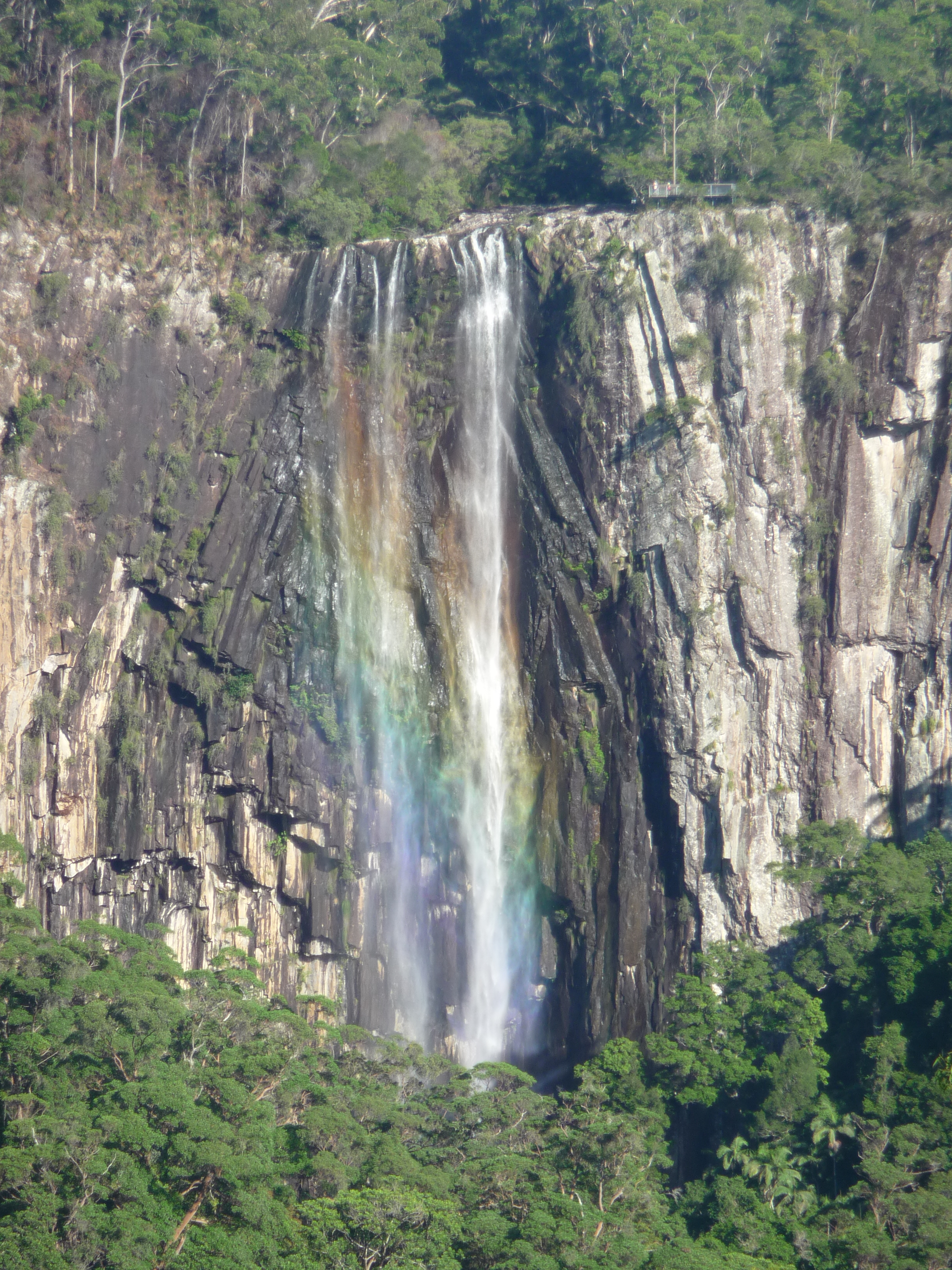
Rainbow through Minyon Falls

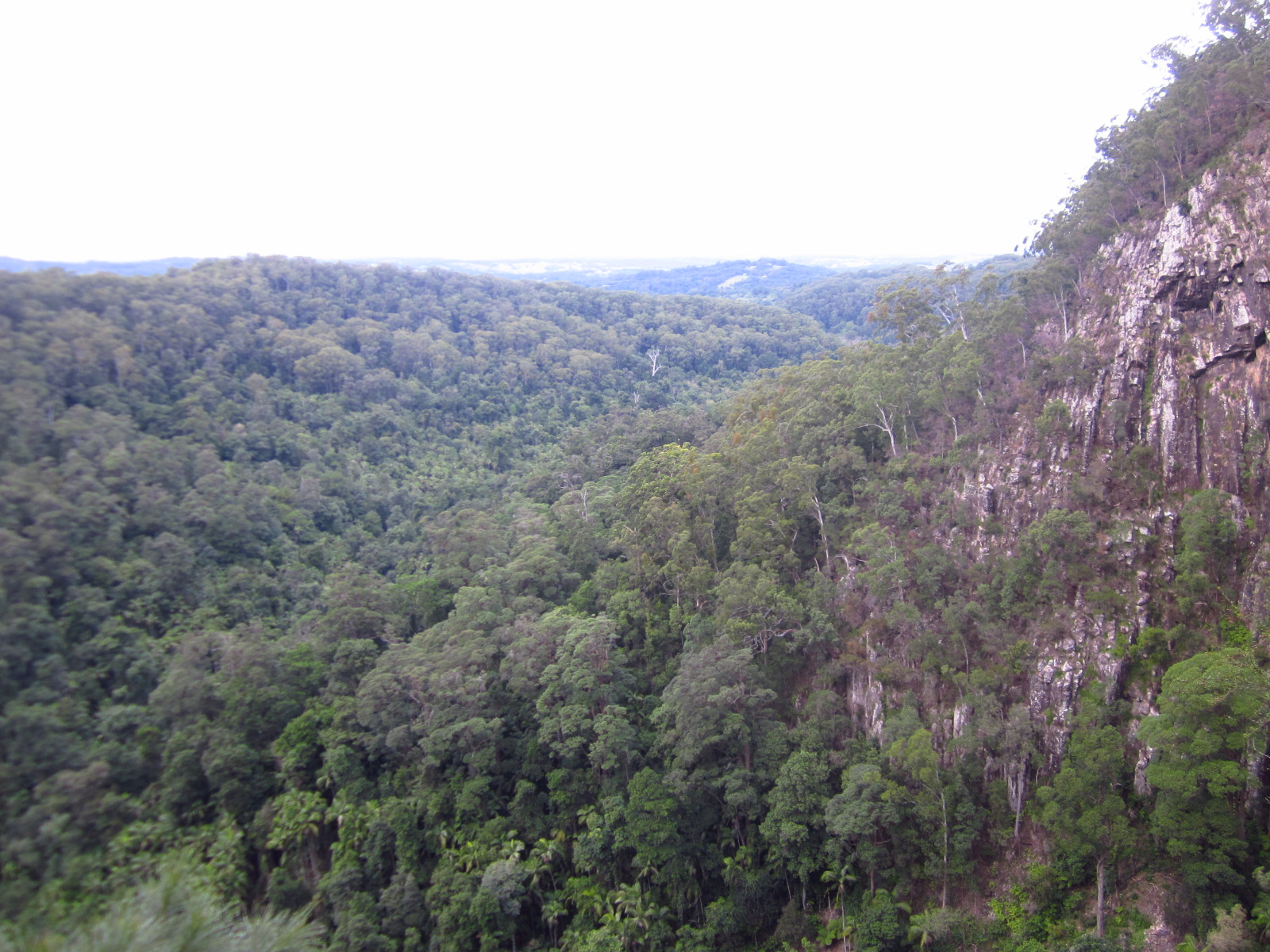
View at Minyon Falls, Nightcap NP

== See also ==
- List of mountains of Australia § New South Wales
