= Namea brisbanensis =

Scientific classification
- Kingdom: Animalia
- Phylum: Arthropoda
- Subphylum: Chelicerata
- Class: Arachnida
- Order: Araneae
- Infraorder: Mygalomorphae
- Family: Anamidae
- Genus: Namea
- Species: N. brisbanensis

Binomial name
- Namea brisbanensis Raven, 1984

Species of spider

Namea brisbanensis is a species of mygalomorph spider in the Anamidae family. It is endemic to Australia. It was described in 1984 by Australian arachnologist Robert Raven.

== Distribution and habitat ==
The species occurs in south-eastern Queensland, in the Moreton district, in closed and open forest habitats. The type locality is Brookfield, a rural suburb of Brisbane.

== Behaviour ==
The spiders are fossorial, terrestrial predators.
