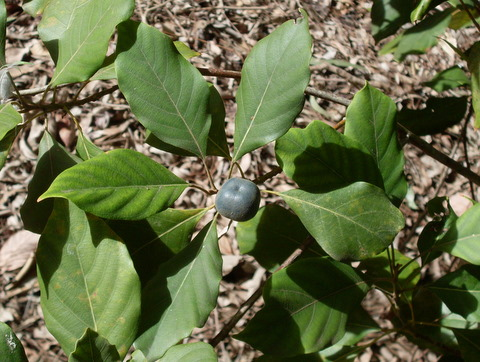
- Juvenile Elaeocarpus sedentarius

Conservation status
- Endangered (EPBC Act)

Scientific classification
- Kingdom: Plantae
- Clade: Tracheophytes
- Clade: Angiosperms
- Clade: Eudicots
- Clade: Rosids
- Order: Oxalidales
- Family: Elaeocarpaceae
- Genus: Elaeocarpus
- Species: E. sedentarius

Binomial name
- Elaeocarpus sedentarius Maynard & Crayn

Synonyms
- Elaeocarpus sp. 2 Minyon; Elaeocarpus sp. Minyon; Elaeocarpus sp. Rocky Creek (Hunter s.n. 16 Sep 1993); Elaeocarpus sp. Rocky Creek (G.Read AQ 562114); Elaeocarpus sp. Whian Whian (G.Read AQ 562114)

= Elaeocarpus sedentarius =

Minyon quandong

Species of flowering plant endemic to Australia

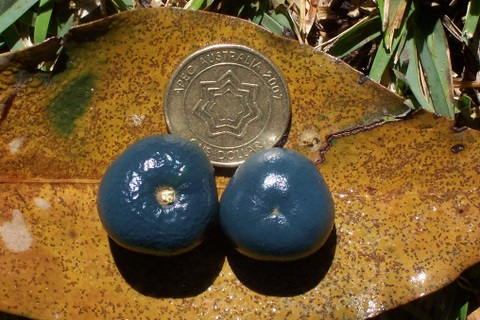
Fruit next to a dollar coin, on a brush box leaf

Elaeocarpus sedentarius, commonly known as Minyon quandong, is a species of flowering plant in the family Elaeocarpaceae and is endemic to a restricted area of New South Wales, Australia. It is a medium-sized to large tree with elliptic to egg-shaped leaves, racemes of whitish flowers and more or less spherical blue fruit.

== Description ==
Elaeocarpus sedentarius is a tree that typically grows to a height of up to 30 m (98 ft). The leaves are simple, (strictly compound with only one leaflet), elliptic to egg-shaped with the narrower end towards the base, mostly 70–150 mm (2.8–5.9 in) long and 40–80 mm (1.6–3.1 in) wide on a petiole 30–60 mm (1.2–2.4 in) long, sometimes with wavy edges. The lower surface of the leaves is glaucous with scattered hairs and old leaves turn orange to dull red before falling. The flowers are borne in small groups along a raceme 20–50 mm (0.79–1.97 in) long, each flower on a pedicel 2–4 mm (0.079–0.157 in) long. The petals are 5–7 mm (0.20–0.28 in) long, the tip divided into about fifteen linear lobes and there are about twenty-five stamens. Flowering occurs in spring or summer and the is a fruit blue, more or less spherical drupe 20–35 mm (0.79–1.38 in) in diameter with a sculptured stone.

== Taxonomy ==
Elaeocarpus sedentarius was first formally described in 2008 by David J. Maynard and Darren M. Crayn in Australian Systematic Botany from specimens collected by Maynard in Mount Jerusalem National Park.

== Distribution and habitat ==
Minyon quandong grows in warm-temperate rainforest in a small area on the south of the Mount Warning caldera in northern New South Wales. A single wild tree was also discovered in the north of the caldera, approximately 35 km north of the rest of the populations. This tree occurs in brush box ecotone areas and warm temperate rainforests.

== Conservation status ==
This quandong is listed as endangered under the Australian Government Environment Protection and Biodiversity Conservation Act 1999 and the New South Wales Government Biodiversity Conservation Act 2016. A Recovery Plan for the species (as Elaeocarpus sp. Rocky Creek) has been prepared.
