= Goonengerry, New South Wales =

Goonengerry
- Town
- Coordinates: 28°36′38″S 153°26′22″E
- Country: Australia
- State: New South Wales
- LGA: Byron Shire

Government
  - State electorate: Ballina
  - Federal division: Richmond

Population
  - Total: 366 (2016 census)
- Postcode: 2482

Goonengerry is a locality located in the Northern Rivers Region of New South Wales. It sits within the Byron Shire local government area and is 26 kilometres (16 mi) from the regional centre of Byron Bay.

It contains the Goonengerry National Park, once known as the Tom Rummery Forest, which was once used for logging and is now protected due to its significant environmental values and the number of Albert's lyrebird living there.

The park is located on the traditional lands of the Widjabul Wia-bal People of the Bundjalung Nation who are its traditional custodians.

== Origin of place name ==
The name Goonengerry comes from the Bundjalung language and it is a combination of the words 'gunang', meaning excrement or waste matter, and 'gir' (also written 'gerry') meaning wish.

In the early years of European colonisation it was often spelt 'Gooningerry'.

== European history ==
The land that now makes up Goonengerry was first selected by John Somerville in 1884, parts of which were then taken over by William Ashmore Sheaffe by 1898. It was Sheaffe who then leased a section of his property, known as 'Tugela' to establish a school and it was then that the first teacher Thomas Hamilton was appointed. Hamilton had no formal teaching qualifications and it was his first position; he was said to have been conscientious but that he adopted crude methods and harsh discipline. The school, Goonengerry School, was then opened in 1890 and smaller residential and rural lots started to be created.

In 1921 the first timber mill, a Hollingsworth, was built there in 1921 and, in 1924, a post office was formally opened there and operated from an old farmhouse opposite the school. In 1925 the Northern Star declared that Goonengerry was "rapidly growing into a small township". Women represented their own interests when they formed the Women's Guild, based at the Goonengery Church in 1926. Their meeting where often hosted at the home of Charlotte Rummery who acted as a voluntary 'bush nurse' and would help those in need from the 1920s to the 1940s.

In 1931, Goonengerry attracted national attention when a local dairy farmer Sam Wiley 'made a stand' against the Board of Tick Control as he objected to the compulsory dipping or spraying of cattle as he believed their milk suffered. Wiley, and his family, did everything they could to prevent their stock being sprayed and his daughter, Edna Wiley, was almost arrested for the language she used to the officials and police who became involved. Much of the media attention, primarily from the Smith's Weekly, likened it to the Eureka Stockade and painted the family as folk heroes fighting for justice. Wiley, who petitioned for a Royal Commission into an alleged miscarriage of justice, chose to spend 63 days in Grafton Gaol rather than pay the £54 of fines he accrued throughout the incident; he called it a 'strategic retirement'.

In the 1940s much of Goonengerry (what would become Goonengerry National Park) was acquired by the Banana Growers Federation who called it Tom Rummery Forest. This name was in honour of a forestry inspector of the same name.

An active member and landowner in the Goonengerry community from the early 1930s was Gino Pagura (1906–2002), an Italian migrant, who was officer-in-charge of all banana transport between 1932 and 1939. In 1942 he was called up for a medical examination and was arrested for using insulting words to a police officer with these words being: 'I am a better Australian than you'; he was found guilty and fined £1. Pagura would go on to be prominent in the New Settler League and was later the first migrant on the Banana Growers Federation board of directors.

Some areas of Goonengerry have also been used to mine perlite, a volcanic glass, with a large discovery being made in the 1960s. To mine this perlite a 100 tonne sample was taken from 70m of a ridge line leading to environmental degradation and no further perlite was taken at that time. In 1988 another company expressed interest in the deposit and many local residents protested that and formed an action group called People for the Environment and Rural Lifestyle (PEARL) who were successful in stopping this bid. One of the local residents to be involved in this group was Val Hodgson who would later lead the campaign to create what is now the Goonengerry National Park and, later, also the Byrangery Grass Reserve.

The demographics of Goonengerry changed significantly during the 1970s, especially following the fourth Nimbin Aquarius Festival in 1973, which attracted thousands of hippies to the region. At least one local resident, Marlene McNaughton, allowed a group of these new arrivals to stay at one of her properties for a peppercorn rent and work in exchange for food. Another significant shift came in 2020 as an increase of people were able to work from during and following the COVID-19 pandemic which saw people move from the larger cities.

Gregory Peel Smith, a long time homeless man who had experienced much trauma in his life, spent the 1990s living in the rainforest of Goonengerry and later wrote about these experiences in his book: Out of the Forest: the true story of a recluse (2020).
