= Namea nebo =

Scientific classification
- Kingdom: Animalia
- Phylum: Arthropoda
- Subphylum: Chelicerata
- Class: Arachnida
- Order: Araneae
- Infraorder: Mygalomorphae
- Family: Anamidae
- Genus: Namea
- Species: N. nebo

Binomial name
- Namea nebo Rix, Wilson & Harvey, 2020

Species of spider

Namea nebo is a species of mygalomorph spider in the Anamidae family. It is endemic to Australia. It was described in 2020 by Michael Rix, Jeremy Wilson and Mark Harvey.

== Distribution and habitat ==
The species occurs in south-eastern Queensland in rainforest habitats. The type locality is Mount Nebo in the D'Aguilar Range near Brisbane.
