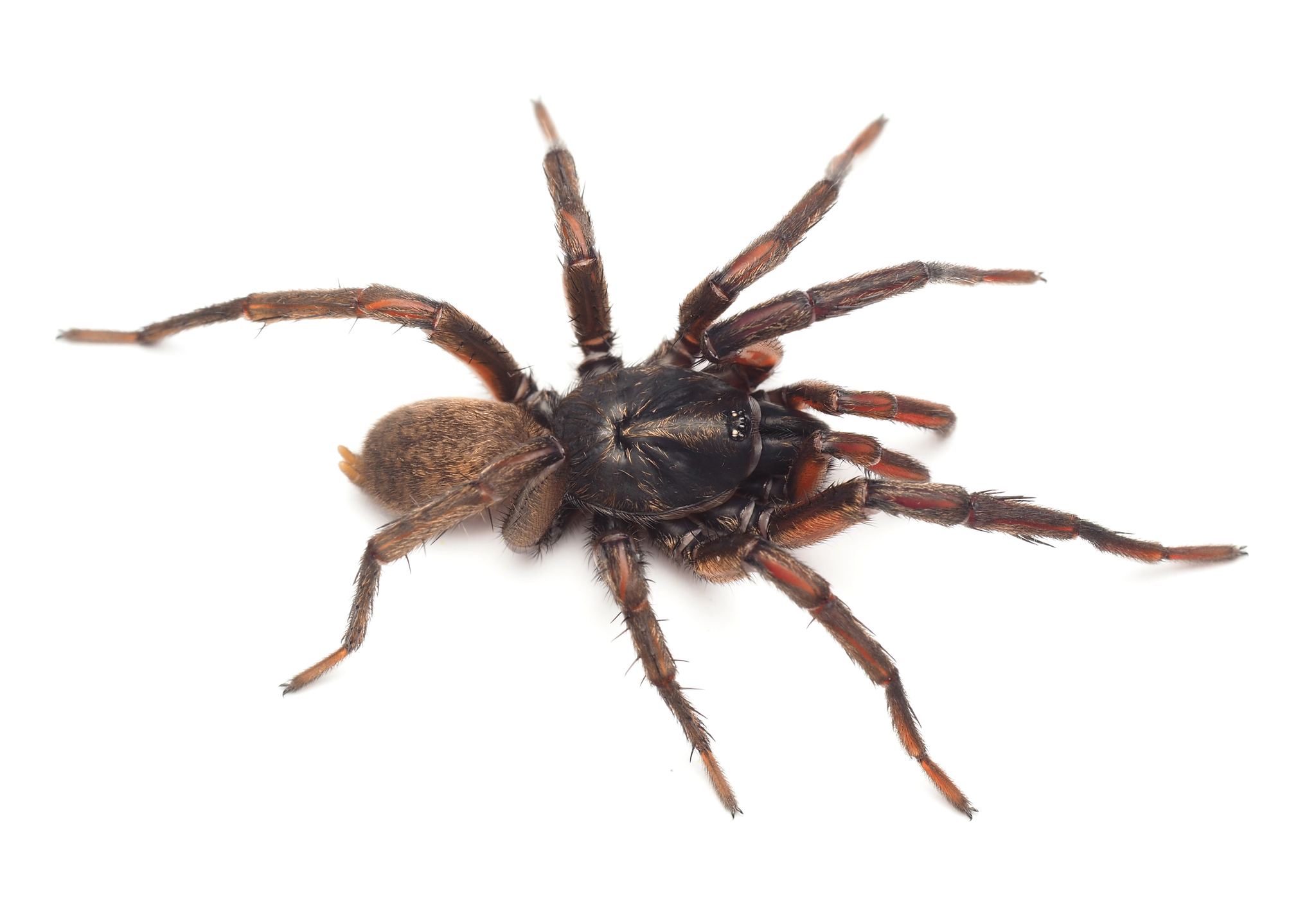

Scientific classification
- Kingdom: Animalia
- Phylum: Arthropoda
- Subphylum: Chelicerata
- Class: Arachnida
- Order: Araneae
- Infraorder: Mygalomorphae
- Family: Anamidae
- Genus: Namea
- Species: N. excavans

Binomial name
- Namea excavans Raven, 1984

= Namea excavans =

Species of spider

Namea excavans is a species of mygalomorph spider in the family Anamidae. It is endemic to Australia. It was described in 1984 by Australian arachnologist Robert Raven.

== Distribution and habitat ==
The species occurs in south-eastern Queensland in closed forest habitats. The type locality is Mount Glorious, in the D'Aguilar Range, near Brisbane. It is also known from Mount Mee.

== Behaviour ==
The spiders are fossorial, terrestrial predators.
