= Namea flavomaculata =

Scientific classification
- Kingdom: Animalia
- Phylum: Arthropoda
- Subphylum: Chelicerata
- Class: Arachnida
- Order: Araneae
- Infraorder: Mygalomorphae
- Family: Anamidae
- Genus: Namea
- Species: N. flavomaculata

Binomial name
- Namea flavomaculata (Rainbow & Pulleine, 1918)

Synonyms
- Aname flavomaculata Rainbow & Pulleine, 1918

Species of spider

Namea flavomaculata is a species of mygalomorph spider in the Anamidae family. It is endemic to Australia. It was described in 1918 by Australian arachnologists William Joseph Rainbow and Robert Henry Pulleine.

== Distribution and habitat ==
The species occurs in the subtropical rainforested Scenic Rim border ranges between south-eastern Queensland and north-eastern New South Wales in closed forest habitats. The type locality is Tamborine Mountain.

== Behaviour ==
The spiders are fossorial, terrestrial predators.
