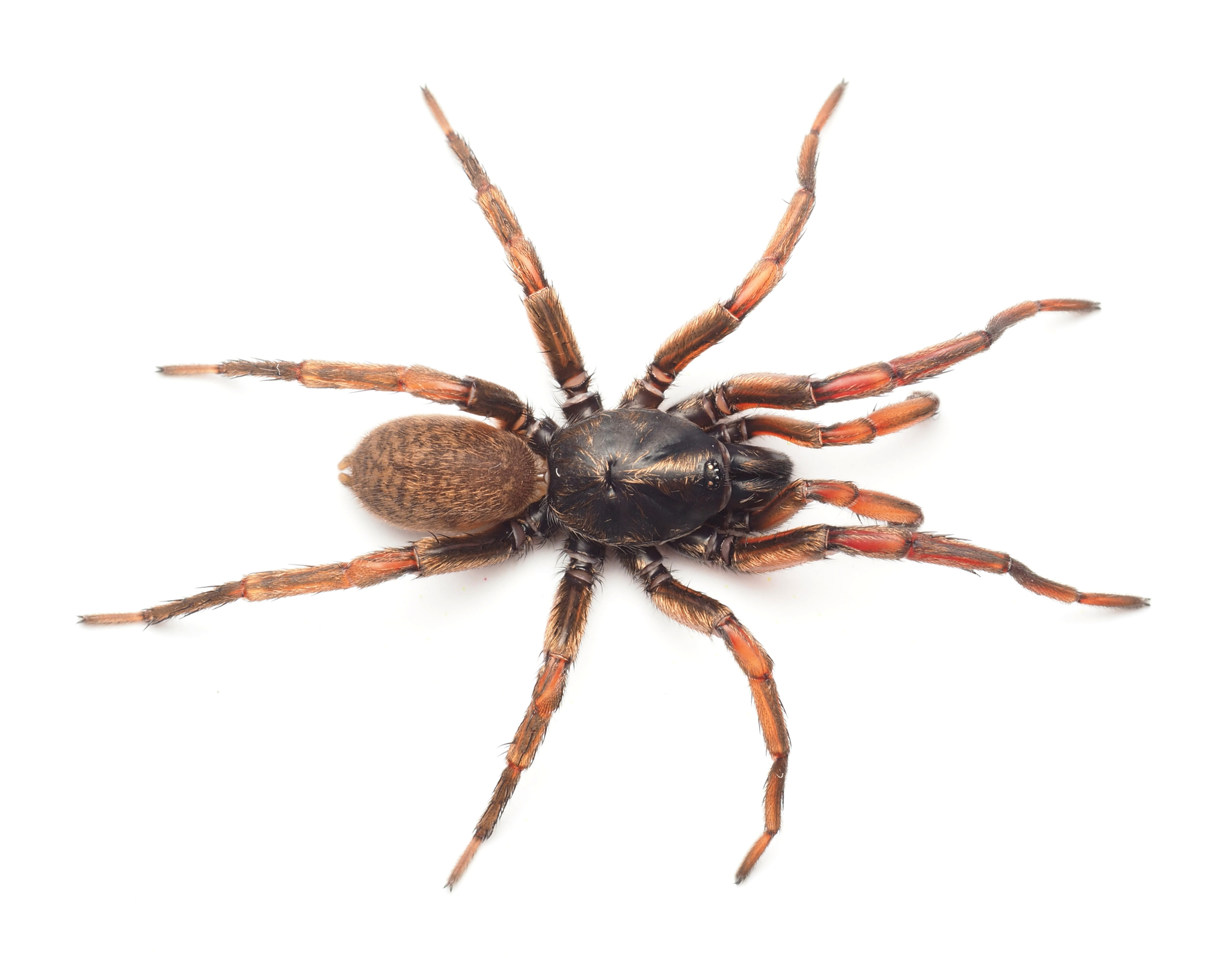
- Namea nigritarsus

Scientific classification
- Kingdom: Animalia
- Phylum: Arthropoda
- Subphylum: Chelicerata
- Class: Arachnida
- Order: Araneae
- Infraorder: Mygalomorphae
- Family: Anamidae
- Genus: Namea; Raven, 1984

Type species
- Namea capricornia

Species
- 19, see text

= Namea =

Genus of spiders

Namea is a genus of spiders in the family Anamidae. It is endemic to Australia. It was erected in 1984 by Australian arachnologist Robert Raven. As of 2017, it contains 19 species, all from the states of Queensland (QLD) or New South Wales (NSW).

== Species ==
Namea comprises the following species:

- Namea brisbanensis Raven, 1984 - QLD
- Namea bunya Raven, 1984 - QLD
- Namea calcaria Raven, 1984 - QLD
- Namea callemonda Raven, 1984 - QLD
- Namea capricornia Raven, 1984 - QLD
- Namea cucurbita Raven, 1984 - QLD
- Namea dahmsi Raven, 1984 - QLD
- Namea dicalcaria Raven, 1984 - NSW
- Namea excavans Raven, 1984 - QLD
- Namea flavomaculata (Rainbow & Pulleine, 1918) - QLD
- Namea gloriosa Rix, Wilson & Harvey, 2020 - QLD
- Namea gowardae Rix, Wilson & Harvey, 2020 - QLD
- Namea jimna Raven, 1984 - QLD
- Namea nebo Rix, Wilson & Harvey, 2020 - QLD
- Namea nebulosa Raven, 1984 - QLD
- Namea nigritarsus Rix, Wilson & Harvey, 2020 - QLD
- Namea olympus Raven, 1984 - QLD
- Namea salanitri Raven, 1984 - QLD, NSW
- Namea saundersi Raven, 1984 - QLD
