= Namea olympus =

Scientific classification
- Kingdom: Animalia
- Phylum: Arthropoda
- Subphylum: Chelicerata
- Class: Arachnida
- Order: Araneae
- Infraorder: Mygalomorphae
- Family: Anamidae
- Genus: Namea
- Species: N. olympus

Binomial name
- Namea olympus Raven, 1984

Species of spider

Namea olympus is a species of mygalomorph spider in the Anamidae family. It is endemic to Australia. It was described in 1984 by Australian arachnologist Robert Raven.

== Distribution and habitat ==
The species occurs in north-eastern Queensland, in closed forest habitats. The type locality is Mount Bartle Frere in the Bellenden Ker Range.

== Behaviour ==
The spiders are fossorial, terrestrial predators.
