= Namea salanitri =

Scientific classification
- Kingdom: Animalia
- Phylum: Arthropoda
- Subphylum: Chelicerata
- Class: Arachnida
- Order: Araneae
- Infraorder: Mygalomorphae
- Family: Anamidae
- Genus: Namea
- Species: N. salanitri

Binomial name
- Namea salanitri Raven, 1984

Species of spider

Namea salanitri, also known as the false funnel-web spider, is a species of mygalomorph spider in the Anamidae family. It is endemic to Australia. It was described in 1984 by Australian arachnologist Robert Raven.

== Distribution and habitat ==
The species occurs in the subtropical border ranges between south-eastern Queensland and north-eastern New South Wales in closed forest habitats. The type locality is Mount Mee.

== Behaviour ==
The spiders are fossorial, terrestrial predators.
