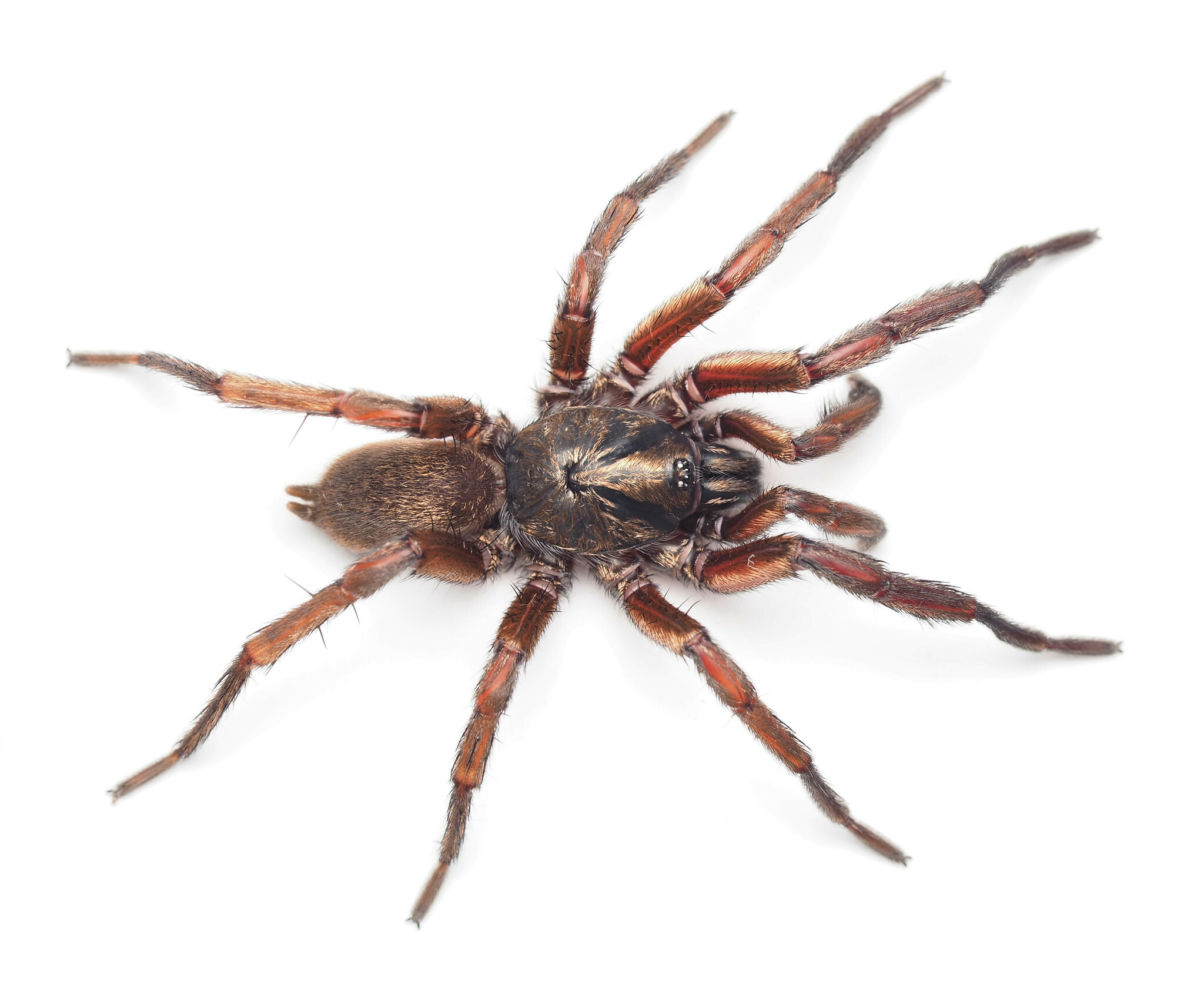

Scientific classification
- Kingdom: Animalia
- Phylum: Arthropoda
- Subphylum: Chelicerata
- Class: Arachnida
- Order: Araneae
- Infraorder: Mygalomorphae
- Family: Anamidae
- Genus: Namea
- Species: N. gloriosa

Binomial name
- Namea gloriosa Rix, Wilson & Harvey, 2020

= Namea gloriosa =

Species of spider

Namea gloriosa is a species of mygalomorph spider in the family Anamidae. It is endemic to Australia. It was first described in 2020 by Michael Rix, Jeremy Wilson and Mark Harvey.

== Distribution and habitat ==
The species occurs in south-eastern Queensland in rainforest habitats. Type localities include Mount Glorious and Tenison-Woods Mountain in the D'Aguilar Range near Brisbane.
