= Nightcap (1953 TV program) =

Canadian music variety television program

- Genre: Musical variety show
- Presented by: Alan Mills
- Country of origin: Canada
- Original language: English
- No. of seasons: 1

Production
- Production location: Montreal
- Running time: 30 minutes

Original release
- Network: CBC Television
- Release: 21 October 1953 – 6 July 1954

Nightcap is a Canadian musical variety show that aired on CBC Television from 1953 to 1954.

== Premise ==
The set of this Montreal-produced program resembled a cabaret club in which host Alan Mills would introduce guest performers. Series regulars included Nina Dova (vocals), Gilberto Assais (piano) and William Robert Fournier who portrayed the club's waiter.

== Scheduling ==
This half-hour program was broadcast during the 1953–1954 season as follows:

Day	Time	Season run
Wednesdays	10:30 p.m.	21 October to 27 December 1953
Fridays	10:30 p.m.	12 February to 28 May 1954
Tuesdays	9:30 p.m.	1 June to 6 July 1954
