= Nightcap Range Important Bird Area =

Important Bird Area in New South Wales, Australia

Coordinates: 28°32′43″S 153°20′20″E

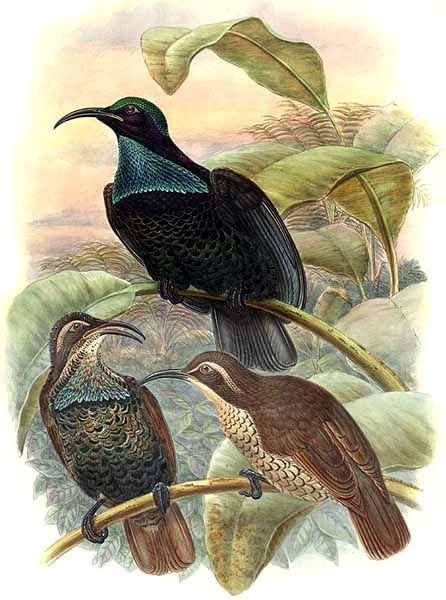
The IBA is an important area for paradise riflebirds

The Nightcap Range Important Bird Area is a 157 km^{2} fragmented tract of land containing several protected areas of rainforest in the Nightcap Range of north-eastern New South Wales, Australia. Some 61% of the site is included in the Gondwana Rainforests of Australia World Heritage Area.

== Description ==
The site consists of the Nightcap, Mount Jerusalem and Goonengerry National Parks, Snows Gully Nature Reserve and the Whian Whian State Conservation Area. The altitude ranges from 250–933 m above sea level. Where the soils have a rhyolitic base the vegetation is warm temperate rainforest, while areas of nutrient-rich basaltic soils support subtropical rainforest. The annual average rainfall, of 2351 mm at an altitude of 380 m, is the highest of any region in NSW, with average winter temperatures of 7-17 °C and summer temperatures of 17-27 °C.

== Birds ==
The site has been identified by BirdLife International as an Important Bird Area (IBA) because it contains the largest known population of Albert's lyrebirds, as well as populations of pale-yellow robins, paradise riflebirds, green catbirds, regent bowerbirds and Australian logrunners.
