= Mount Jerusalem National Park =

National park in New South Wales, Australia

- IUCN category II (national park)
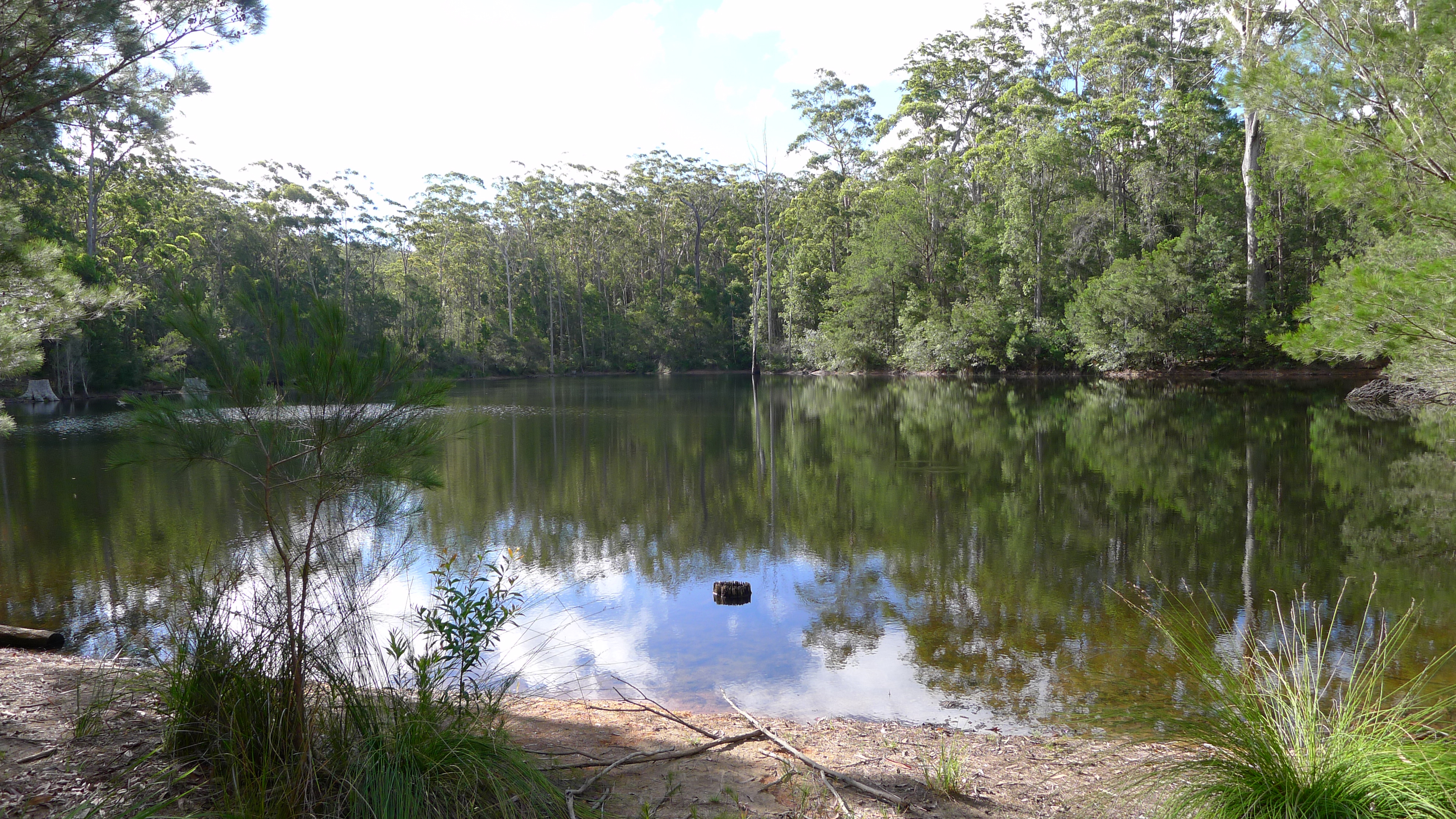
- Lake on Koonyum Range, Mount Jerusalem National Park, December 2014

- Location within New South Wales
- Location: New South Wales
- Coordinates: 28°29′04″S 153°21′28″E
- Area: 52 km^{2} (20 sq mi)
- Established: 1995
- Governing body: NSW National Parks & Wildlife Service
- Website: Official website

Mount Jerusalem is a national park in New South Wales, Australia, 635 km north of Sydney. It contains three river systems, Tweed River, Brunswick River and the Richmond River. The park forms the outer rim of Tweed Caldera, a volcano that was active 21 million years ago. Its establishment followed campaigns against logging in the area, including a blockade in the Nullum State Forest in 1995.

== Important Bird Area ==
The park lies within the Nightcap Range Important Bird Area, so identified by BirdLife International because it contains the largest known population of Albert's lyrebirds, as well as several other significant bird species.

== See also ==
- Protected areas of New South Wales
- Byron Bay, New South Wales
- High Conservation Value Old Growth forest
