= Heru =

Heru may refer to:

== People ==
- Heru Budi Hartono (born 1965), Indonesian politician
- Heru Hartanto Subolo, Indonesian diplomat
- Heru Nerly (1980–2021), Indonesian footballer
- Heru Setyawan (born 1993), Indonesian footballer
- Erwin Heru Susanto (born 1974), Indonesian sprinter
- Tuoba Heru, 4th-century Chinese ruler

== Other uses ==
- Heru (ornamental comb), ornamental comb in Mãori culture
- Horus, ancient Egyptian deity
- Whakamoke heru, species of spiders in New Zealand
