= Hui (disambiguation) =

The Hui people are an ethnic minority group recognised by the People's Republic of China.

Hui or HUI may also refer to:

== People ==
=== Surname and given name ===
- Hui (surname), various Chinese surnames
- Alternate spelling of Hee (Korean name)

=== Mononym ===
- Emperor Hui of Han, the second emperor of the Han dynasty
- King Hui of Chu, king of the State of Chu during the Spring and Autumn period
- King Hui of Wei, a ruler of the state of Wei during the Warring States period
- King Hui of Zhou, king of the Zhou dynasty
- Duke Hui of Qi, ruler of the State of Qi during the Spring and Autumn period
- Duke Hui I of Qin, ruler of the Zhou dynasty state of Qin from 500 to 492 BC
- Duke Hui II of Qin, ruler of the Zhou dynasty state of Qin from 399 to 387 BC
- Hui (priestess), ancient Egyptian priestess during the Eighteenth dynasty, mother-in-law of Thutmose III
- Hui of Balhae (died 817), eighth king of Balhae in modern Korea and Manchuria
- Hui (singer), South Korean singer-songwriter
- Chen Xuezhao or Hui (1906–1991), Chinese writer

== Other uses ==
- Health Utilities Index, rating scale used to measure general health status and health-related quality of life
- Hui County (徽县), a country of Gansu province, China
- HUI Gold Index, an American stock market index of gold mining companies
- Hui (informal loan club), a group-based rotating saving and credit scheme
- Hui (Māori assembly), a gathering of New Zealand Māori people
- Hui people, an ethnic group in China
- Huizhou Chinese, or Hui Chinese, one of the ten primary varieties of the Chinese language
- Hui (secret society), a type of secret brotherhood
- Human User Interface Protocol, an interface between digital audio workstations and connected hardware controllers
- Phu Bai International Airport, Phú Bài, Vietnam (IATA code: HUI)

== See also ==
- Huy (disambiguation)
- Huizhou (disambiguation)
- Wang Hui (disambiguation)
