= Huia (disambiguation) =

Huia is an extinct New Zealand bird species.

Huia may also refer to:

- Huia (frog), a frog genus
- Huia (plant), a genus of extinct plants
- Huia, New Zealand, a settlement in West Auckland
- Huia River, in the West Coast region of the South Island of New Zealand
- 9488 Huia, a main-belt asteroid
- Huia Publishers, a publishing company
- "Huia", a song by Upper Hutt Posse from Legacy
- Te Huia, a passenger train service in New Zealand

== People with the surname ==
- Maria Te Huia, a former New Zealand soccer player

== People with the given name ==
- Huia Edmonds (born 1981), an Australian rugby union footballer
- Huia Samuels, a fictional character in television series Shortland Street

== See also ==
- Waka huia, treasure containers made by Māori
- Ngāti Huia, a Māori tribe
- Hui (disambiguation)
