= Huizhou (disambiguation) =

Huizhou may refer to:

- Huizhou, city in Guangdong, China
  - Huizhou dialect, the local dialect in Huizhou Guangdong
- Huizhou, Anhui, historical prefecture in Anhui, China
  - Huizhou District, district in Huangshan (former Huizhou), Anhui
  - Huizhou Chinese, a topolect of the Chinese language
