= Hui Chinese =

Hui Chinese may refer to:

- Huizhou Chinese, also called Hui Chinese, one of the ten primary varieties of the Chinese language
- Hui people, Chinese-speaking Muslims
