= Zhang Chi =

Zhang Chi may refer to:

- Zhang Chi (scholar) (1133–1180), Ming Dynasty Confucian scholar
- Zhang Chi (footballer) (born 1987), Chinese football player
- Zhang Chi (badminton) (born 2002), Chinese badminton player
