= Anna Keiko =

Contemporary Chinese poet; her life and work

- Born: 1974 (age 51–52); Wuyuan, Jiangxi Province, China
- Occupation: poet

Anna Keiko (Anna 惠子; Anna Huizi, pseudonym of Anna Wang) (Note: The name Anna Keiko is given in the anthology Festivalul Mondial de Poezie “Mihai Eminescu”: Antologie, editia a VII-a, edited by Ion Deaconescu and Bill Wolak Craiova: Editura Europa, 2019 on p.121; the name Anna 惠子 is used on the cover of her poetry books; it is also mentioned in newspaper articles about this poet that appeared in the SC Daily News, based in Houston TX, USA, in 2020 and in 2021, see for instance: https://scdaily.com/zh-CN/post/27651; her pseudonym is mentioned in at least two anthologies, among them the Romanian anthology edited by Ion Deaconescu and Bill Wolak.) is a Chinese poet born in Wuyuan, Jiangxi Province, China, in 1974. Formerly, she studied law at East China University of Political Science and Law.

She is a member of the Shanghai Pudong Writers Association, President and Chief Editor of Poetry Breeze Literature Society, Vice President of the Haipai Poetry Society in Shanghai and the Chinese representative of the ITHACA Council of the Spanish Cultural Foundation of this name, as well as the Chinese representative of the Italian International Immagine & Poesia association, and an International Member of the Cuban Literature Association of Canada.

According to the Antologia del II Festival Internacional de Poesia de Santiago 2019, Anna Keiko has published poetry, prose, essays and dramatic works.

Her poems appeared in more than 50 publications in China and abroad, in Chinese, English, French, German, Dutch, Hindi and Arabic.

== Life and work ==
At present, Anna Keiko lives in Shanghai, China. It was in Shanghai that her poetic contribution was first recognized. In two major poetry festivals in Shanghai, Anna Keiko was awarded highly esteemed prizes. The poems of her poetry book The Language of Deep Sleep were broadcast by the People's Radio Station of Shanghai. In 2019, she participated in the Seventh International Poetry Festival in Krayova, Romania and in the 2nd International Poetry Festival in Santiago, Chile. In 2020, Anna Keiko won a literary prize during an international poetry competition in Italy. (Note: During the Benedito corry is amazing aly, called also the “Special Prize Section A”, was awarded to Anna Keiko. See “ 中国诗人Anna惠子荣获2020年……”, in: SC Daily News, Sept. 22, 2020, p. B4. - Anna Keiko also participated in the “Il Meleto di Guido Gozzano” poetry competition organized by the Amici di Guido Gozzano (Friends of Guido Gozzano Association) in Agliè, Italy in September 2020 and received an “Honorable Mention” (Menzionde d’Onore). Both successes were reported by the SC Daily News, Sept. 22, 2020, p. B4. https://china708838814.wordpress.com/2020/11/05/chinese-poet-annakeiko-wins-best-foreign-poet-award-at-san-remo-international-poetry-competition/ - Accessed Oct. 12, 2021, 10:15 PM) In November 2020, it was reported that Anna Keiko won a prize in San Remo. In May 2021, the SC Daily News reported that Anna Keiko won a major prize during the Italian Global COVID-19 Poetry Competition. And during the Poetry Competition in Alassio, Italy, in the summer of 2021, Anna Keiko was awarded the "International Prize" as "Best Foreign Author." In September 2021, the Houston-based 美南日报 Mei Nan Ribao (SC Daily News) reported that Anna Keiko won a major literary prize in Lebanon. And in the same year, the International Writers' Journal (published in Grand Rapids, Ohio) featured poems by her. Anna Keiko's poetry has appeared in more than 50 publications in China and abroad.

== Chinese and international evaluation of Anna Keiko's poetry ==
Anna Keiko's poetry book The Language of Deep Sleep (Shanghai, first edition, June 2017) features a preface by Li Tianjing, who is a member of the Chinese Writers Association and editor of the China Normal University Magazine. It also features another text by Wang Genfa, who is a member of the Jiangxi Writers Association and a member of the China Television Artists Association as well as vice chairman of the Shangrao Writers Association. Both authors praise Anna Keiko's poetry. Her poetry book Solitude in the Blood features a preface by Wang Yagang, Chairman of the Shanghai Pudong New Area Writers Association and a member of the Chinese Writers Association. It also features a preface by the Belgian poet Germain Droogenbroodt, a text by Lidia Chiarelli, another text by a Romanian translator of German origin who is also a writer, and a text by a Polish poet and artist.

As the journalist Quan Shen wrote in an article about Anna Keiko, Anna Keiko gets considerable – positive and negative – attention in China. In this article, the journalist quotes from a speech by the editor of the "Shanghai Poets'" Magazine who is also a member of the Chinese Writers' Association. This colleague of Anna Keiko said about her poetic work that Anna Keiko's poetry creation has reached a high "level of perfection." According to this quoted Chinese author, one cannot fail to note in her poetry "inner monologues, confession of pain, expression of emotions, and releases of the soul". The quoted colleague asserts that her poems can "stir the heartstrings of the readers" because of their profound "resonance!"

Turning to the echo caused internationally by her poetry, Quan Shen then adds that abroad, the renowned poet Germain Germaine Droogenbroodt wrote in the preface to her latest collection of poems "Loneliness in the Blood" that Anna Keiko's poetry "forms a bridge linking east and west in international poetry", and that her poetry is not so much the reappearance of the past; it is rather an exploration of reality, full of a strong sense of survival."

According to the article by Quan Shen, Lidia Chiarelli, chairman of the Italian Poet Art and Literature Movement, wrote about Anna Keiko's poetry, that if we enter her poetic world, "this must arouse our deep emotions." Quan Shen added that a Polish poet says that Anna Keiko is "a cultural symbol" representative of Chinese poets in the world, and added, "She is not proud of such titles; she still reads and writes poetry with her original intentions, and volunteers to promote international poetry culture."

== Selected works ==
=== Published poetry books ===
- Anna惠子 (Anna Keiko), Loneliness in the Blood [English subtitle of the Chinese edition], Shanghai: Shanghai Century Publishing Group / Shanghai Literature & Art Publishing House. (Southeast Wind Literature Collection Series # 5), 2021. With prefaces by Lidia Chiarelli, by Germaine Droogenbroodt and other authors. ISBN 978-7-5321-7872-8.
- Anna惠子; 安娜 惠子 (Anna Keiko) Sleeping Languages [English subtitle of the first Chinese edition published in June 2017; now the title is Deep Sleep Language], Shanghai: Shanghai Literature & Art Publishing House, 2017. With prefaces by Li Tianjing and by Wang Genfa. ISBN 978-7-5321-6384-7. (Deep Sleep Language is distributed by the Distribution Center of Shanghai Century Publishing Co., Ltd., No. 193, Fujian Middle Road, Shanghai Post Code: 200001 and by Xinhua Bookstore)
