= Hwiju Yo clan =

Korean clan from Anhui, China

- Country: Korea
- Current region: Huizhou District

Hwiju Yo clan (Korean: 휘주 요씨; Hanja: 徽州 姚氏) was one of the Korean clans. Their Bon-gwan was in Huizhou District, Huangshan City, Anhui, China. According to the research in 1985, the number of Hwiju Yo clan was 274. The name of Hwiju Yo clan came from China. According to the census in 1930, 10 families belonged to Hwiju Yo clan. But it has been found that 6 out of the 10 families living in North Hamgyong Province were descendants of the Ming dynasty and were naturalized to Joseon to avoid conflicts happened more than 290 years before.

== See also ==
- Korean clan names of foreign origin
