= Huy (disambiguation) =

Huy is a municipality in Belgium.

Huy or HUY may also refer to:

== People ==
=== Given name ===
- Huy (Egyptian name) or Hui, an ancient Egyptian name
- Huy of Champasak, King of Champasak 1826–1841
- Huy Du (1926–2006), Vietnamese composer

=== Surname ===
- Bonnie Huy (1935–2013), American politician
- Gerrit Huy (born 1953), German politician
- Wolf-Dietrich Huy (1917–2003), German flying ace

== Places ==
- Arrondissement of Huy, in Belgium
- Huy (hills), in Saxony-Anhalt, Germany
- Huy, Germany, a municipality in Saxony-Anhalt

== Other uses ==
- Hulaulá language, a modern Jewish Aramaic language
- Humberside Airport, in England
- Huyton railway station, in England

== See also ==
- Hui (disambiguation)
