= Zhang Shi =

Zhang Shi or Chang Shih may refer to:

- Zhang Shi, mother of Mencius
- Zhang Shi (prince) (died 320), ruler of the Former Liang state during the Sixteen Kingdoms period
- Zhang Shi (scholar) (1133–1181), Song dynasty scholar
- Chang Shih (actor) (born 1966), Taiwanese actor
