= Whakamoke tarakina =

Conservation status
- Not Threatened (NZ TCS)

Scientific classification
- Domain: Eukaryota
- Kingdom: Animalia
- Phylum: Arthropoda
- Subphylum: Chelicerata
- Class: Arachnida
- Order: Araneae
- Infraorder: Araneomorphae
- Family: Malkaridae
- Genus: Whakamoke
- Species: W. tarakina

Binomial name
- Whakamoke tarakina Hormiga & Scharff, 2020

Species of spider

Whakamoke tarakina is a species of Malkaridae that is endemic to New Zealand.

== Taxonomy ==
This species was described in 2020 by Gustavo Hormiga and Nikolaj Scharff. The holotype is stored in Auckland War Memorial Museum under registration number AMNZ60750.

== Description ==
The male is recorded at 4.25-4.55mm in length whereas the female is 4.79-5.62mm. This species has a dark red brown carapace, red brown legs and a whitish brown abdomen.

== Distribution ==
This species is known from the North Island of New Zealand.

== Conservation status ==
Under the New Zealand Threat Classification System, this species is listed as "Not Threatened".
