= Huizhou Chinese =

Sinitic language

Hui
- 徽語 / 徽语
- Native to: China
- Region: Huizhou, southern Anhui, neighbouring portions of Zhejiang and Jiangxi
- Native speakers: 5.4 million (2021)
- Language family: Sino-Tibetan: Sinitic; Chinese; Hui
- Varieties: Ji–She; Xiu–Yi; Qi–De; Yanzhou; Jing–Zhan

Language codes
- ISO 639-3: czh
- Glottolog: huiz1242
- Linguasphere: 79-AAA-da
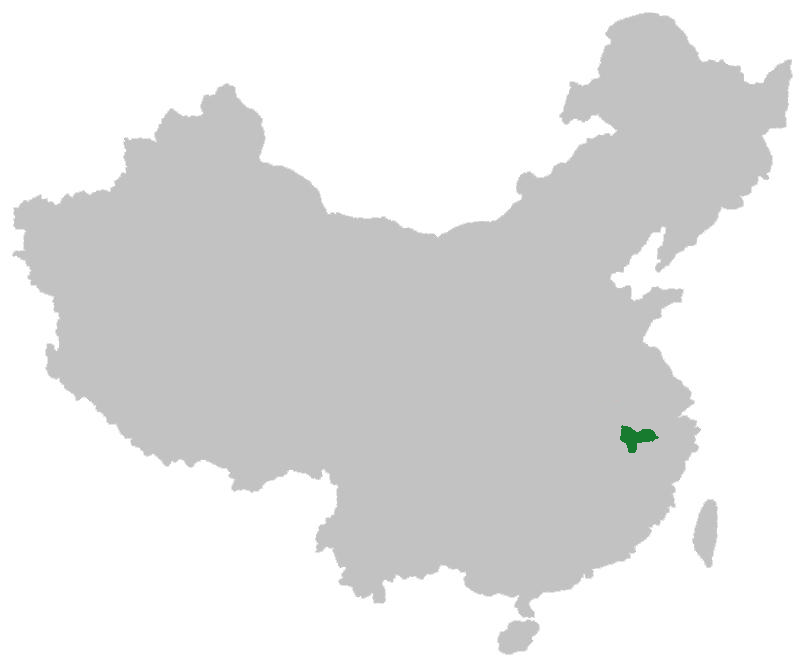

Huizhou Chinese
- Simplified Chinese: 徽州话
- Traditional Chinese: 徽州話
- Hanyu Pinyin: Huīzhōuhuà
Transcriptions
Standard Mandarin
- Hanyu Pinyin: Huīzhōuhuà
- Bopomofo: ㄏㄨㄟ ㄓㄡ ㄏㄨㄚˋ
- Wade–Giles: Hui^{1}-chou^{1}-hua^{4}
- Tongyong Pinyin: Huei-jhou-huà
- IPA: [xwéɪ.ʈʂóʊ.xwâ]
other Mandarin
- Xiao'erjing: ﺧُﻮِﺟِﻮْ ﺧُﻮَ
Yue: Cantonese
- Yale Romanization: Fāijāu Wá
- Jyutping: zau1 waa6
- IPA: [fɐj˥ tsɐw˥ wa˨]

Alternative Chinese name
- Simplified Chinese: 徽语
- Traditional Chinese: 徽語
- Hanyu Pinyin: Huīyǔ
Transcriptions
Standard Mandarin
- Hanyu Pinyin: Huīyǔ
- Bopomofo: ㄏㄨㄟ ㄩˇ
- Wade–Giles: Hui^{1}-yü^{3}
- Tongyong Pinyin: Huei-yǔ
- IPA: [xwéɪ.ỳ]
Yue: Cantonese
- Yale Romanization: Fāiyuh
- Jyutping: fai1 jyu5
- IPA: [fɐj˥ jy˩˧]

Hui Chinese (Chinese: 徽语) is one of the ten primary varieties of the Chinese language spoken in the Hui cultural region (Chinese: 徽文化区), including the historical Huizhou Prefecture in Southern Anhui, and part of the historical Yanzhou Prefecture in Zhejiang and part of Raozhou Prefecture in Jiangxi.

Although the Hui cultural region is small compared to other Chinese dialectal regions, Hui Chinese displays a very high degree of internal variation, and the lect is also situated near many mutually unintelligible varieties, making its classification difficult. It has been previously grouped with Jianghuai Mandarin, Wu, and Gan, and some even believe that it does not even constitute a singular language family.

== Region of use ==
Hui Chinese is the Chinese variety spoken in the Hui cultural region, which not only include the historical Huizhou Prefecture, but also include part of the historical Yanzhou Prefecture and part of the historical Raozhou Prefecture. The relationship between Huizhou Prefecture and Hui cultural region resembles that of Canton Prefecture and Yue cultural region.

- Huizhou Pefecture (historical administrative division)
  - Huangshan City and Jixi County in Anhui Province (nowadays administrative division)
  - Wuyuan County in Jiangxi Province (nowadays administrative division)
- Part of Yanzhou Prefecture (historical administrative division)
  - Jiande County-level City in Zhejiang Province (nowadays administrative division)
- Part of Raozhou Prefecture (historical administrative division)
  - Fuliang County in Jiangxi Province (nowadays administrative division)

== Classification ==
Hui Chinese was originally classified as Lower Yangtze Mandarin but it is currently classified separately from it. The Chinese Academy of Social Sciences supported the separation of Huizhou from Lower Yangtze Mandarin in 1987. Its classification is disputed, with some linguists, such as Matisoff classifying it as Wu Chinese, others such as Bradley (2007) as Gan, and still others setting it apart as a primary branch of Chinese.

A reconstruction of Common Huizhou by Coblin has found that the lect group is likely areal, not a "genetically related" group of varieties, and is merely a useful category to collect these hard-to-classify varieties. He notes that they do not belong to any other top-level group due to the lack of shared innovations with any, and that they do not have any shared innovations among themselves. He also notes that the above conclusion would imply that his reconstruction is not a proto-system, but instead an "analytical device or template".

== History ==
During the Ming and Qing dynasties, Jianghuai speakers moved into Hui dialect areas.

Some works of literature produced in Yangzhou, such as Qingfengzha, a novel, contain Jianghuai Mandarin. People in Yangzhou identified by the dialect they speak, locals spoke the dialect, as opposed to sojourners, who spoke other varieties like Huizhou or Wu. This led to the formation of identity based on one's dialect. Large numbers of merchants from Huizhou lived in Yangzhou and effectively were responsible for keeping the town afloat. Merchants in the later imperial period also sponsored operas and performances in the Hui dialect.

== Languages and dialects ==
Zhengzhang Shangfang divided the Hui languages into five subgroups, which are also used in the Language Atlas of China:

Ji–She (績歙)
spoken in Jixi, She County, Huizhou, Jingde (Hongchuan area in the west), and Ningguo (Hongmen area in the south), Anhui province, as well as Chun'an (Tangcun in the west, etc.), Zhejiang province.
carries notable Wu influence. Jixihua is the main Ji-She variety.
Xiu–Yi (休黟)
spoken in Tunxi, Taiping (Guocun in the southwest), Xiuning, Yi County, and Qimen (around Fufeng in the southeast), as well as Wuyuan, Jiangxi province.
Tunxihua is the main Xiu-Yi variety.
Qi–De (祁德)
spoken in Qimen and Dongzhi (partially), Anhui province, as well as Fuliang, Dexing, and Wuyuan, Jiangxi province.
greatly influenced by the surrounding Gan languages.
Yanzhou (嚴州)
spoken in Chun'an and Jiande (formerly Yanzhou Prefecture), Zhejiang province.
heavily influenced by Wu.
Jing–Zhan (旌占)
spoken in Jingde, Qimen (in and around Anling, Chengan, and Chiling), Shitai (Zhanda area), Yi County (Meixi, Kecun, and other northern towns), and Ningguo, Anhui province.
forms a thin corridor along the northern edge of the Hui group, carrying influence from Xuanzhou Wu.

Huizhou varieties differ from township to township. People in different townships, towns, etc. (even in one county) often cannot speak with one another.

== Features ==
Phonologically speaking, Hui is noted for its massive loss of syllable codas, including -i, -u, and nasals:

Character	Meaning	Hui of Tunxi	Wu of Shanghai	Huai (Jianghuai) of Hefei	Standard Mandarin
燒	burn	/ɕiɔ/	/sɔ/	/ʂɔ/	/ʂɑu/
柴	firewood	/sa/	/za/	/tʂʰɛ/	/tʂʰai/
綫	line	/siːɛ/	/ɕi/	/ɕĩ/	/ɕiɛn/
張	sheet	/tɕiau/	/tsɑ̃/	/tʂɑ̃/	/tʂɑŋ/
網	web	/mau/	/mɑ̃/	/wɑ̃/	/wɑŋ/
檻	threshold	/kʰɔ/	/kʰɛ/	/kʰã/	/kʰan/

Many Hui dialects have diphthongs with a higher lengthened first part. For example, 話 ("speech") is /uːɜ/ in Xiuning County (Standard Chinese /xuɑ/), 園 ("yard") is /yːɛ/ in Xiuning County (Standard Chinese /yɛn/); 結 ("knot") is /tɕiːaʔ/ in Yi County (Standard Chinese /tɕiɛ/), 約 ("agreement") is /iːuʔ/ in Yi County (Standard Chinese /yɛ/). A few areas take this to extremes. For example, Likou in Qimen County has /fũːmɛ̃/ for 飯 ("rice") (Standard Chinese /fan/), with the /m/ appearing directly as a result of the lengthened, nasalized /ũː/.

Because nasal codas have mostly been lost, Hui reuses the 儿 /-r/ ending as a diminutive. For example, in the Tunxi dialect, 索 "rope" appears as /soːn/ from /soʔ/ + /-r/.
