= Waka huia =

Treasure container made by the Maori people of New Zealand

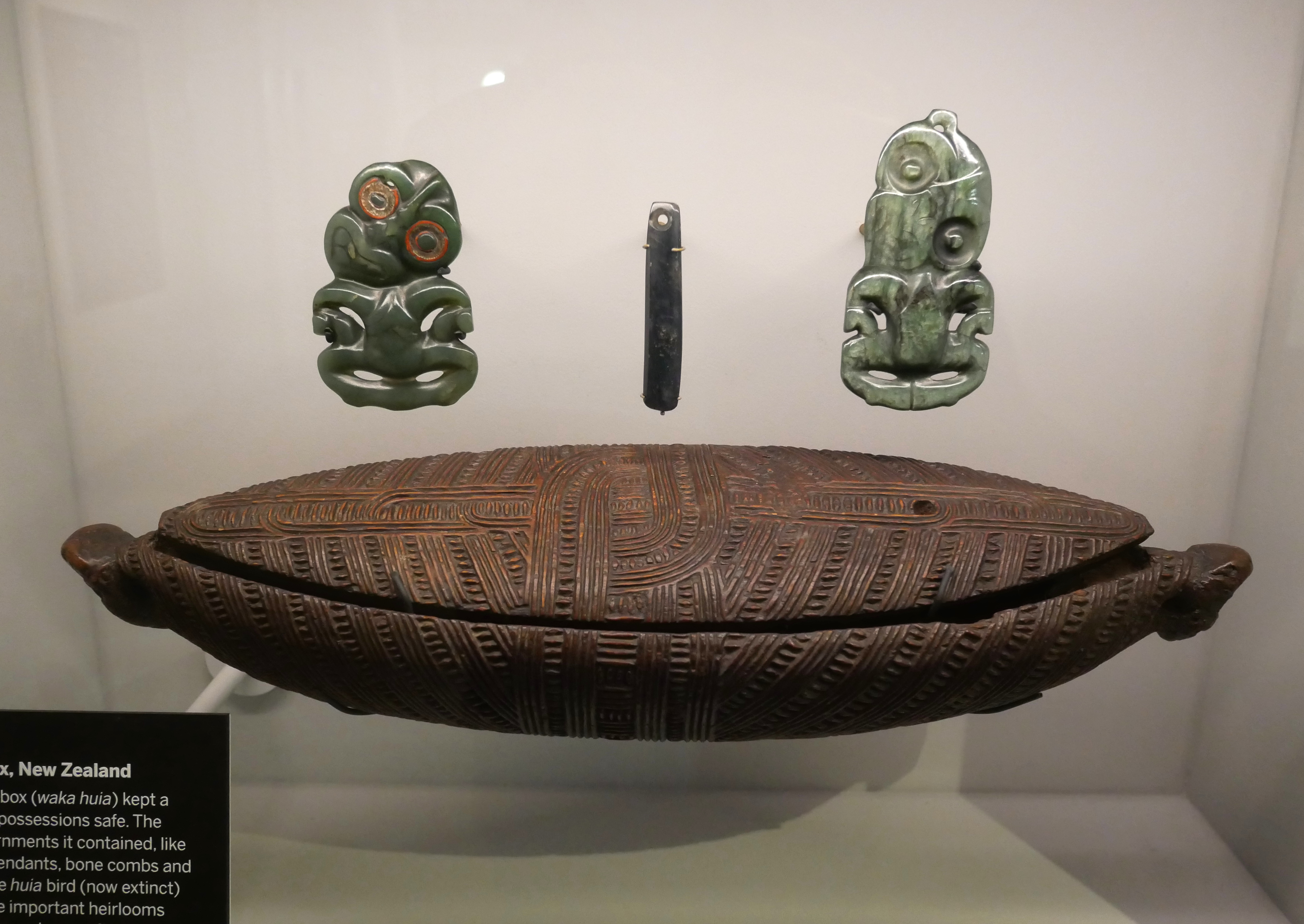
Waka huia on display alongside pendants at the Horniman Museum, London

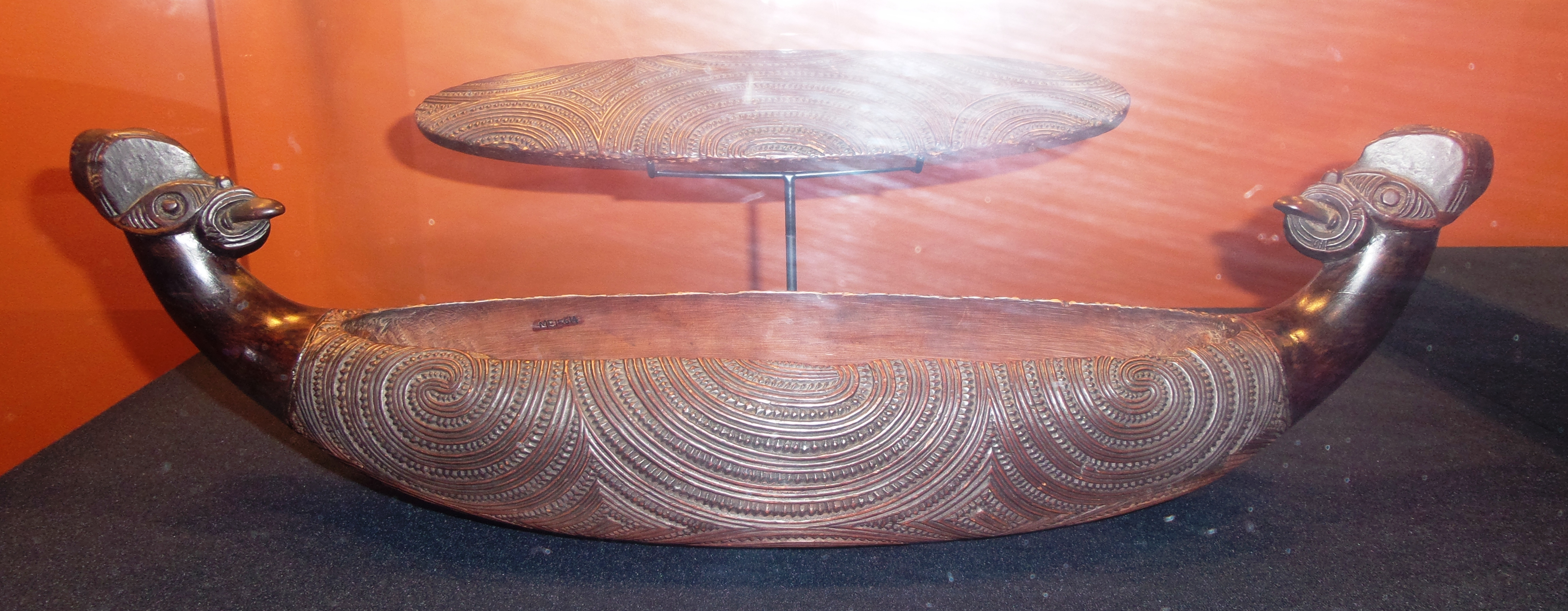
A waka huia in Te Papa, Museum of New Zealand

Waka huia and papa hou are treasure containers made by Māori – the indigenous people of New Zealand. Waka Huia was also the name of a long-running TV series on TVNZ.

== Containers ==
These containers stored a person's most prized personal possessions, such as hei-tiki (pendants), feathers for decorating and dressing the hair such as the tail feathers of the huia (Heteralocha acutirostris), heru (hair comb) and other items of personal adornment. Waka huia and papa hou were imbued with the tapu (taboo) of their owners because the boxes contained personal items that regularly came into contact with the body, particularly the head (the most tapu part of the body).

Waka huia and papa hou were designed to be suspended from the low hanging ceiling of Māori whare (houses) where their beautifully carved and decorated undersides could be appreciated. They were highly prized in themselves and carefully treasured as they passed between generations. As taonga (treasures), waka huia and papa hou were often gifted between hapū (sub-tribes), whānau (families), and individuals to acknowledge relationships, friendships, and other significant social events. It is common to find waka huia and papa hou of one carving style among a tribe who practice a different style. Te Arawa carvings from early 1800s often depicted embracing figures, something not seen outside of the Bay of Plenty.

Waka huia have an elongated oval shape, similar to the shape of a waka, while papa hou (lit. "feather box") is a variation which is a flat, rectangular box. The rectangular form of papa hou is a northern variation of the more widespread waka huia. Papa hou are not carved on the bottom, whereas waka huia are. A third traditional form, which did not have a consistent name, was listed as powaka whakairo (lit. "carved box") by collector Joel Samuel Polack in the 1830s. These boxes were much taller and squarer than papa hou, and were found across the country in the 1830s.

All three forms of box declined in use over the 19th century. When American Captain Charles Wilkes visited New Zealand in 1845, he noted that whaka huia and papa hou had been mostly replaced by Western style lockable seaman's chests. Only waka huia were still being produced by the 1890s. By this time, waka huia had begun to be carved with legs, so that the boxes could be placed on Western-style tables or mantelpieces instead of the traditional method of being suspended from the ceiling. Approximately 420 waka huia and papa hou are found in museum collections globally, as well as 20 examples of powaka whakairo.

== Other uses of the term ==
=== TV program ===
The term "waka huia" is also occasionally used figuratively, as in the TVNZ television programme Waka Huia. This is a long-running TV series (since 1987) aiming to record and preserve Māori culture and customs as well as covering social and political concerns, presented completely in te reo Māori (language).

=== Film ===
A 2019 short animated film called Waka Huia written by Philippe Carreau and Leprince Laurent was screened at the Point International Film Festival and was nominated for an award. "An old man of Maori origin crosses the world between dream and reality in the footsteps of his grandfather killed in Belgium during the First World War."

=== Church use ===
The term is also used in New Zealand churches for the pyx, a container housing the reserved sacrament.

== See also ==
- Māori culture
