= Whakamoke hunahuna =

Conservation status
- Data Deficient (NZ TCS)

Scientific classification
- Domain: Eukaryota
- Kingdom: Animalia
- Phylum: Arthropoda
- Subphylum: Chelicerata
- Class: Arachnida
- Order: Araneae
- Infraorder: Araneomorphae
- Family: Malkaridae
- Genus: Whakamoke
- Species: W. hunahuna

Binomial name
- Whakamoke hunahuna Hormiga & Scharff, 2020

Species of spider

Whakamoke hunahuna is a species of Malkaridae that is endemic to New Zealand.

== Taxonomy ==
This species was described in 2020 by Gustavo Hormiga and Nikolaj Scharff. The holotype is stored in Otago Museum.

== Description ==
The male is recorded at 3.17mm in length. This species has a red brown carapace, yellow brown legs and a whitish brown abdomen.

== Distribution ==
This species is only known from near Dunedin in New Zealand.

== Conservation status ==
Under the New Zealand Threat Classification System, this species is listed as "Data Deficient".
