= Whakamoke guacamole =

Conservation status
- Not Threatened (NZ TCS)

Scientific classification
- Kingdom: Animalia
- Phylum: Arthropoda
- Subphylum: Chelicerata
- Class: Arachnida
- Order: Araneae
- Infraorder: Araneomorphae
- Family: Malkaridae
- Genus: Whakamoke
- Species: W. guacamole

Binomial name
- Whakamoke guacamole Hormiga & Scharff, 2020

Species of spider

Whakamoke guacamole is a species of spider from the family Malkaridae that is endemic to New Zealand.

== Taxonomy ==
This species was described in 2020 by Gustavo Hormiga and Nikolaj Scharff. The holotype is stored in Auckland Museum under registration number AMNZ66140.

== Description ==
The male is recorded at 3.06mm in length whereas the female 3.06-4.15mm. This species has a red brown carapace, yellow brown legs and a whitish brown abdomen.

== Distribution ==
This species is known from the North Island of New Zealand.

== Conservation status ==
Under the New Zealand Threat Classification System, this species is listed as "Not Threatened".
