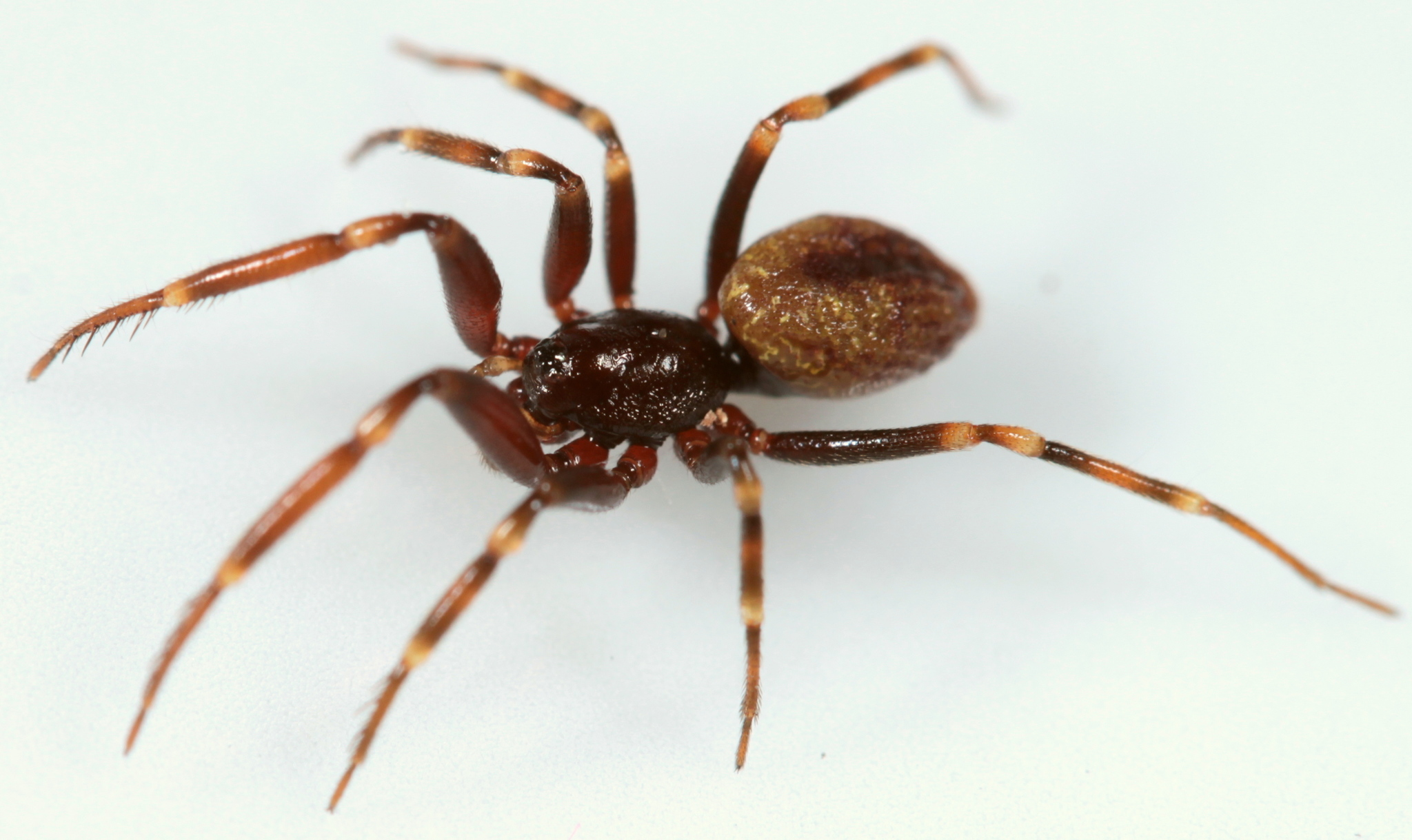

Conservation status
- Relict (NZ TCS)

Scientific classification
- Domain: Eukaryota
- Kingdom: Animalia
- Phylum: Arthropoda
- Subphylum: Chelicerata
- Class: Arachnida
- Order: Araneae
- Infraorder: Araneomorphae
- Family: Malkaridae
- Genus: Whakamoke
- Species: W. paoka

Binomial name
- Whakamoke paoka Hormiga & Scharff, 2020

= Whakamoke paoka =

Species of spider

Whakamoke paoka is a species of Malkaridae that is endemic to New Zealand.

== Taxonomy ==
This species was described in 2020 by Gustavo Hormiga and Nikolaj Scharff. The holotype is stored in Otago Museum.

== Description ==
The male is recorded at 3.77-4.18mm in length whereas the female is 4.16-5.30mm. This species has a dark red brown carapace, red brown legs and a whitish brown abdomen.

== Distribution ==
This species is only known from Canterbury, New Zealand.

== Conservation status ==
Under the New Zealand Threat Classification System, this species is listed as "Relict" with the qualifier "Data Poor: Size".
