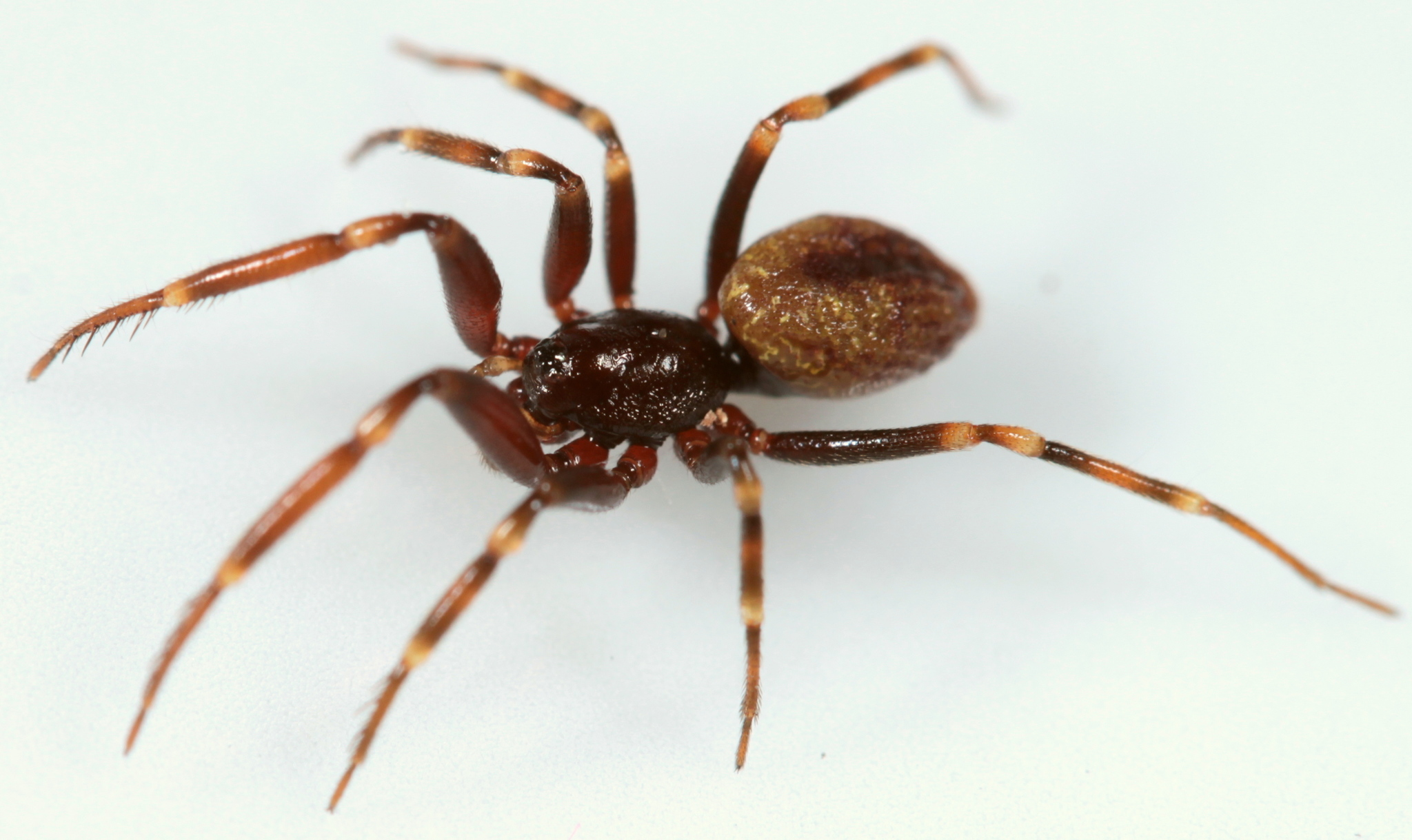
- Whakamoke paoka

Scientific classification
- Kingdom: Animalia
- Phylum: Arthropoda
- Subphylum: Chelicerata
- Class: Arachnida
- Order: Araneae
- Infraorder: Araneomorphae
- Family: Malkaridae
- Genus: Whakamoke; Hormiga & Scharff, 2020

Type species
- W. orongorongo Hormiga & Scharff, 2020

Species
- 7, see text

= Whakamoke =

Genus of spiders

Whakamoke is a genus of Polynesian shield spiders. It was first described by Gustavo Hormiga and N. Scharff in 2020, and it has only been found in New Zealand.

== Species ==
As of January 2022 it contains seven species:

- W. guacamole Hormiga & Scharff, 2020 – New Zealand
- W. heru Hormiga & Scharff, 2020 – New Zealand
- W. hunahuna Hormiga & Scharff, 2020 – New Zealand
- W. orongorongo Hormiga & Scharff, 2020 (type) – New Zealand
- W. paoka Hormiga & Scharff, 2020 – New Zealand
- W. rakiura Hormiga & Scharff, 2020 – New Zealand
- W. tarakina Hormiga & Scharff, 2020 – New Zealand
