= Likou =

Coordinates: 29.8948°N 117.512°E

Likou 历口镇
- Town

Chinese transcription(s)
  - Chinese: 历口镇
  - Pinyin: Lìkǒu Zhèn
- Interactive map of Likou
- Country: China
- Province: Anhui
- Prefecture: Huangshan
- County: Qimen

Population (2010)
  - Total: 11,088
- Time zone: UTC+8 (China Standard Time)

Likou is a township-level division situated in Qimen County, Huangshan City, Anhui, China.

== History ==
On the evening of December 6, 2011, Mr. Jiang, Head of the Forest Section of the Qimen County Police Office, hit a four-year-old boy (Jiajia, son of Wang Ronghua 汪荣华) with his car while driving through Shendu Village. The boy died at the scene and the boy's grandfather committed suicide by ingesting pesticide. Mr. Jiang was suspended from office.

== Administrative Divisions ==
Thirteen villages:

- Shiqi (石碛村), Wuling (武陵村), Guanghui (光辉村), Xu (许村), Xitang (西塘村), Zhengchong (正冲村), Shendu (深都村), Xiangdong (湘东村), Lixi (历溪村), Penglong (彭龙村), Huansha (环砂村), Fuling (甫岭村), Yechen (叶陈村)

Former villages:

- Fanjia (范家村), Ye (叶村), Chentian (陈田村)

== See also ==
- List of township-level divisions of Anhui
