= Whakamoke orongorongo =

Conservation status
- Not Threatened (NZ TCS)

Scientific classification
- Domain: Eukaryota
- Kingdom: Animalia
- Phylum: Arthropoda
- Subphylum: Chelicerata
- Class: Arachnida
- Order: Araneae
- Infraorder: Araneomorphae
- Family: Malkaridae
- Genus: Whakamoke
- Species: W. orongorongo

Binomial name
- Whakamoke orongorongo Hormiga & Scharff, 2020

Species of spider

Whakamoke orongorongo is a species of Malkaridae that is endemic to New Zealand.

== Taxonomy ==
This species was described in 2020 by Gustavo Hormiga and Nikolaj Scharff. The holotype is stored in Te Papa Museum.

== Description ==
The male is recorded at 4.87-5.15mm in length whereas the female is 5.86-6.02mm. This species has a dark red brown carapace, red brown legs and a whitish brown abdomen.

== Distribution ==
Only known from the Wellington region of New Zealand.

== Conservation status ==
Under the New Zealand Threat Classification System, this species is listed as "Not Threatened".
