= Mu Prefecture =

Former administrative division in Zhejiang, China

Muzhou or Mu Prefecture (睦州) was a zhou (prefecture) in imperial China centering on modern Jiande, Zhejiang, China. It existed (intermittently) from 603 to 1121, when its name changed to Yanzhou (and eventually to Yanzhou Prefecture in the Ming dynasty).

== Geography ==
The administrative region of Muzhou in the Tang dynasty falls within modern Jiande in western Zhejiang. It probably includes modern:

- Jiande
- Tonglu County
- Chun'an County

== See also ==
- Yanzhou Prefecture
