= Zhang Shi (scholar) =

Song Dynasty scholar and government official (1133–1181)

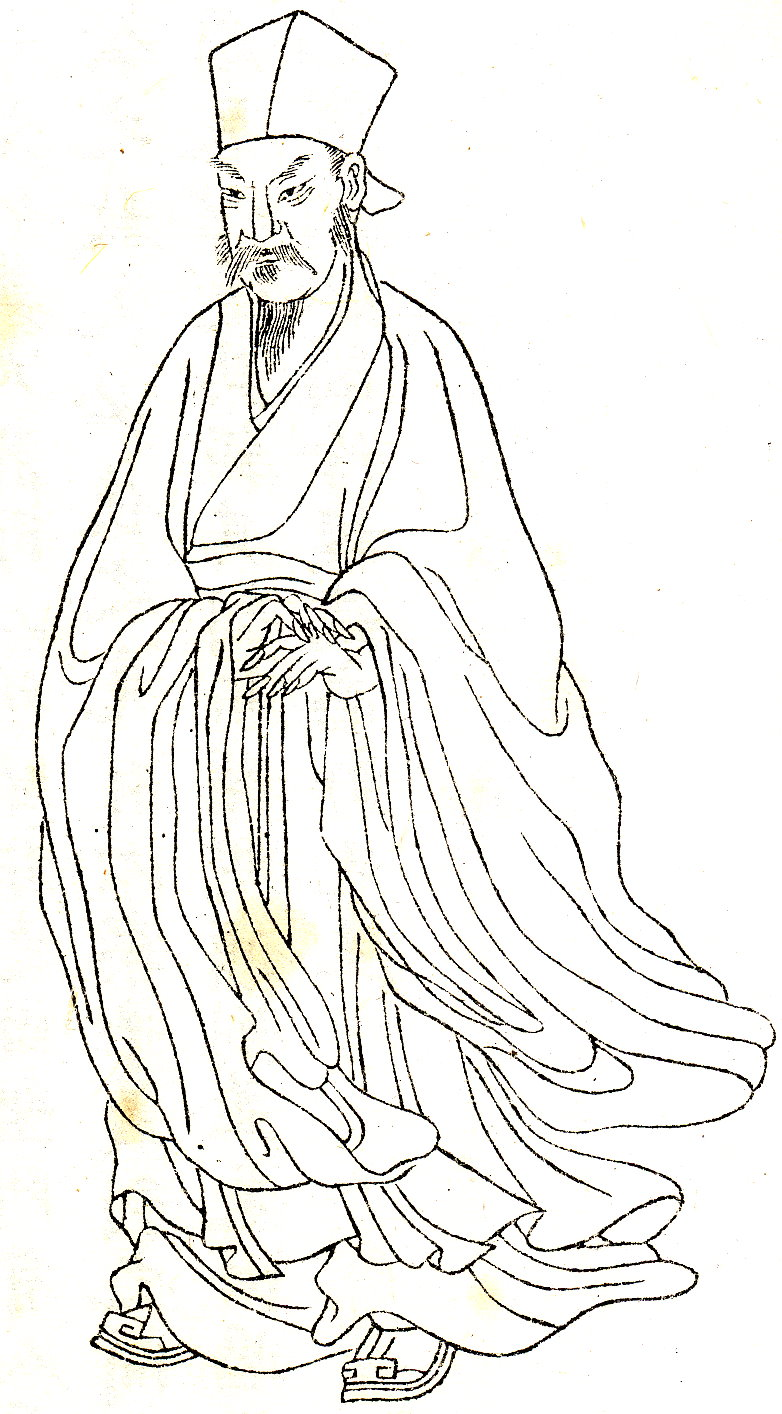

Personal Name
- Traditional Chinese: 張栻
- Simplified Chinese: 张栻
Transcriptions
Standard Mandarin
- Hanyu Pinyin: Zhāng Shì
- Wade–Giles: Chang Shih

Courtesy Names
- Traditional Chinese: 張敬夫 張欽夫 張樂齋
- Simplified Chinese: 张敬夫 张钦夫 张乐斋
Transcriptions
Standard Mandarin
- Hanyu Pinyin: Zhāng Jìngfū; Zhāng Qīnfū; Zhāng Lèzhāi
- Wade–Giles: Chang Ching-fu; Chang Ch'in-fu; Chang Le-chai

Literary Pseudonym
- Traditional Chinese: 南軒先生
- Simplified Chinese: 南轩先生
- Literal meaning: Mr. Nanxuan; Gentleman of the Southern Axis
Transcriptions
Standard Mandarin
- Hanyu Pinyin: Nānxuān xiānshēng
- Wade–Giles: Nan-hsüan Hsien-sheng

Temple Name
- Traditional Chinese: 張文宣公
- Simplified Chinese: 张文宣公
Transcriptions
Standard Mandarin
- Hanyu Pinyin: Zhāng Wénxuāngōng
- Wade–Giles: Chang Wen-hsüan-kung

Zhang Shi (1133–1181), also known by numerous courtesy names and various romanizations, was a scholar during the Song Dynasty in China and key figure in Neo-Confucianism.

== Biography ==
He was a native of Mianzhu (綿竹), Sichuan, and the son of a distinguished general and statesman named Zhang Jun (1097–1164), who held the title of Duke of Yi (益公).

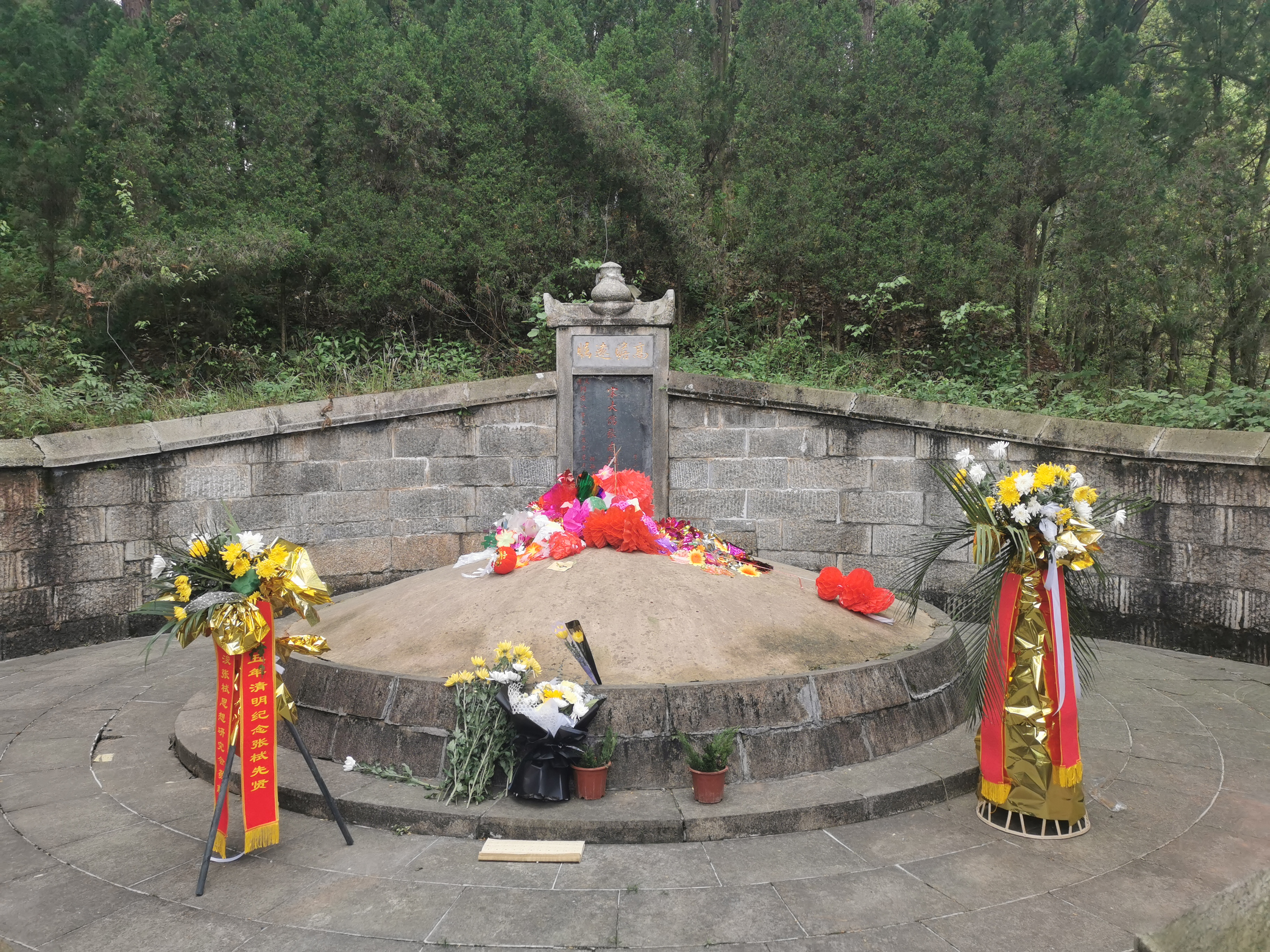
Zhang Shi's tomb in Guanshan, Xiangzikou, Ningxiang city, Hunan

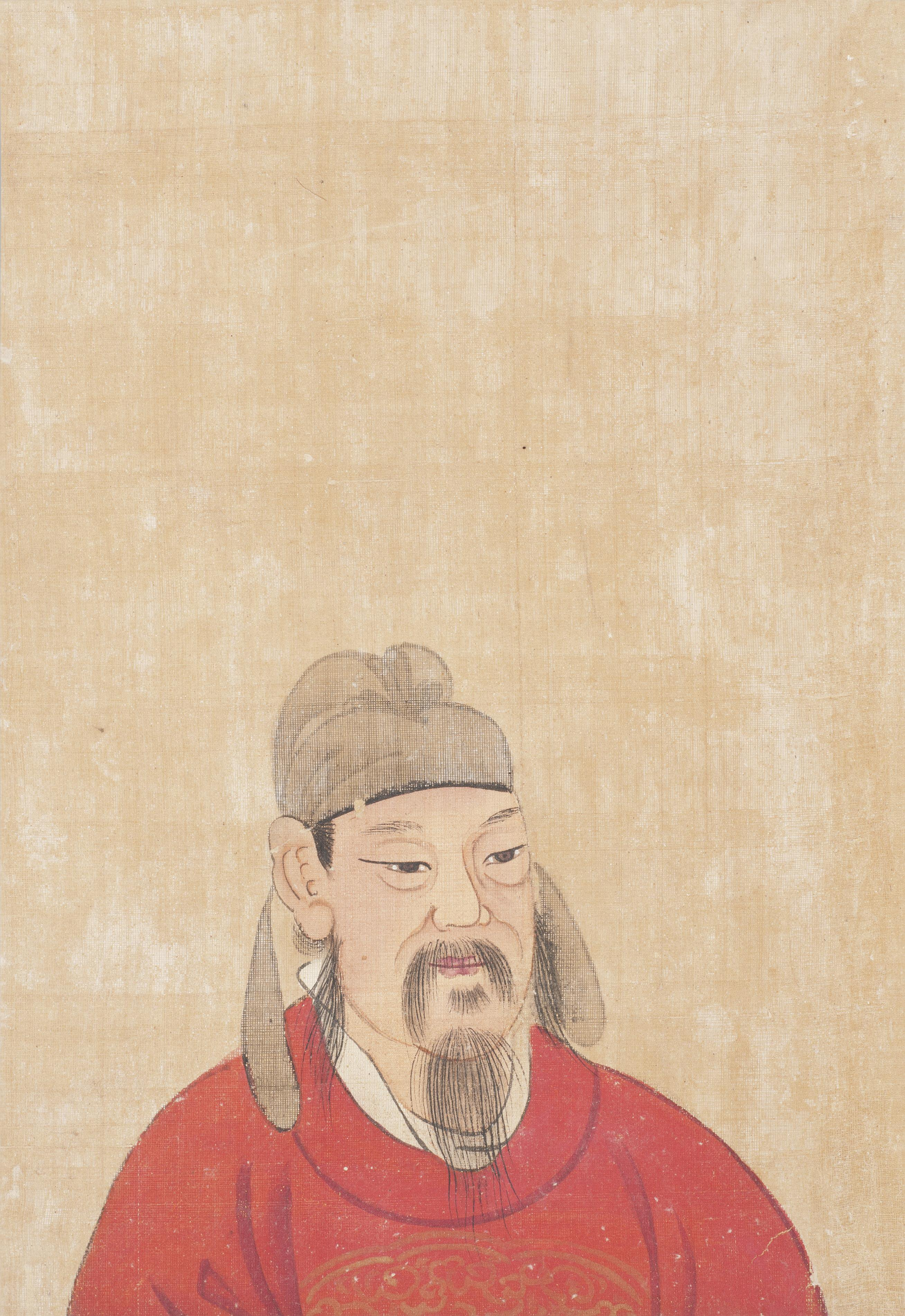
As depicted in Portraits of Famous Men, housed in the Philadelphia Museum of Art

After studying under Hu Hong, son of Hu Anguo, Zhang Shi commenced an official career and became aide-de-camp and secretary to his father. He held various posts, including prefect of Yanzhou, Yuanzhou, Jingjiang, and Jiangling, eventually becoming senior compiler in the Youwen Hall (右文殿). In 1164 his father died, and Zhang Shi buried him according to his wish at the foot of Mount Heng in Hunan, remaining in seclusion near the grave for several years. While there he was visited in 1167 by Zhu Xi, and it is said that they spent three days and three nights arguing about the Doctrine of the Mean. The result was that Zhang returned to official life, and became a strong opponent of the Jurchen Jin and of the policy of conciliation and concession which had been introduced by Qin Gui. He was alternately promoted and demoted until he died while governor of Zhingzhou in Hubei. He was the author of many treatises and commentaries covering portions of the Confucian Canon, in which he gave expression to doctrines which his friend, Zhu Xi, felt himself called upon to refute. Nevertheless, Zhu Xi held Zhang Shi in high esteem and always spoke of him with admiration. Admitted to the honors at China's Confucian temples in 1261, he was granted the posthumous name Wenxuangong.

== Philosophy ==
Zhang once argued with Zhu Xi about the nature of human goodness, stating some people had not fully shown their kind nature while others had. To perfect one's character, he believed one must study and nurture it within. Zhang also sought to unite ancient Confucian ideas of righteousness and profit, and the Neo-Confucian views of heavenly principles and human desires, suggesting they are part of the same worldview.

== Works ==
Here are some of Zhang Shi's significant writings:

- Lunyu jie (論語解)
- Mengzi shuo (孟子說)
- Yishuo (易說)
- Nanxuan wenji (南軒文集), collected writings
