= Wuyuan County, Jiangxi =

Wuyuan 婺源县
- County
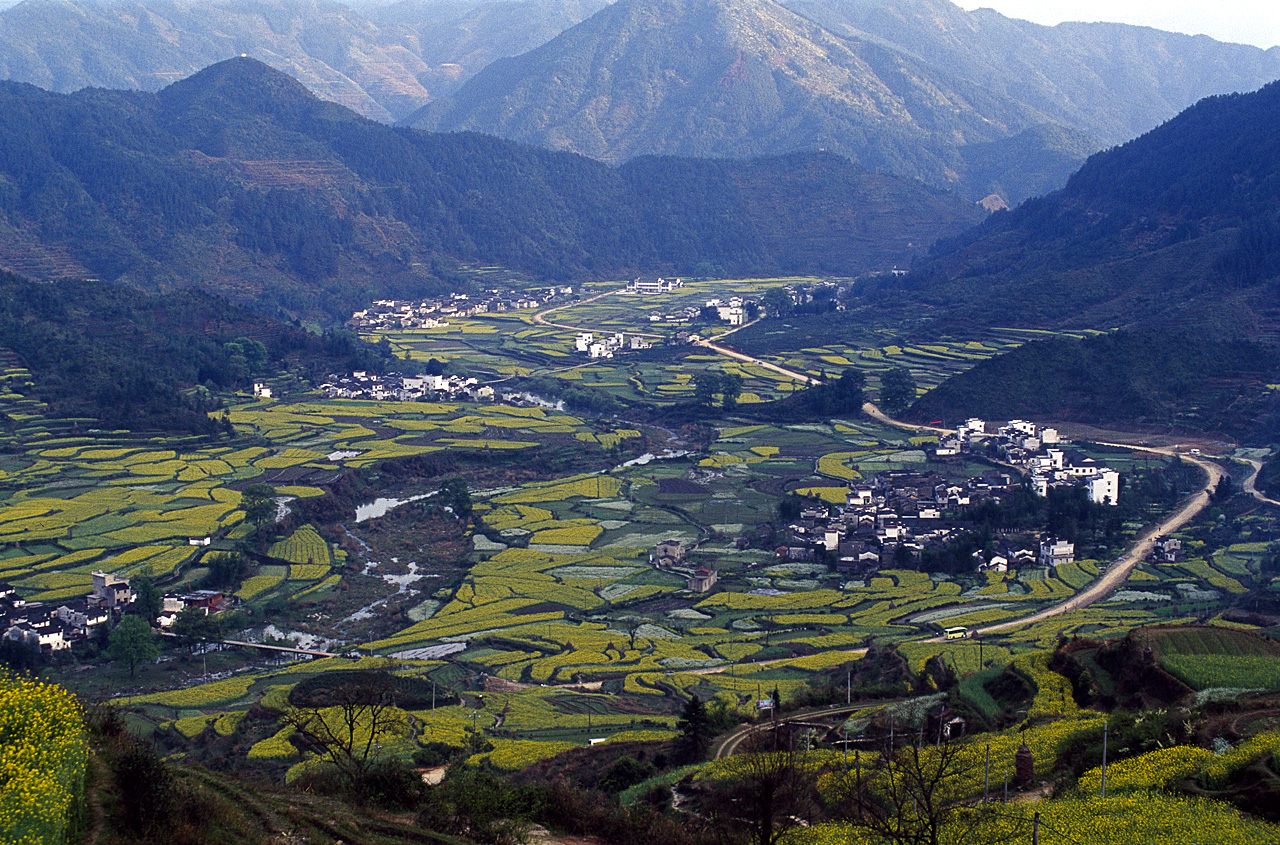
- Jiangling, Wuyuan

- Location in Jiangxi

- Location within China
- Coordinates: 29°14′53″N 117°51′43″E
- Country: People's Republic of China
- Province: Jiangxi
- Prefecture-level city: Shangrao

Area
  - Total: 2,967 km^{2} (1,146 sq mi)

Population (2019)
  - Total: 346,200
  - Density: 116.7/km^{2} (302.2/sq mi)
- Time zone: UTC+8 (China Standard)
- Postal Code: 333200

Wuyuan (simplified Chinese: 婺源县; traditional Chinese: 婺源縣; pinyin: Wùyuán Xiàn) is a county in northeastern Jiangxi province, People's Republic of China, bordering the provinces of Zhejiang to the east and Anhui to the north. It is under the jurisdiction of the prefecture-level city of Shangrao.

Wuyuan, on the boundary of three provinces in Jiangxi's northeastern corner, has a landscape dotted with strange caves, deep secluded rocks and numerous historic sites. Wuyuan County is home to some of the best-preserved ancient architectures in China. Wuyuan's structures were built in 740 during the Tang Dynasty. Its remoteness and inconvenient transportation protect its villages from too many visitors.

It was a county under Huizhou, Anhui province until 1989.

== Administrative divisions ==
At present, Wuyuan County has 1 subdistrict, 10 towns and 6 townships.

1 subdistrict

- Rancheng (蚺城街道)

10 towns

- Ziyang (紫阳镇)
- Qinghua (清华镇)
- Qiukou (秋口镇)
- Jiangwan (江湾镇)
- Sikou (思口镇)
- Fuchun (赋春镇)
- Zhentou (镇头镇)
- Taibai (太白镇)
- Zhongyun (中云镇)
- Xucun (许村镇)

6 townships

- Xitou (溪头乡)
- Duanxin (段莘乡)
- Zheyuan (浙源乡)
- Tuochuan (沱川乡)
- Dazhangshan (大鄣山乡)
- Zhenzhushan (珍珠山乡)

== Demographics ==
The population of the district was 334,020 in 2010.

== Culture ==
The dialect of Wuyuan county is of the Hui dialects, and its culture closely resembles that of Huizhou in southern Anhui.

== Economy ==
GDP of Wuyuan
year	GDP
2001	11.37
2002	13.23
2003	15.73
2004	18.85
2005	23.11
2006	27.86
2007	31.81
2008	36.46
2009	41.50
2010	47.71
2011	56.22
unit: 100 million yuan (RMB)

The GDP of Wuyuan in 2011 is 5.622 billion yuan (RMB).

== Transportation ==
- Railway: Hefei–Fuzhou High-Speed Railway
- Highway: G56 Hangzhou–Ruili Expressway, S22 Dexing–Wuyuan Expressway

== Climate ==
Climate data for Wuyuan, elevation 171 m (561 ft), (1991–2020 normals, extremes 1981–2010)
Month	Jan	Feb	Mar	Apr	May	Jun	Jul	Aug	Sep	Oct	Nov	Dec	Year
Record high °C (°F)	25.4 (77.7)	29.1 (84.4)	35.6 (96.1)	34.3 (93.7)	35.7 (96.3)	37.5 (99.5)	39.6 (103.3)	40.1 (104.2)	38.8 (101.8)	37.9 (100.2)	32.6 (90.7)	25.4 (77.7)	40.1 (104.2)
Mean daily maximum °C (°F)	10.9 (51.6)	13.7 (56.7)	17.6 (63.7)	23.6 (74.5)	27.9 (82.2)	29.9 (85.8)	33.8 (92.8)	33.9 (93.0)	30.6 (87.1)	25.7 (78.3)	19.8 (67.6)	13.6 (56.5)	23.4 (74.1)
Daily mean °C (°F)	5.6 (42.1)	8.1 (46.6)	11.8 (53.2)	17.4 (63.3)	22.0 (71.6)	25.0 (77.0)	28.2 (82.8)	28.0 (82.4)	24.4 (75.9)	18.9 (66.0)	13.0 (55.4)	7.3 (45.1)	17.5 (63.5)
Mean daily minimum °C (°F)	2.2 (36.0)	4.3 (39.7)	7.8 (46.0)	13.1 (55.6)	17.7 (63.9)	21.5 (70.7)	24.1 (75.4)	23.9 (75.0)	20.2 (68.4)	14.4 (57.9)	8.5 (47.3)	3.2 (37.8)	13.4 (56.1)
Record low °C (°F)	−7.9 (17.8)	−6.6 (20.1)	−5.9 (21.4)	0.7 (33.3)	9.3 (48.7)	12.0 (53.6)	18.6 (65.5)	17.3 (63.1)	10.4 (50.7)	0.7 (33.3)	−4.6 (23.7)	−9.1 (15.6)	−9.1 (15.6)
Average precipitation mm (inches)	101.9 (4.01)	123.7 (4.87)	206.7 (8.14)	246.0 (9.69)	262.7 (10.34)	404.7 (15.93)	251.6 (9.91)	138.9 (5.47)	76.5 (3.01)	56.4 (2.22)	81.3 (3.20)	69.8 (2.75)	2,020.2 (79.54)
Average precipitation days (≥ 0.1 mm)	14.5	14.3	17.9	16.4	16.3	18.0	11.9	13.5	8.8	7.2	9.9	10.8	159.5
Average snowy days	2.3	1.5	0.4	0	0	0	0	0	0	0	0.1	0.9	5.2
Average relative humidity (%)	81	80	81	79	80	85	81	80	78	77	80	79	80
Mean monthly sunshine hours	88.8	90.0	98.9	119.5	143.4	120.3	208.7	206.0	177.6	164.6	133.0	122.2	1,673
Percentage possible sunshine	27	28	27	31	34	29	49	51	48	47	42	38	38
Source: China Meteorological Administration

== Scenic sites ==
- Wuyuan Huangling Tourism Resort

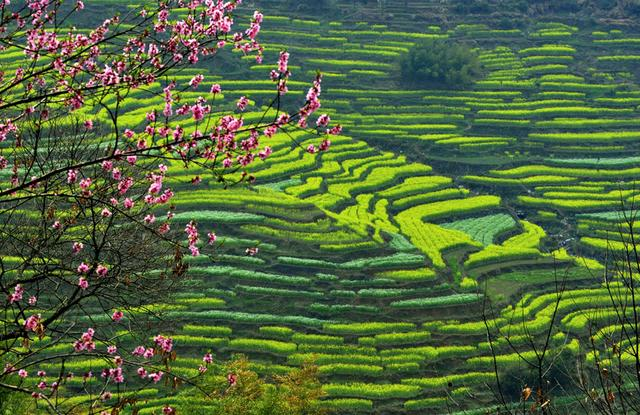
Wuyuan Huangling Tourism Resort

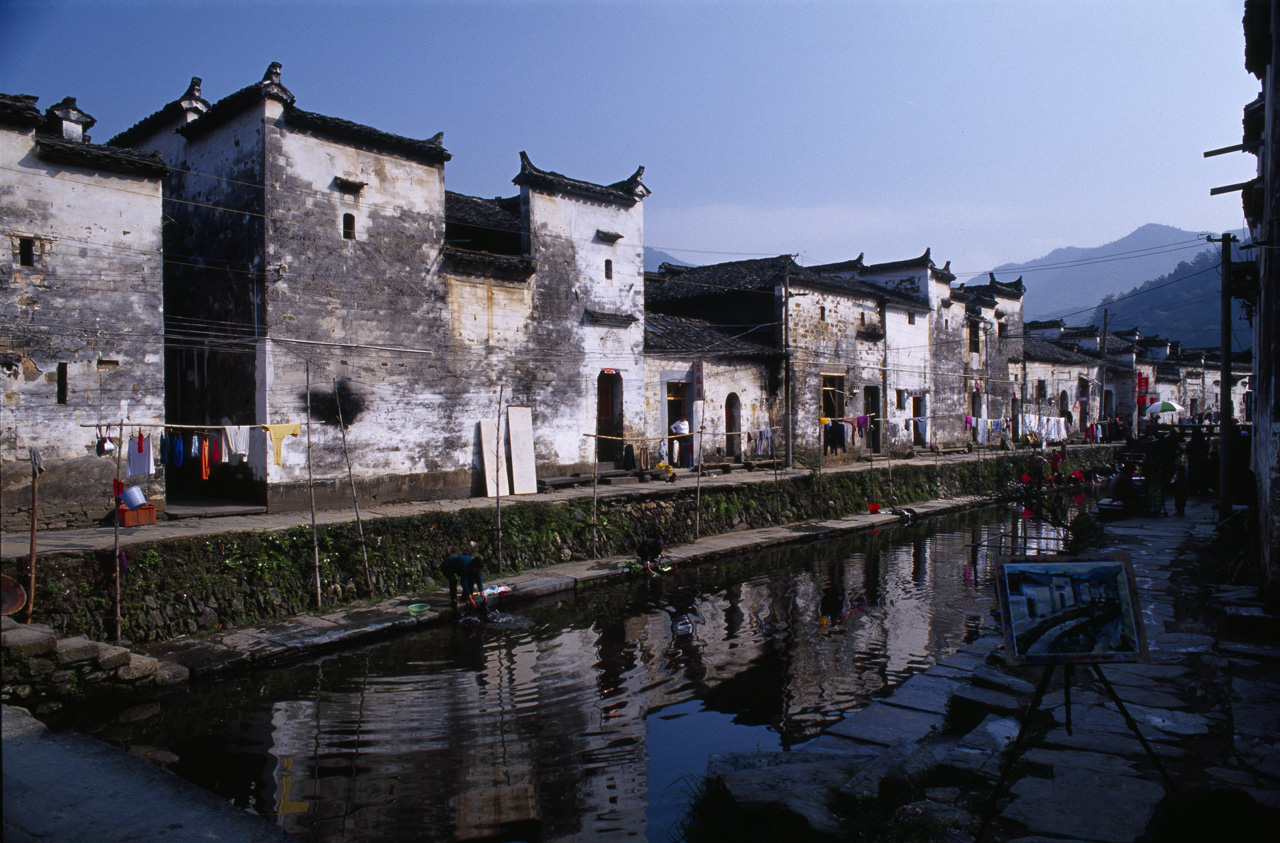
Likeng, Tuochuan

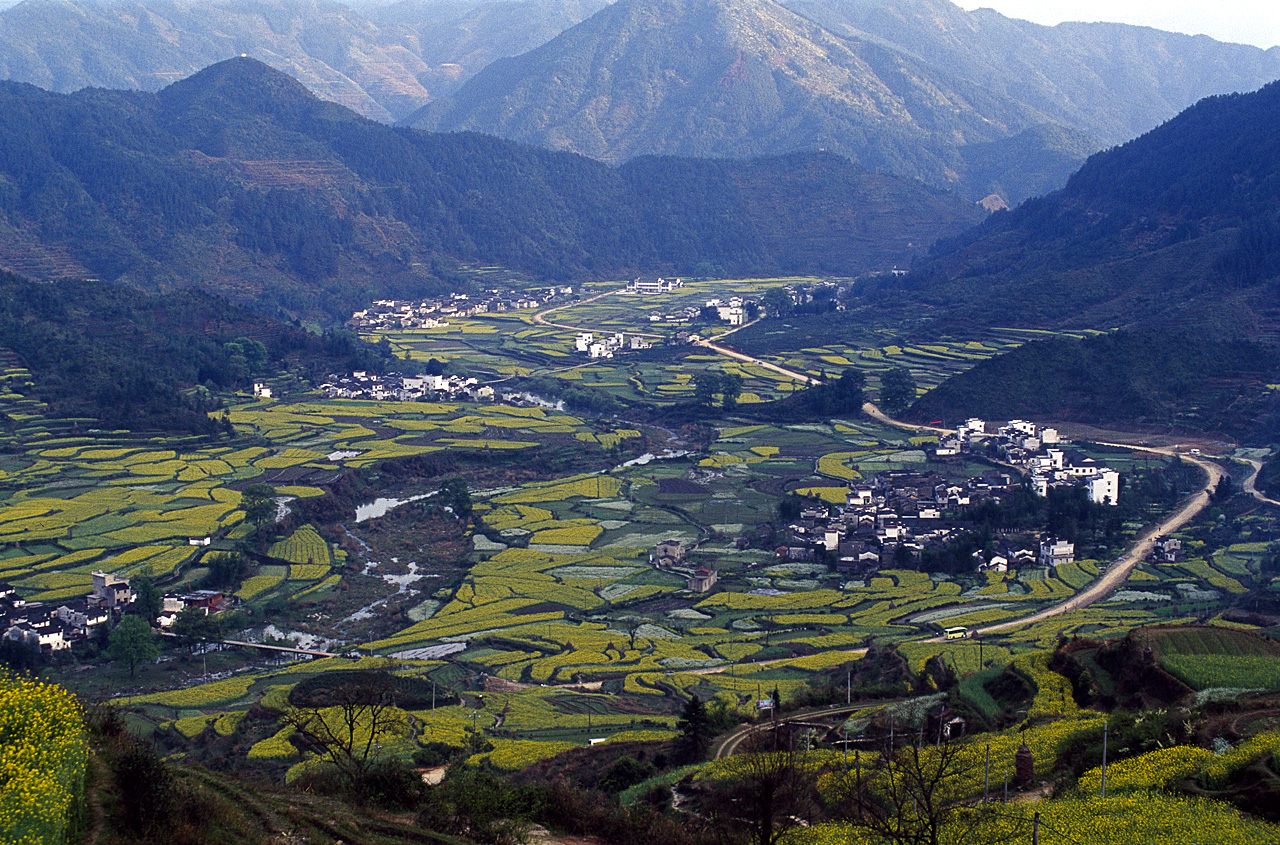
Jiangling

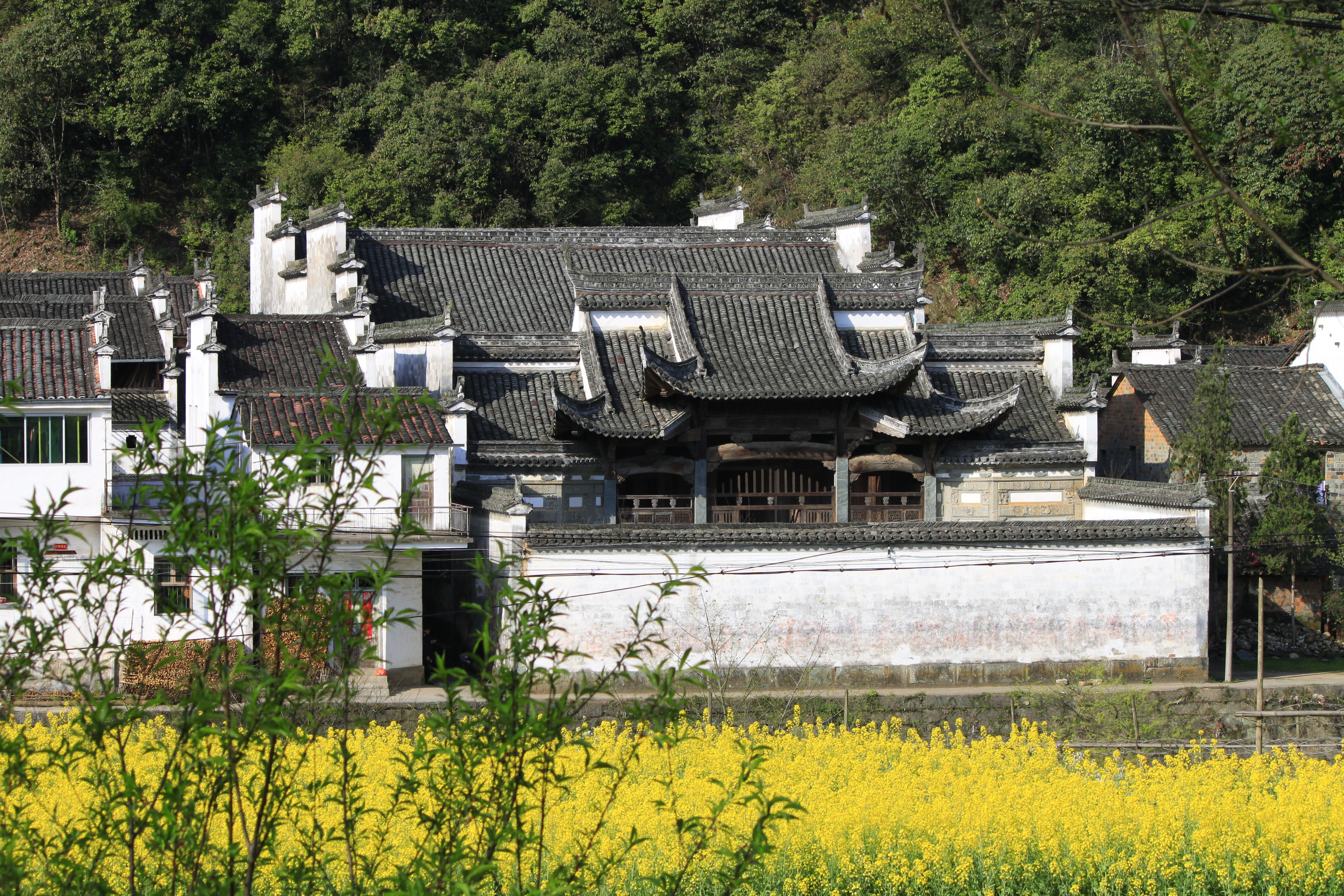
Huangcun, Dazhangshan

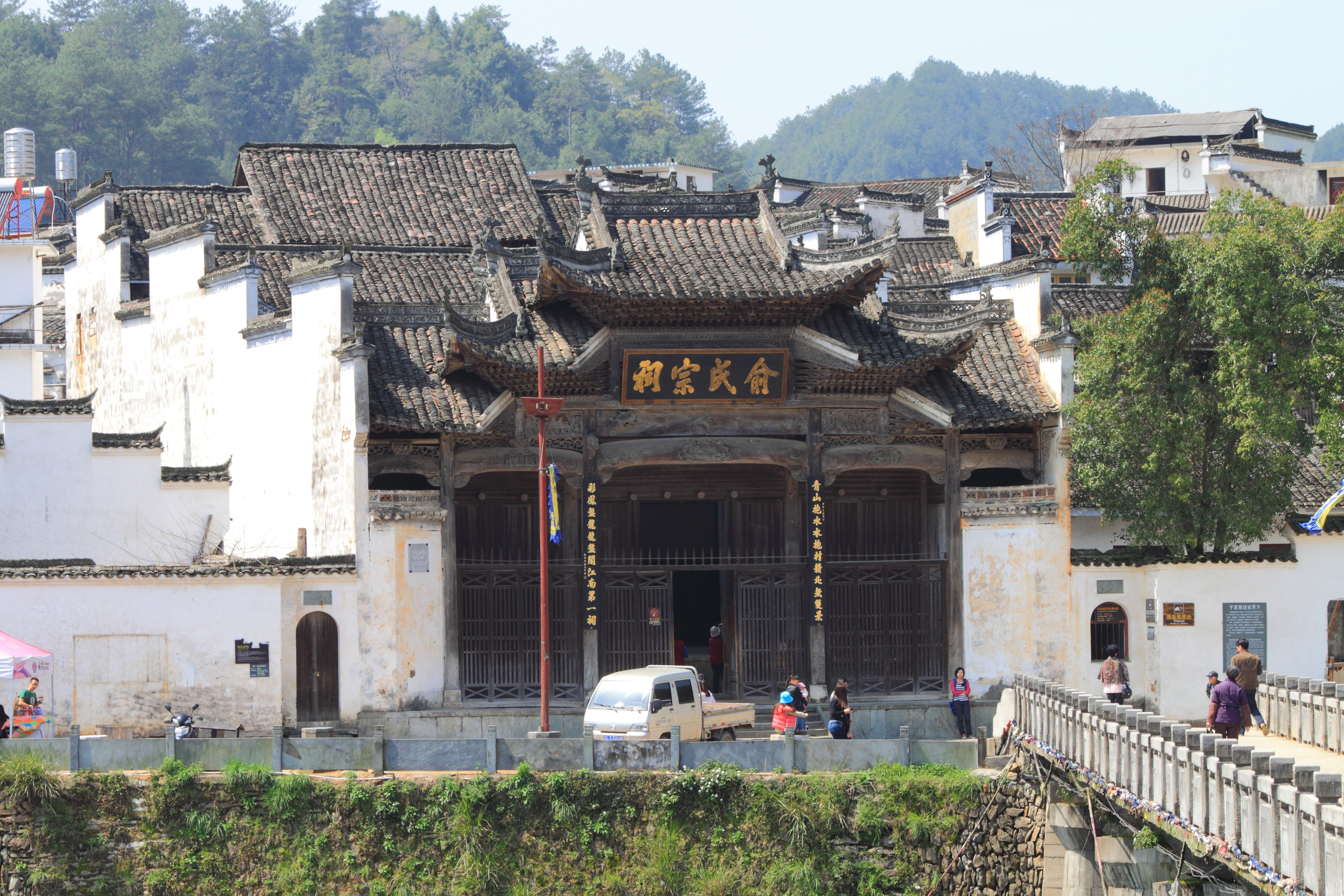
Wangkou

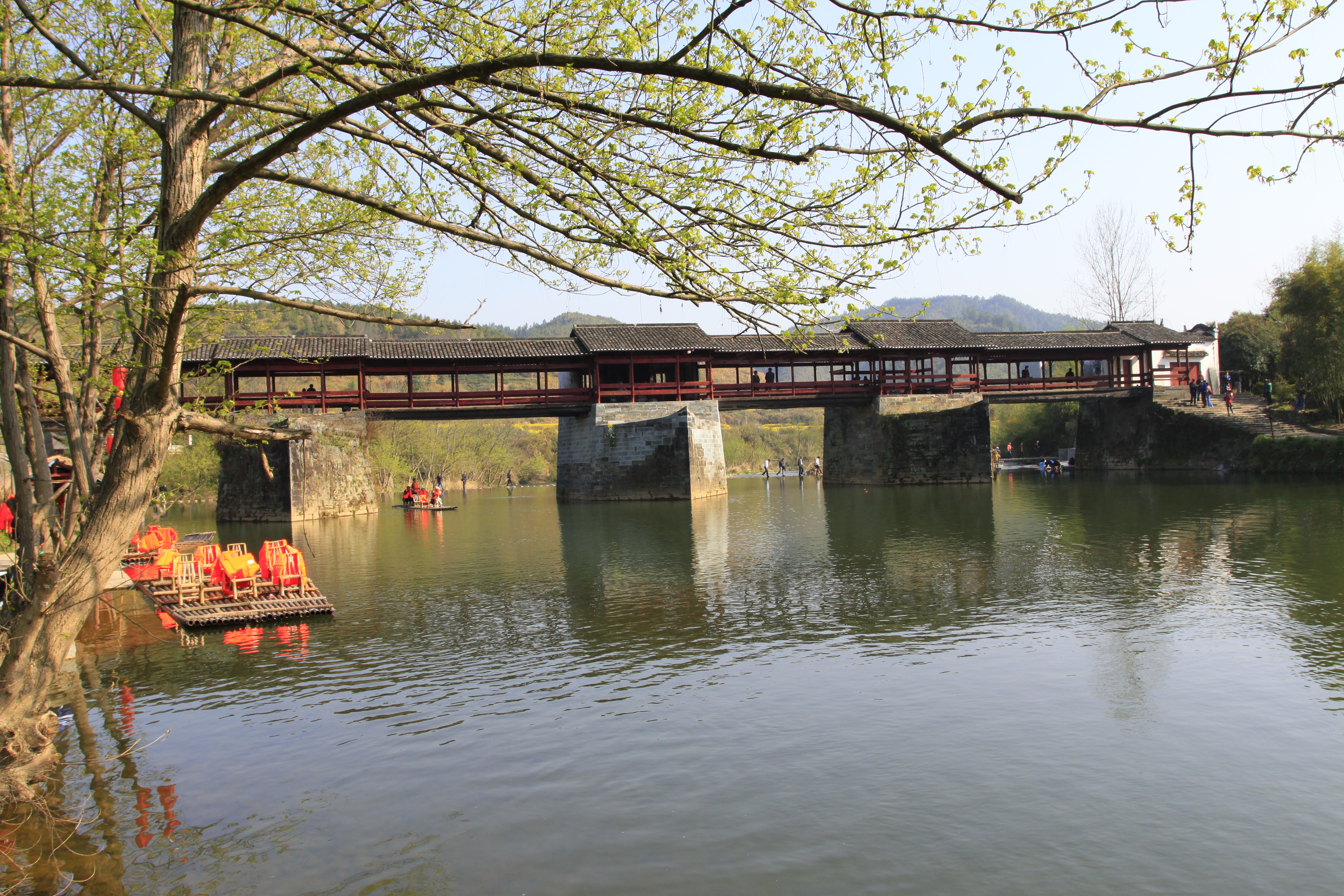
Caihong Bridge, Qinghua Town

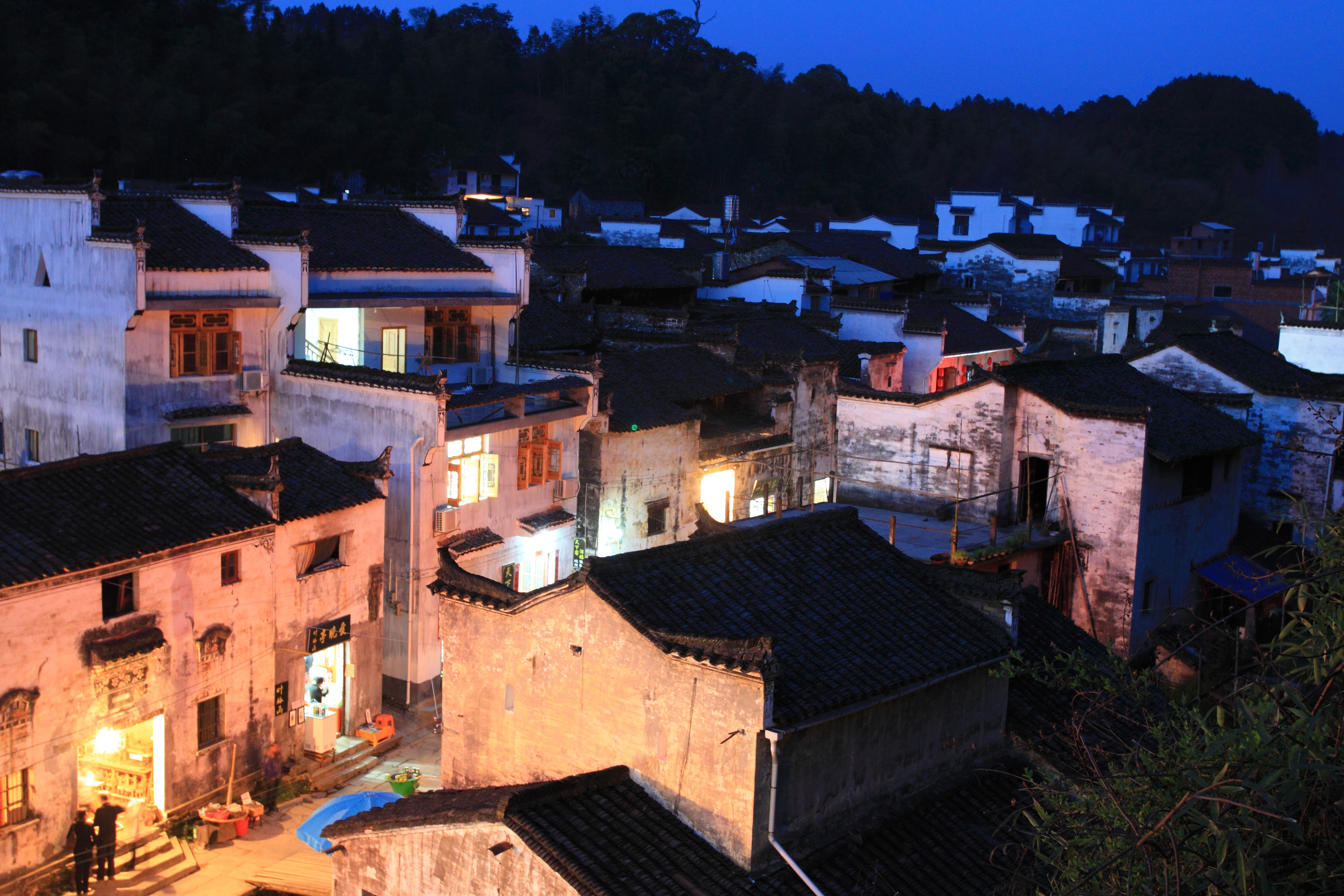
Likeng, Qiukou

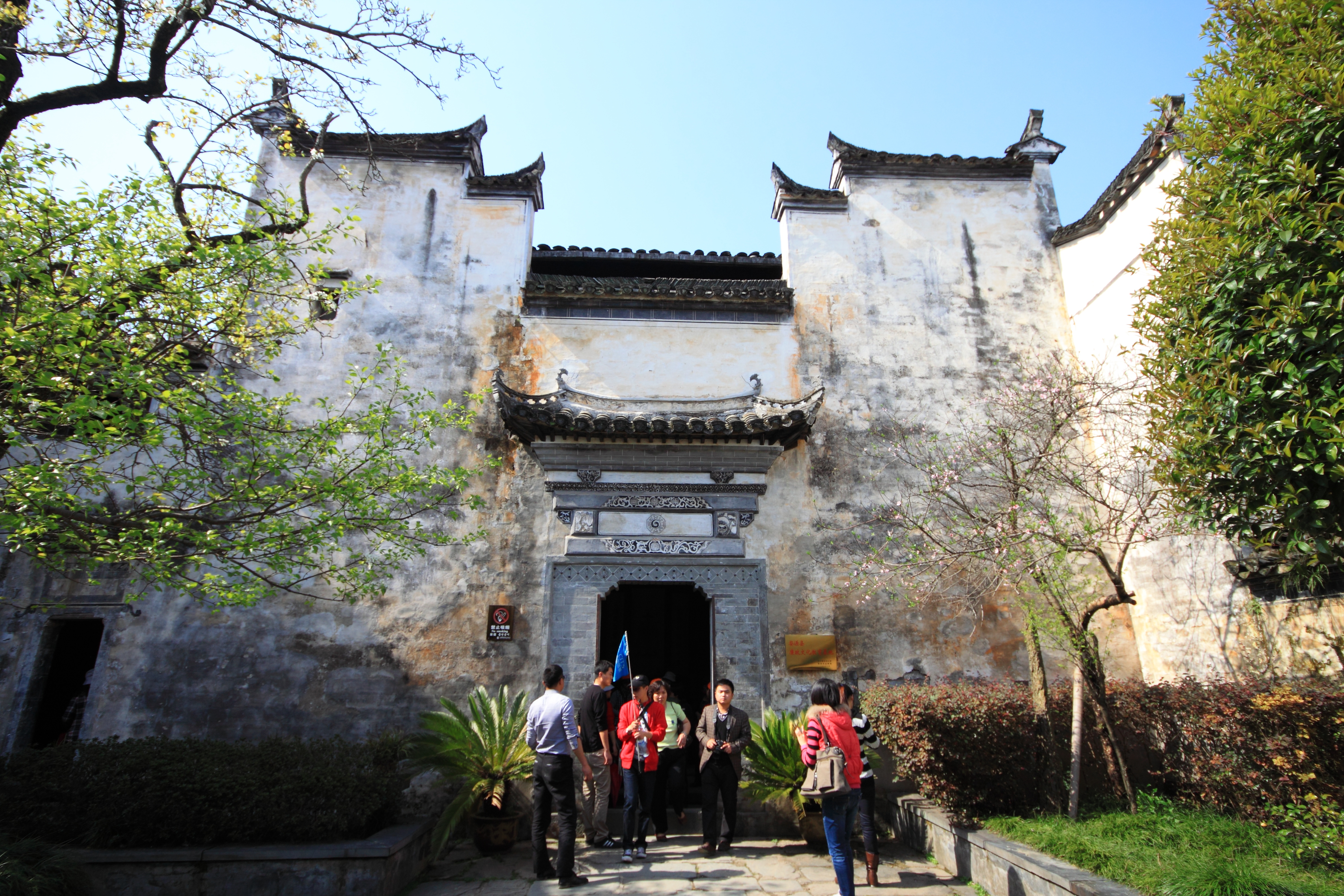
Jiangwan

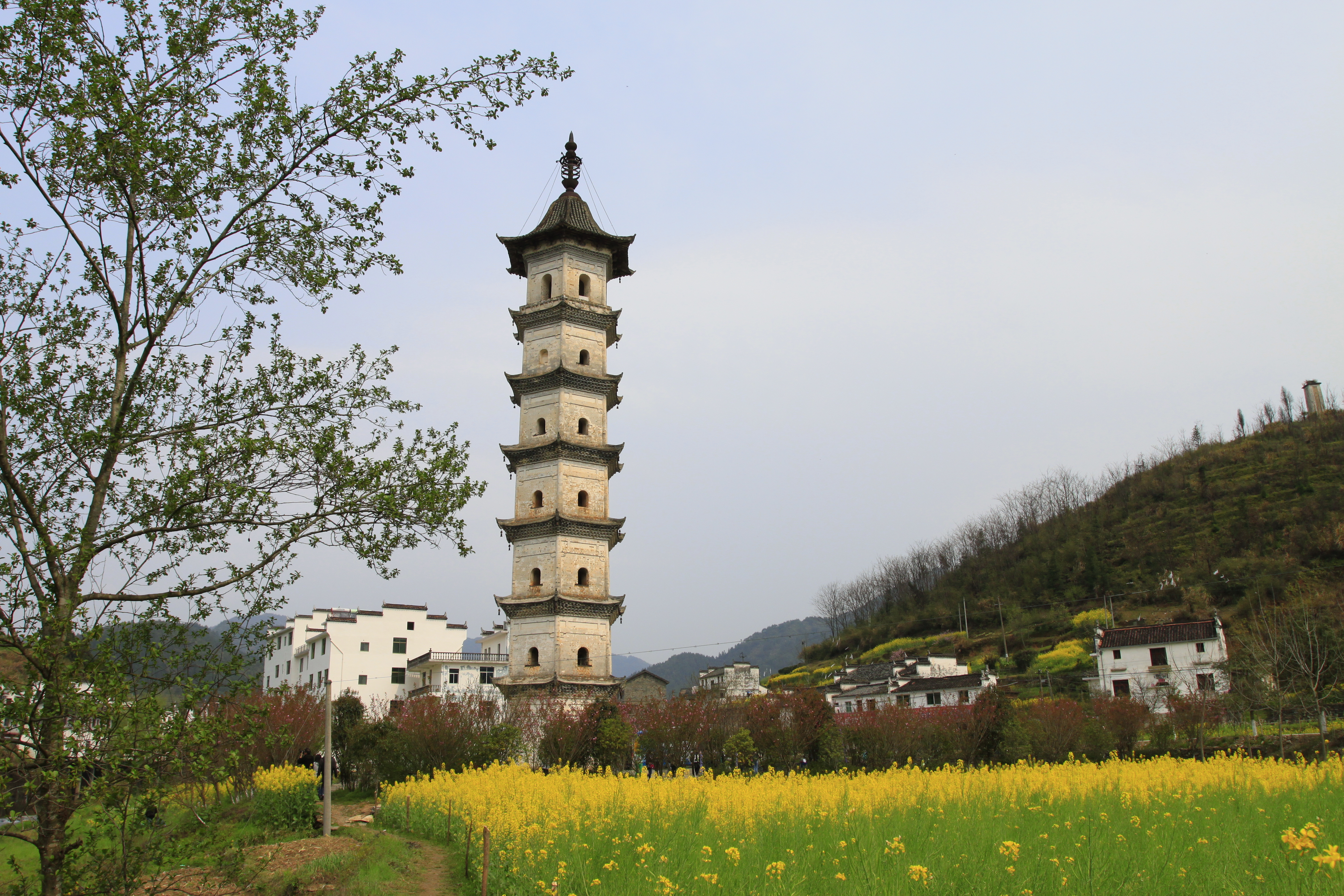
Longtian Pagoda

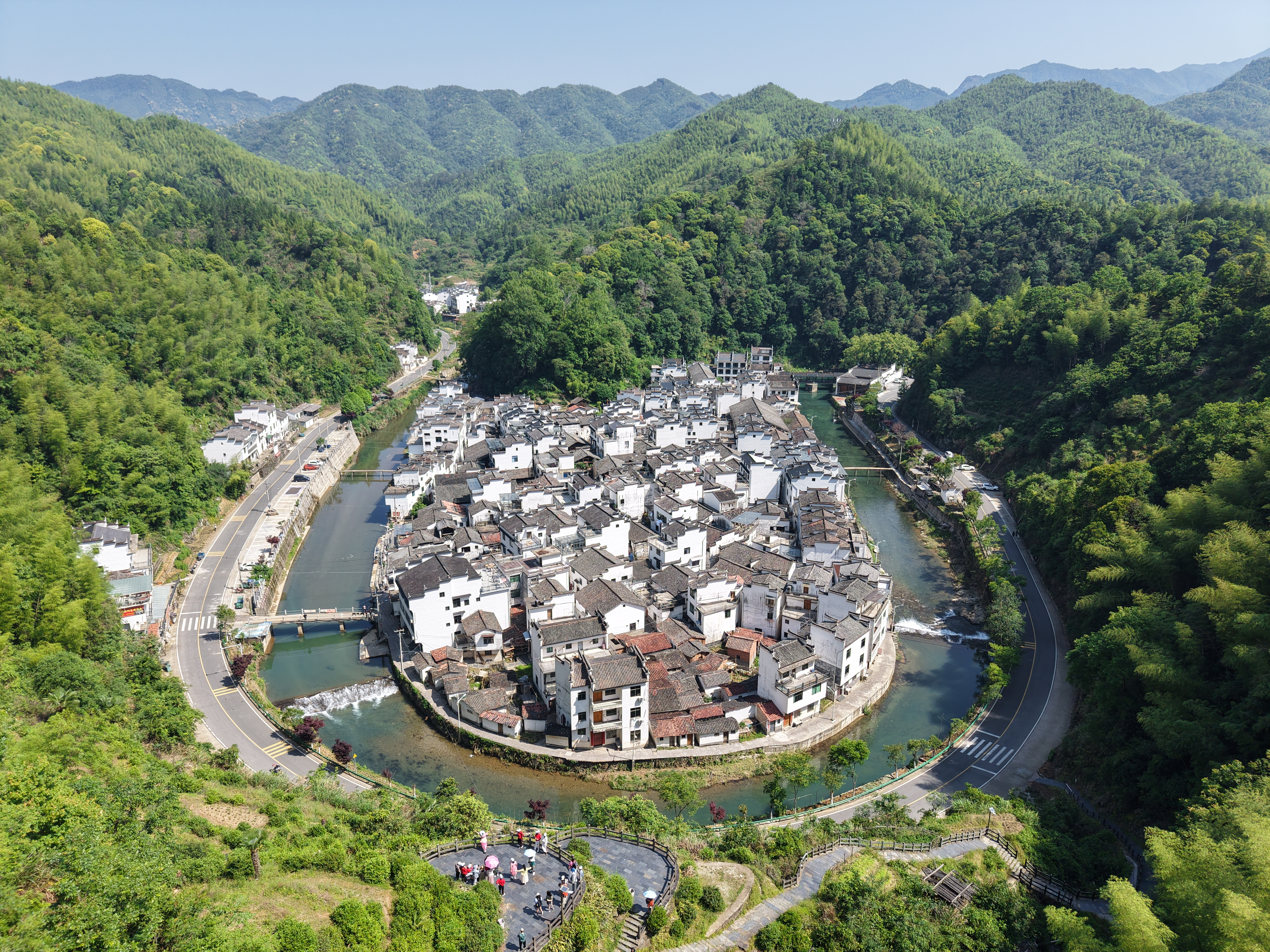
Jujing

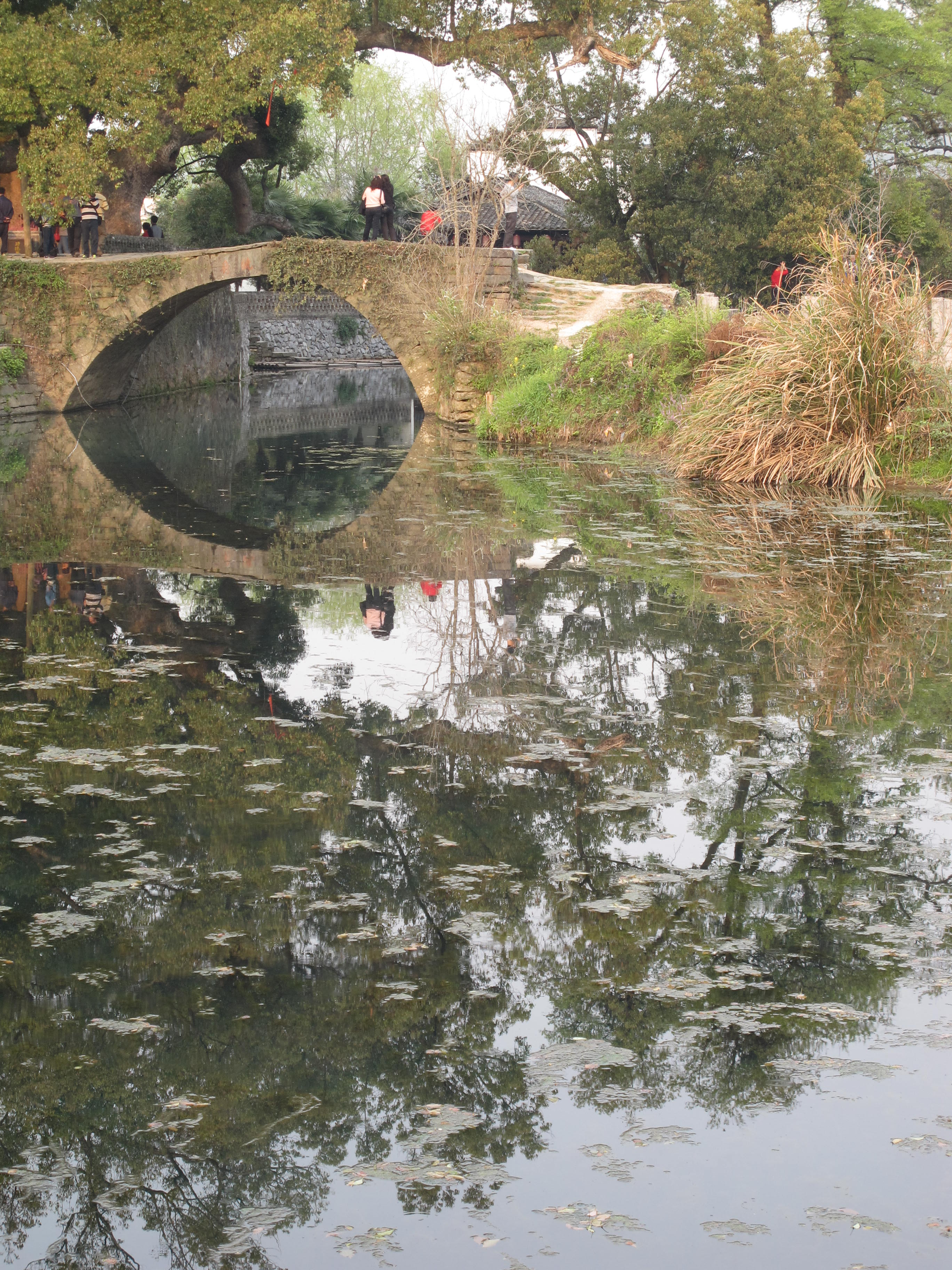

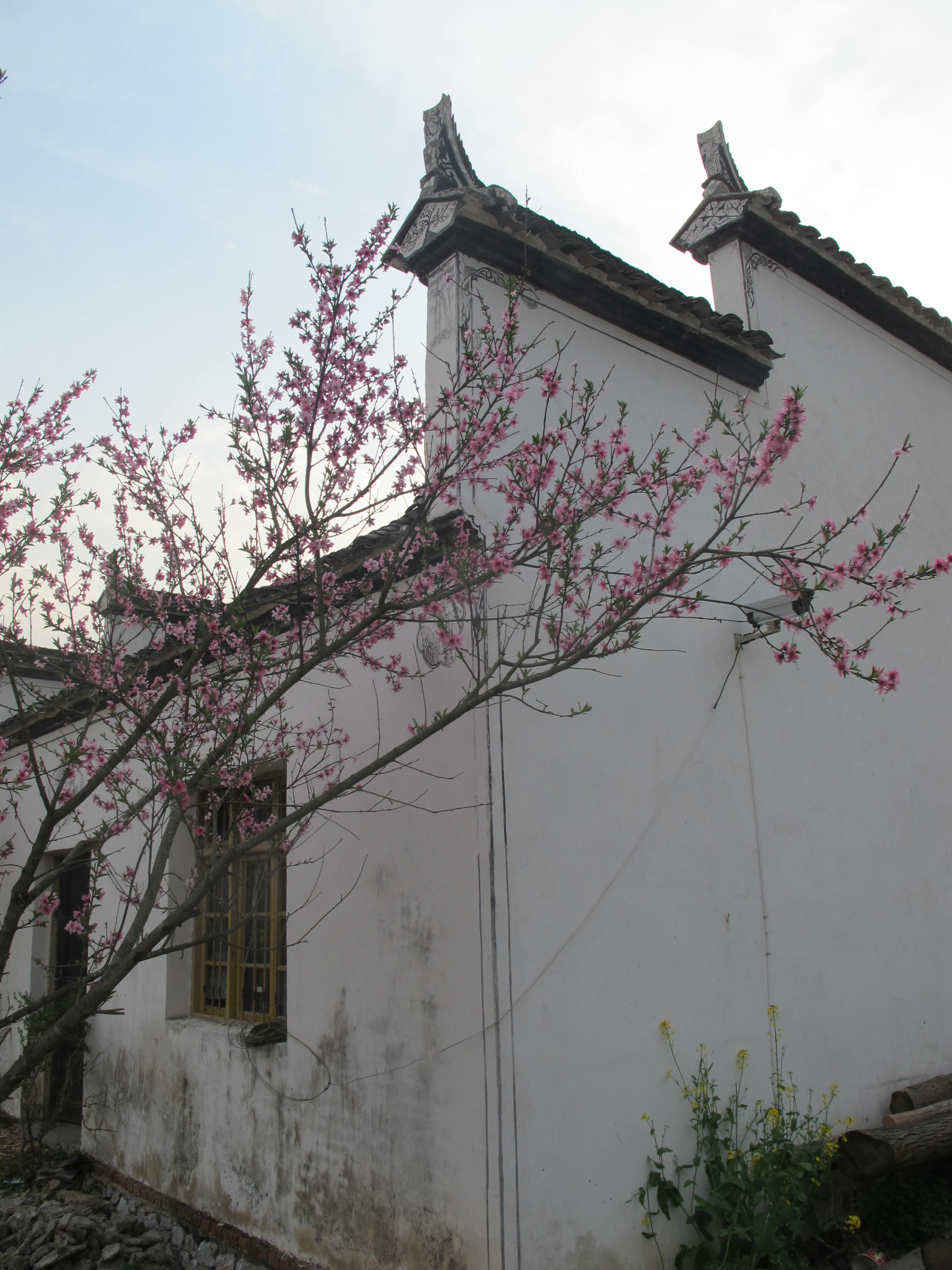
