= Wang Hui =

Wang Hui may refer to:

- Wang Hui (Han dynasty), minister of vassal affairs under Emperor Wu of Han
- Wang Hui (Tang dynasty) (fl. 846–891), Tang chancellor
- Wang Hui (Qing dynasty) (1632–1717), painter during the Ming and Qing dynasties
- Wang Hui (intellectual) (born 1959), professor of Chinese literature, intellectual historian, and former editor of Dushu
- Wang Hui (politician, born 1968), Chinese politician, a deputy minister of the Ministry of Housing and Urban-Rural Development

== Sportspeople ==
- Wong Fai (born 1970), born Wang Hui, Chinese sports shooter who later represented Hong Kong
- Wang Hui (wrestler) (born 1976), Chinese wrestler
- Wang Hui (table tennis) (born 1978), Chinese table tennis player
- Wang Hui (judoka) (born 1984), Chinese judoka
