= Heru Nerly =

Indonesian footballer (1980–2021)

Personal information
- Date of birth: 24 September 1980
- Place of birth: Ngada, East Nusa Tenggara, Indonesia
- Date of death: 31 August 2021 (aged 40)
- Height: 1.72 m (5 ft 8 in)
- Position: Winger

Senior career*
| Years | Team | Apps | (Gls) |
| 2000–2003 | PS Semen Tonasa | | |
| 2003–2004 | Persisam Putra Samarinda | | |
| 2004–2005 | Persibo Bojonegoro | | |
| 2005–2006 | Gresik United | | |
| 2006–2007 | PSBL Langsa | | |
| 2007–2009 | Persipura Jayapura | 38 | (4) |
| 2009–2010 | PSN Ngada | | |
| 2010–2011 | Persija Jakarta | 12 | (0) |
| 2011–2012 | PSM Makassar | 16 | (2) |
| 2012–2013 | Semen Padang | 18 | (1) |
| 2013–2014 | Mitra Kukar | 17 | (0) |

International career
| 2008 | Indonesia | 3 | (0) |
- * Club domestic league appearances and goals

Heru Nerly (24 September 1980 – 31 August 2021) was an Indonesian professional footballer who played as a winger. Before he turned professional, he worked as a fisherman.

== Honours ==
Persipura Jayapura

- Indonesia Super League: 2008–09
- Copa Indonesia runner-up: 2007–08, 2008–09
