= Huy (Egyptian name) =

Ancient Egyptian name

F18 Y1 i i
Hui
in hieroglyphs
Era: New Kingdom
(1550–1069 BC)

Hui or Huy was an ancient Egyptian name, frequently a nickname for Amenhotep.

Famous bearers:

- Huy, priestess during the Eighteenth dynasty, mother-in-law of Thutmose III
- Huy, High Priest of Ptah during the reign of Ramesses II
- Huy, viceroy of Kush during the reign of Ramesses II
- Amenhotep called Huy, a vizier of Amenhotep III
- Amenhotep called Huy, High Steward of Memphis during Amenhotep III
- Amenhotep called Huy, viceroy of Kush under Tutankhamen
