= Huizhou, Anhui =

Huizhou 徽州
- Region
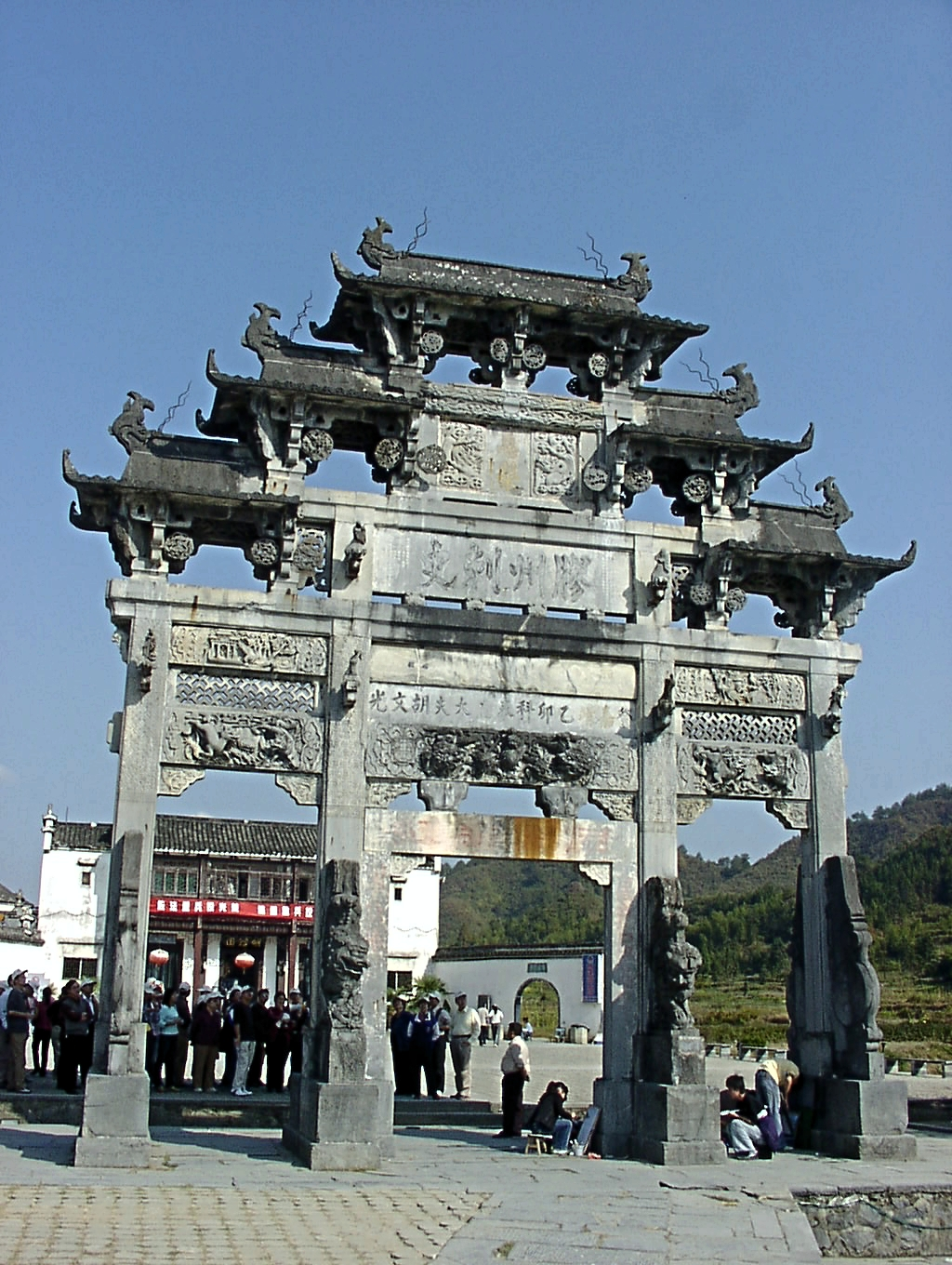
- Xidi, a World Heritage Site, is a village in Huizhou that was built by a merchant family during the Ming Dynasty

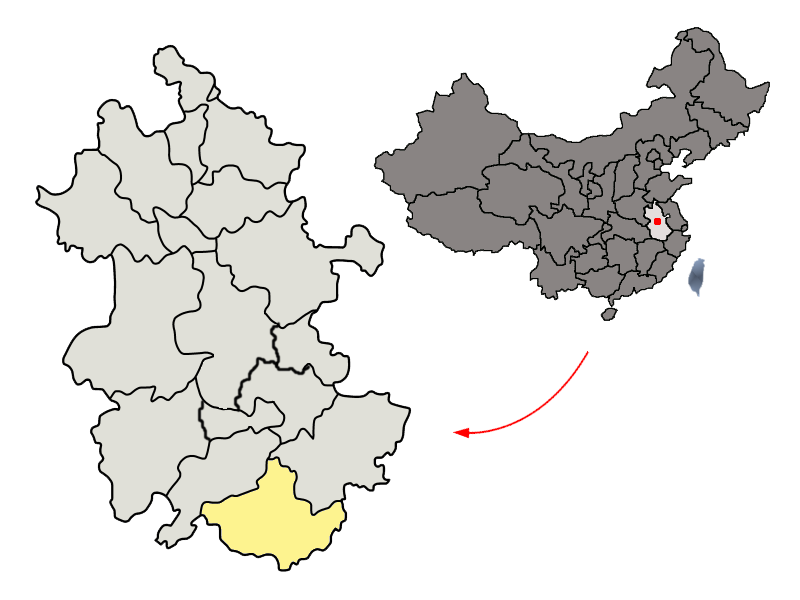
- Country: China
- Province: Anhui and Jiangxi

Area
  - Total: 13,870 km^{2} (5,360 sq mi)

Population (2010)
  - Total: 1,984,000 (approx.)
  - Density: 143.0/km^{2} (370.5/sq mi)

Huizhou (Chinese: 徽州; pinyin: Huīzhōu) is a historical region in Anhui Province which roughly corresponds to Huangshan City today – the southernmost region of the province. In Ming and Qing dynasties, Huizhou was a prefecture corresponding to Huangshan city and Jixi County of modern Xuancheng, plus Wuyuan County in northeastern Jiangxi. Anhui, the name of the province, is a portmanteau word combining the first characters of Anqing and Huizhou.

== History ==
During the Song dynasty (1211), Huizhou was named from Shezhou (歙州) or She Prefecture (歙), now the name of She County under Huangshan City. The prefecture remained intact for about 800 years with six counties: Shexian County (歙县), Yixian County (黟县), Xiuning (休宁), Qimen (祁门), Jixi (绩溪), and Wuyuan (婺源).

The region was known for its production of writing utensils. In the late Ming dynasty, the city also became known for publishing texts on a broad range of subjects, such as genealogy, classic literature, and illustrated novels and dramas. The carvers of the printing blocks were highly skilled, allowing the printed works to be of high quality.

== Geography ==
Huizhou is a mountainous region in the south of Anhui province. Huizhou is also well known for the scenic Huangshan Mountains, which the modern-day city is named after.

== Economy ==
Since the Ming dynasty, the merchants of Huizhou, collectively known in Chinese as Huishang (徽商; pinyin: Huīshāng), were renowned for their economic prowess. During the Ming and Qing dynasties, they formed a formidable political force both regionally and nationally.

After the Taiping Rebellion, Huizhou merchants became less prominent as the war disrupted trade in inland China.

== Culture ==
Huizhou has its own distinct culture as well as spoken dialect known as Huizhou Chinese and recognized as one of the main subdivisions of spoken Chinese. Peking opera, which arose in the 18th century, has its origins in a local opera form from Huizhou.

Hui cuisine, which is known for its extensive use of wild herbs, is one of the eight main Chinese cuisines.

== Architecture ==
Huizhou is famous for ancient streets and buildings, such as ancestral temple, memorial archway. Residential buildings in Huizhou attach importance to feng shui and yin-yang.

== Notable people ==
- Zhu Xi (1130-1200)
- Huang Binhong (1865-1955)
- Hu Shih (1891-1962)
- Tao Xingzhi (1891-1946)
- Hu Xueyan (1823-1885)
- Hu Zongxian (1512-1565)
- Zhan Tianyou (1861-1919)
- Sai Jinhua (1872-1936)
- Jiang Zemin (1926-2022)
- Hu Jintao (1942- )
- Wang Zhi (?-1560)
