= Yanzhou Prefecture =

Former administrative unit in Zhejiang, China

Yanzhou in Zhejiang during Ming and Qing dynasties

Yanzhou Prefecture (simplified Chinese: 严州府; traditional Chinese: 嚴州府; pinyin: Yánzhōu fǔ) was an administrative unit (prefecture) in Zhejiang Province of China during the Ming and Qing dynasties. It was abolished in 1912, soon after the fall of the Qing. The territory of the former Yanzhou Prefecture is now part of the Hangzhou Prefecture-level city.

The prefectural capital was in Jiande, which, on account of this, was often referred to as Yanzhou Fu (严州府) both in Chinese and in Western languages. A transcription commonly seen in both French and English writing of the time was Yen-tcheou-fou, derived from French missionary writing.

== Divisions ==
Yanzhou prefecture was composed of the following subdivisions.

- Jiande County (建德縣/建德县)
- Tonglu County (桐廬縣/桐庐县)
- Chun'an County (淳安縣/淳安县)
- Fenshui County (分水縣/分水县)
- Sui'an County (遂安縣/遂安县)
- Shouchang County (壽昌縣/寿昌县)

== See also ==
- Muzhou, the prefecture during the Sui, Tang, Wuyue and Song dynasties
- Qiandao Lake, the reservoir built in the heart of Yanzhou, leading the dissolution of the prefecture
