= Qimen County =

Qimen 祁门县 Kimen
- County
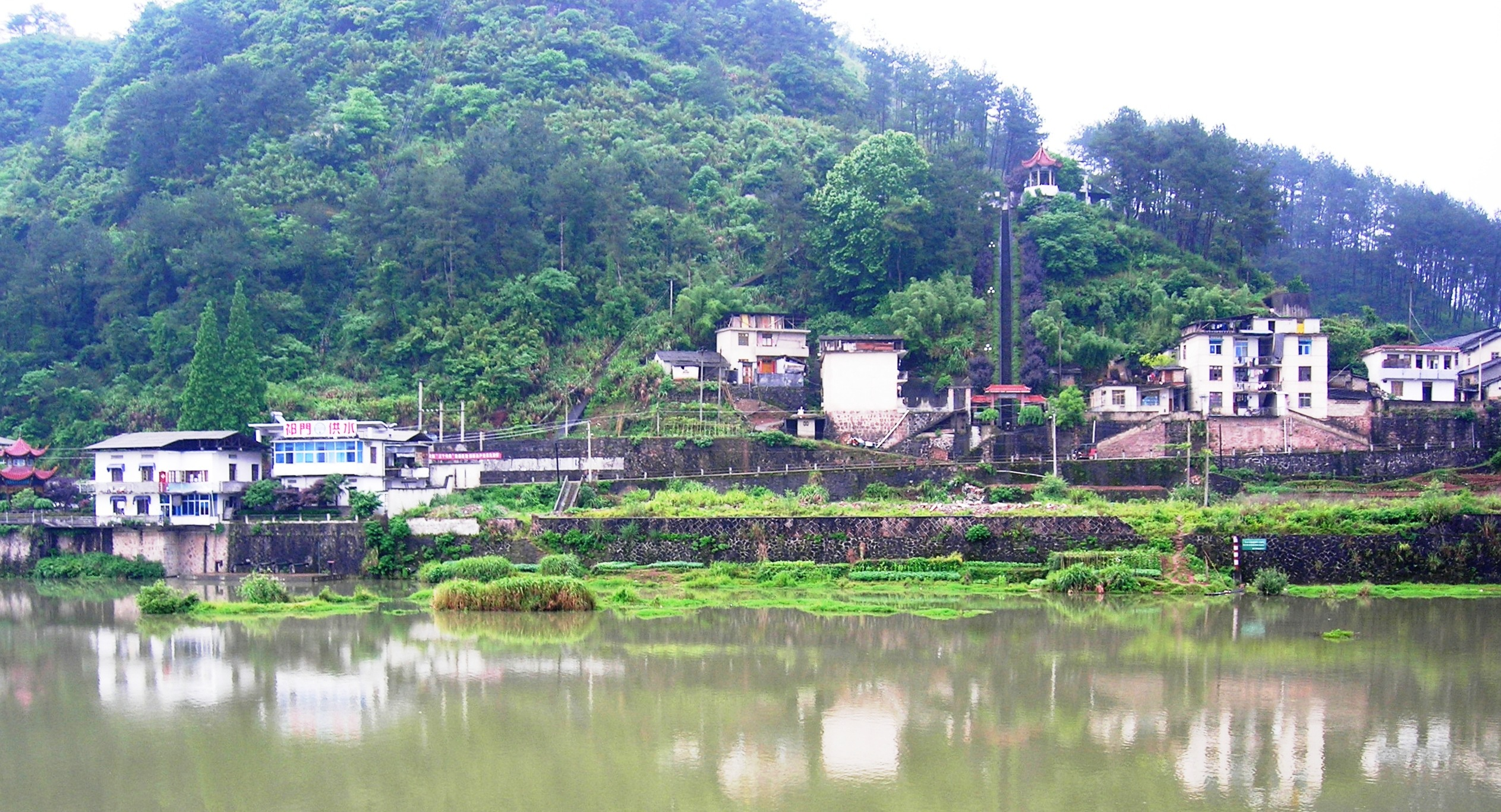

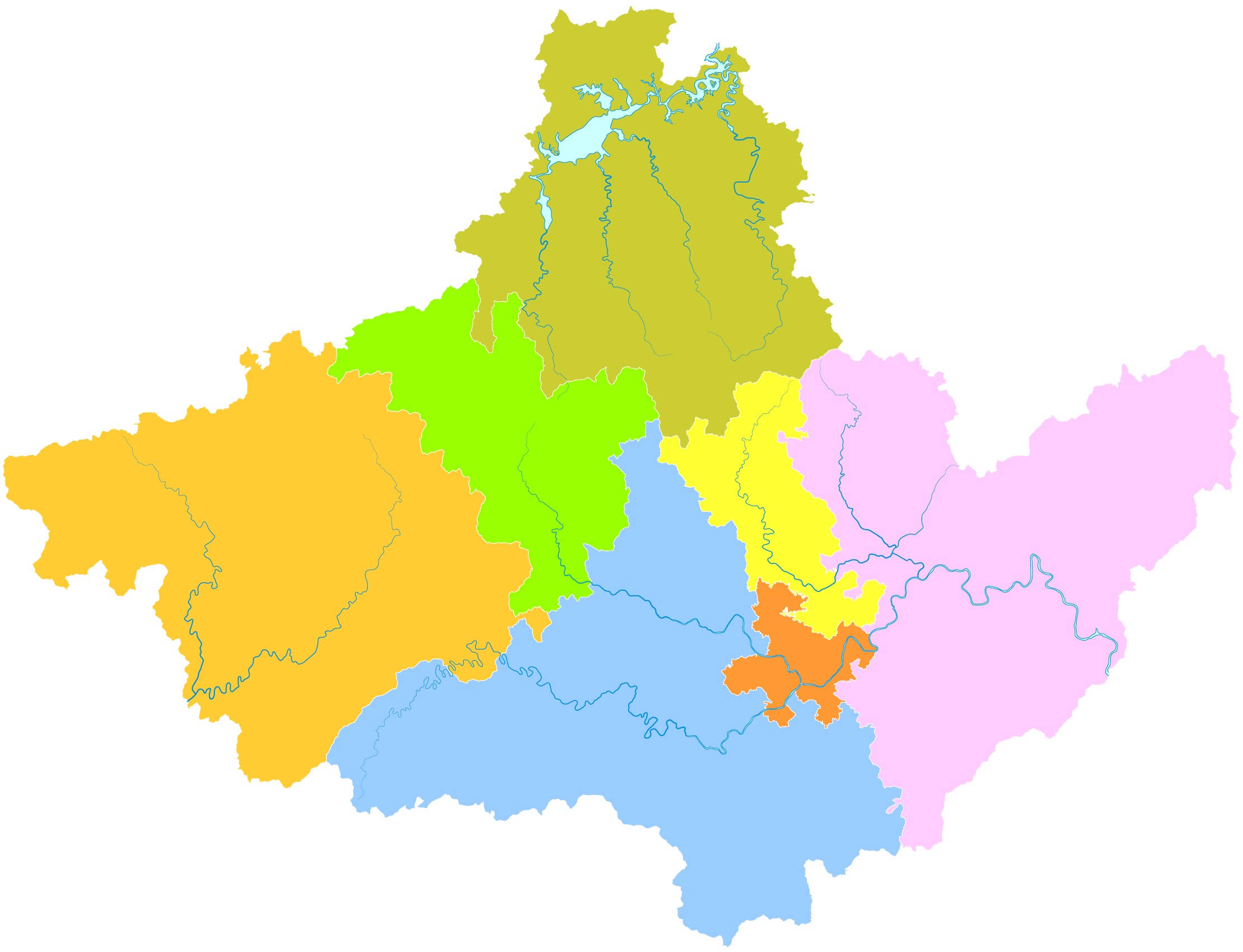
- Qimen is the westernmost division in this map of Huangshan

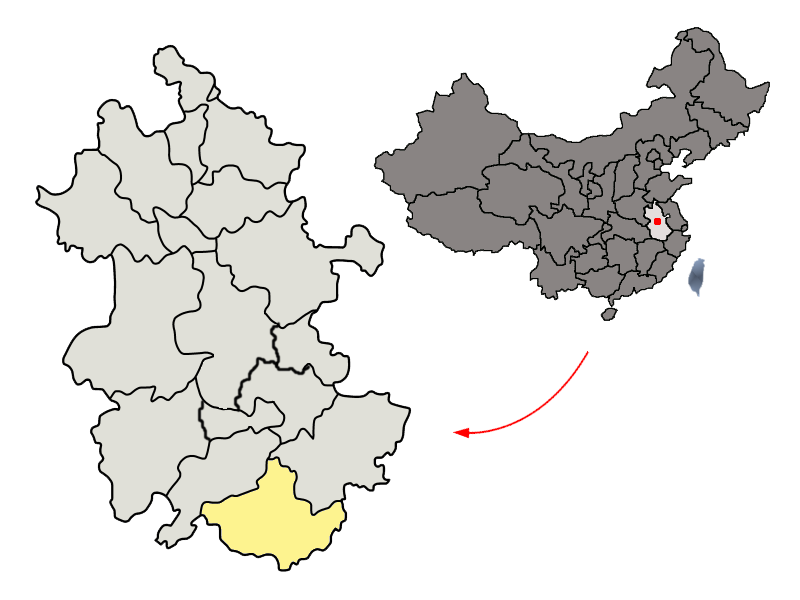
- Huangshan in Anhui
- Coordinates: 29°51′14″N 117°43′01″E
- Country: China
- Province: Anhui
- Prefecture-level city: Huangshan
- County seat: Qishan Town

Area
  - Total: 2,257 km^{2} (871 sq mi)

Population (2020)
  - Total: 145,644
  - Density: 64.53/km^{2} (167.1/sq mi)
- Time zone: UTC+8 (China Standard)
- Postal code: 245600

Qimen County (simplified Chinese: 祁门县; traditional Chinese: 祁門縣; pinyin: Qímén Xiàn; alternately romanized as Keemun) is a county in the southeast of Anhui Province, China, bordering Jiangxi Province to the southwest. It is the westernmost county-level division of the prefecture-level city of Huangshan City. It has a population of 190,000 and an area of 2,257 square kilometres (871 sq mi). The government of Qimen County is located in Qishan Town.

== History ==
Qimen County was established in 766 during the Tang dynasty (Yongtai Era 2). It takes its name from the Mount Qi in the northeast and the Chang River (阊江) in the southwest.

The headquarters of the Xiang Army were in Qimen during part of the Taiping Rebellion.

== Administrative divisions ==
Qimen County has jurisdiction over 10 towns and 8 townships.

Towns

- Qishan (祁山镇)
- Xiaolukou (小路口镇)
- Jinzipai (金字牌镇)
- Pingli (平里镇)
- Likou (历口镇)
- Shanli (闪里镇)
- Anling (安凌镇)
- Fufeng (凫峰镇)
- Tafang (塔坊镇)
- Xin'an (新安镇)

Townships

- Datan Township (大坦乡)
- Baixi Township (柏溪乡)
- Qihong Township (祁红乡)
- Rongkou Township (溶口乡)
- Luxi Township (芦溪乡)
- Zhukou Township (渚口乡)
- Guxi Township (古溪乡)
- Ruokeng Township (箬坑乡)

== Climate ==
Climate data for Qimen, elevation 191 m (627 ft), (1991–2020 normals, extremes 1981–2010)
Month	Jan	Feb	Mar	Apr	May	Jun	Jul	Aug	Sep	Oct	Nov	Dec	Year
Record high °C (°F)	23.9 (75.0)	28.4 (83.1)	34.0 (93.2)	34.4 (93.9)	35.5 (95.9)	37.0 (98.6)	39.5 (103.1)	41.5 (106.7)	38.6 (101.5)	36.8 (98.2)	30.7 (87.3)	23.7 (74.7)	41.5 (106.7)
Mean daily maximum °C (°F)	9.7 (49.5)	12.5 (54.5)	16.7 (62.1)	22.9 (73.2)	27.3 (81.1)	29.5 (85.1)	33.1 (91.6)	33.1 (91.6)	29.6 (85.3)	24.5 (76.1)	18.5 (65.3)	12.3 (54.1)	22.5 (72.5)
Daily mean °C (°F)	4.3 (39.7)	6.7 (44.1)	10.7 (51.3)	16.4 (61.5)	21.2 (70.2)	24.4 (75.9)	27.5 (81.5)	27.2 (81.0)	23.5 (74.3)	17.7 (63.9)	11.6 (52.9)	5.9 (42.6)	16.4 (61.6)
Mean daily minimum °C (°F)	0.8 (33.4)	2.8 (37.0)	6.5 (43.7)	11.9 (53.4)	16.8 (62.2)	20.9 (69.6)	23.6 (74.5)	23.3 (73.9)	19.3 (66.7)	13.2 (55.8)	7.2 (45.0)	1.8 (35.2)	12.3 (54.2)
Record low °C (°F)	−9.6 (14.7)	−7.9 (17.8)	−7.3 (18.9)	−1.2 (29.8)	7.4 (45.3)	11.1 (52.0)	17.5 (63.5)	16.8 (62.2)	8.6 (47.5)	−0.2 (31.6)	−6.1 (21.0)	−13.2 (8.2)	−13.2 (8.2)
Average precipitation mm (inches)	90.1 (3.55)	107.5 (4.23)	171.8 (6.76)	203.2 (8.00)	245.7 (9.67)	386.5 (15.22)	246.8 (9.72)	147.0 (5.79)	72.6 (2.86)	58.3 (2.30)	71.0 (2.80)	58.0 (2.28)	1,858.5 (73.18)
Average precipitation days (≥ 0.1 mm)	13.0	13.1	15.9	15.1	14.8	16.6	13.2	13.7	8.1	6.9	9.9	9.7	150
Average snowy days	3.8	2.0	0.5	0	0	0	0	0	0	0	0.2	1.3	7.8
Average relative humidity (%)	80	80	80	79	81	85	83	82	80	79	81	79	81
Mean monthly sunshine hours	101.0	97.9	110.6	132.0	155.7	128.0	199.8	198.9	174.6	166.1	136.7	128.7	1,730
Percentage possible sunshine	31	31	30	34	37	31	47	49	48	47	43	41	39
Source: China Meteorological Administration

== Economy ==
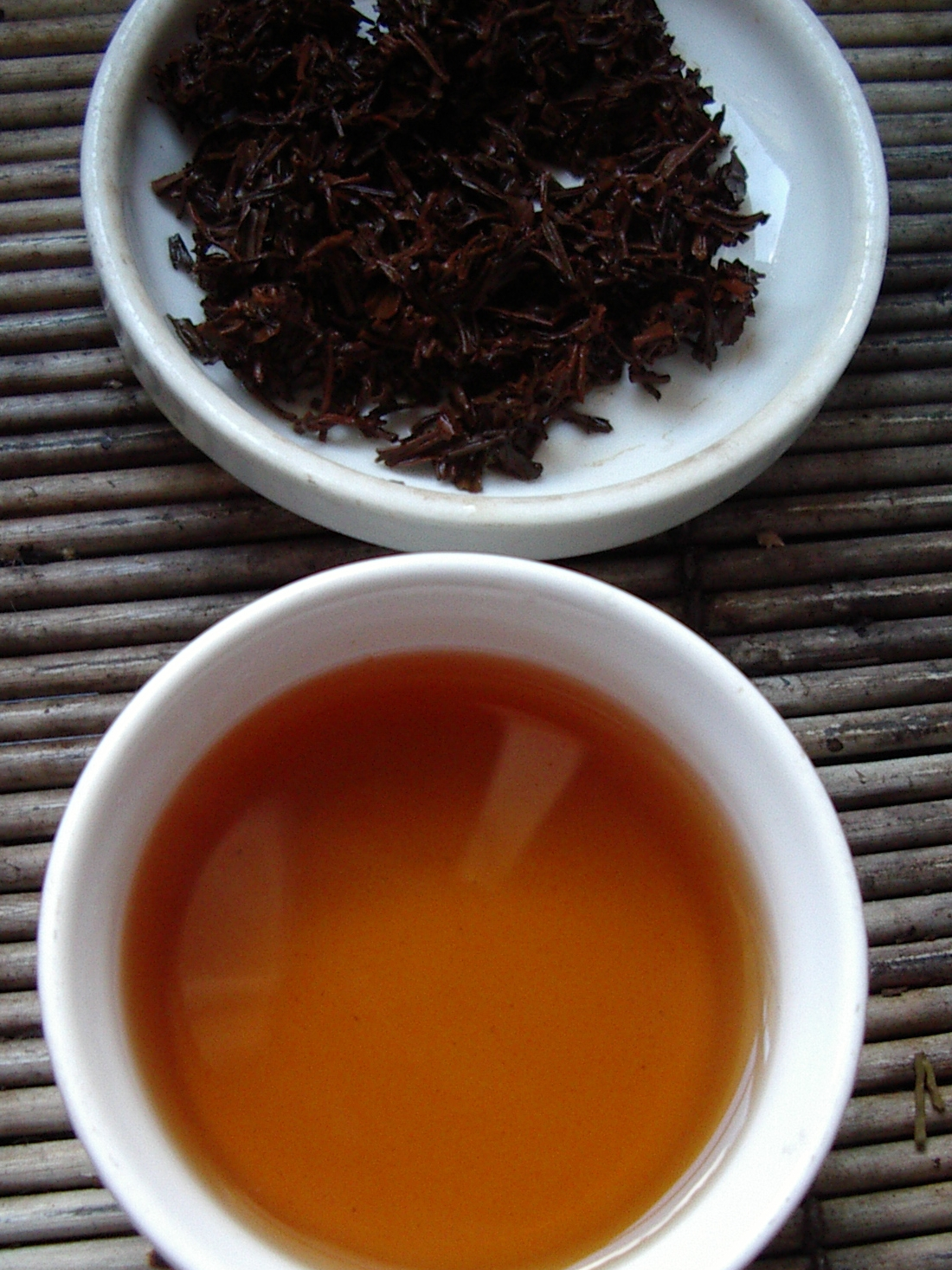
Keemun tea is produced in Qimen County

Qimen County is a tea-producing region, and the black tea called Keemun tea is named after Qimen.

== Transportation ==
=== Rail ===
Qimen is served by the Anhui–Jiangxi Railway.

== Places of interest ==
The area around the border with Shitai County contains a National Nature Reserve. It includes a 1,700-metre-high (5,600 ft) peak in the Huangshan Mountains.
