= Heru (ornamental comb) =

Traditional Māori comb

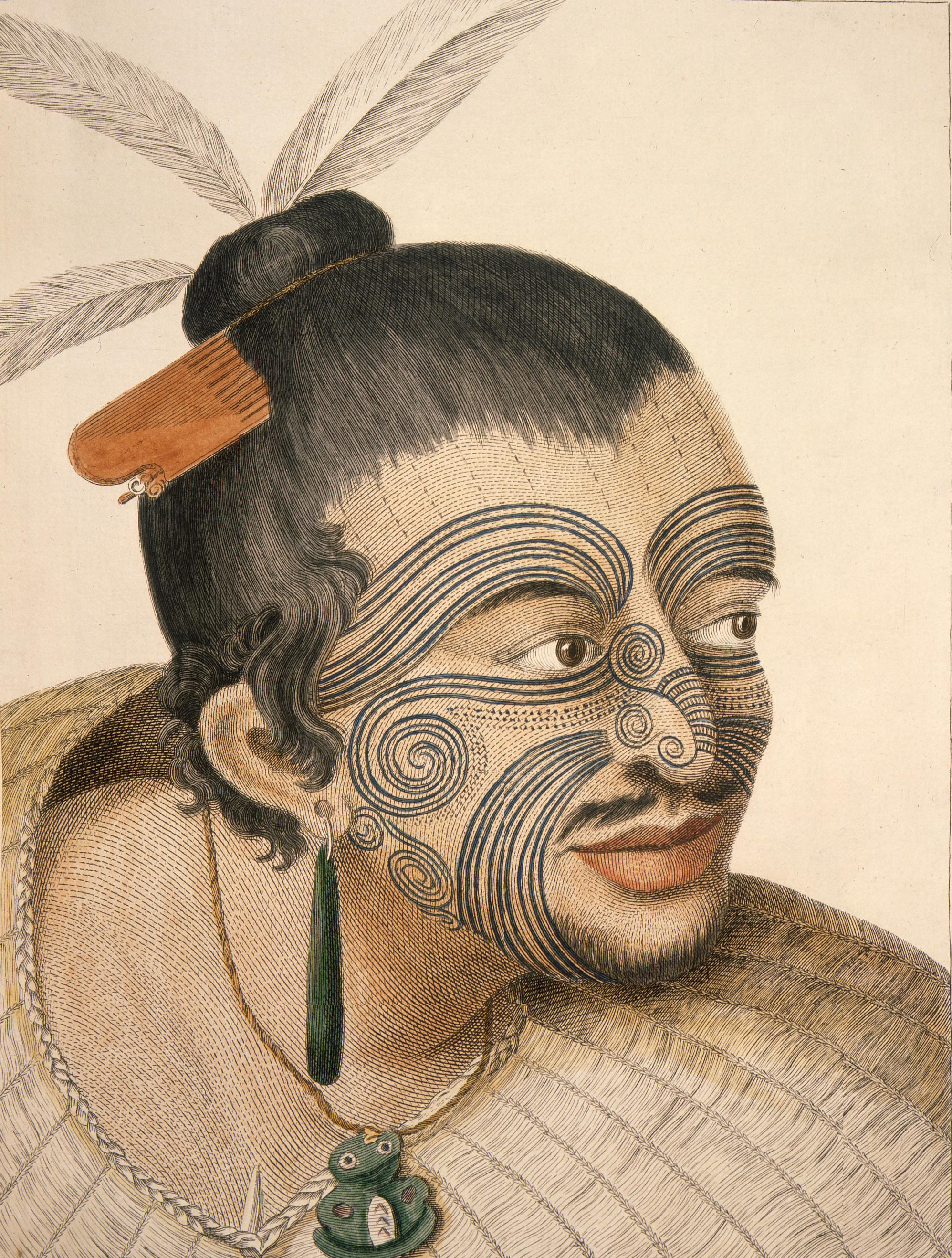
Māori man wearing a heru

A heru is a traditional ornamental comb of the Māori of New Zealand. They were carved from a solid piece of either wood or whale bone or made from individual teeth lashed together. They were used by men to fasten their long hair up into topknots. The heru indicated the rank of the wearer.
