= Huizhou District =

Huizhou 徽州区
- District
- Interactive map of Huizhou
- Coordinates: 29°49′37″N 118°20′13″E
- Country: China
- Province: Anhui
- Prefecture-level city: Huangshan
- District seat: Yansi

Area
  - Total: 419.4164 km^{2} (161.9376 sq mi)

Population (2020)
  - Total: 96,162
  - Density: 229.28/km^{2} (593.82/sq mi)
- Time zone: UTC+8 (China Standard)
- Postal code: 245061
- Division code: HZQ

Huizhou District (simplified Chinese: 徽州区; traditional Chinese: 徽州區; pinyin: Huīzhōu Qū) is a district of Huangshan City, Anhui province, China. It has a population of 95,000 {2018} and an area of 424 square kilometres (164 sq mi). It was carved out from Shexian County (歙县) after the 1987 renaming of the entire region from Huizhou to Huangshan City.

== Administrative divisions ==
Huizhou District has jurisdiction over 4 towns and 3 townships.

Towns

- Yansi (岩寺镇)
- Xixinan (西溪南镇)
- Qiankou (潜口镇)
- Chengkan (呈坎镇)

Townships

- Qiashe Township (洽舍乡)
- Fuxi Township (富溪乡)
- Yangcun Township (杨村乡)
