= List of Malkaridae species =

This page lists all described species of the spider family Malkaridae accepted by the World Spider Catalog as of February 2021:

== A ==
=== Anarchaea ===
Anarchaea Rix, 2006

- A. corticola (Hickman, 1969) (type) — Australia (Tasmania)
- A. falcata Rix, 2006 — Australia (New South Wales)
- A. raveni Rix, 2006 — Australia (Queensland)
- A. robusta (Rix, 2005) — Australia (Tasmania)

== C ==
=== Carathea ===
Carathea Moran, 1986

- C. miyali Moran, 1986 — Australia (Tasmania)
- C. parawea Moran, 1986 (type) — Australia (Tasmania)

=== Chilenodes ===
Chilenodes Platnick & Forster, 1987

- C. australis Platnick & Forster, 1987 (type) — Chile, Argentina

== F ==
=== Flavarchaea ===
Flavarchaea Rix, 2006

- F. anzac Rix, 2006 — Australia (Queensland)
- F. badja Rix, 2006 — Australia (New South Wales, Australian Capital Territory)
- F. barmah Rix, 2006 — Australia (New South Wales, Victoria)
- F. hickmani (Rix, 2005) — Australia (Tasmania)
- F. humboldti Rix & Harvey, 2010 — New Caledonia
- F. lofty Rix, 2006 — Australia (South Australia)
- F. lulu (Rix, 2005) (type) — Australia (Tasmania)
- F. stirlingensis Rix, 2006 — Australia (Western Australia)

=== Forstrarchaea ===
Forstrarchaea Rix, 2006

- F. rubra (Forster, 1949) (type) — New Zealand

== M ==
=== Malkara ===
Malkara

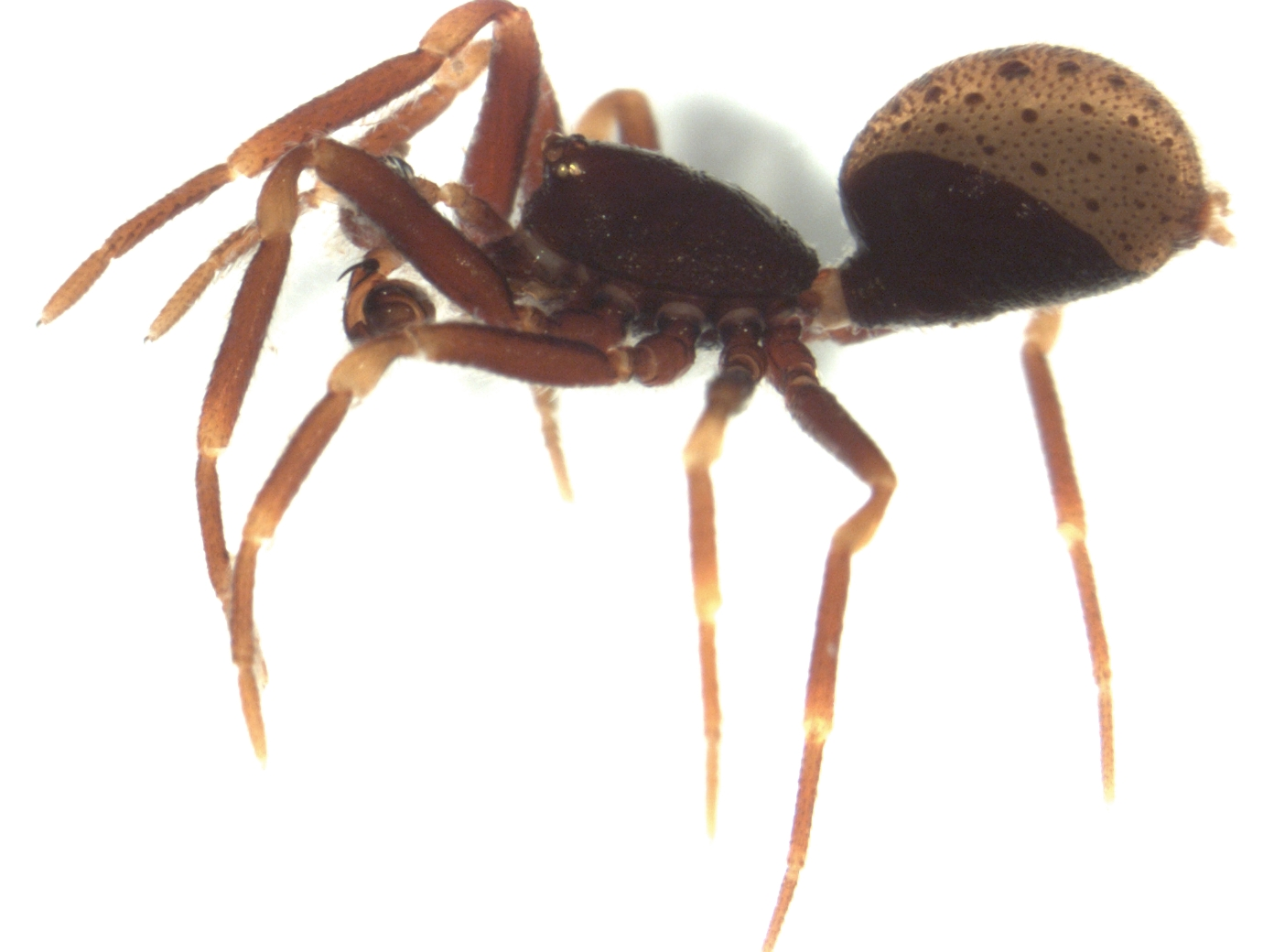
Malkara sp, male

Malkara Davies, 1980

- M. loricata Davies, 1980 (type) — Australia (Queensland)

== N ==
=== Nanarchaea ===
Nanarchaea Rix, 2006

- N. binnaburra (Forster, 1955) (type) — Australia (Queensland)
- N. bryophila (Hickman, 1969) — Australia (New South Wales, Victoria, Tasmania)

== O ==
=== Ozarchaea ===
Ozarchaea Rix, 2006

- O. bodalla Rix, 2006 — Australia (New South Wales)
- O. bondi Rix, 2006 — Australia (New South Wales)
- O. daviesae Rix, 2006 — Australia (Queensland)
- O. forsteri Rix, 2006 — New Zealand
- O. harveyi Rix, 2006 — Australia (Western Australia)
- O. janineae Rix, 2006 — Australia (New South Wales)
- O. ornata (Hickman, 1969) (type) — Australia (Tasmania)
- O. platnicki Rix, 2006 — Australia (Queensland)
- O. saxicola (Hickman, 1969) — Australia (Tasmania)
- O. spurgeon Rix, 2006 — Australia (Queensland)
- O. stradbroke Rix, 2006 — Australia (Queensland)
- O. valida Rix, 2006 — Australia (New South Wales)
- O. waldockae Rix, 2006 — Australia (Western Australia)
- O. werrikimbe Rix, 2006 — Australia (New South Wales)
- O. westraliensis Rix, 2006 — Australia (Western Australia)
- O. wiangarie Rix, 2006 — Australia (New South Wales)

== P ==
=== Pararchaea ===
Pararchaea

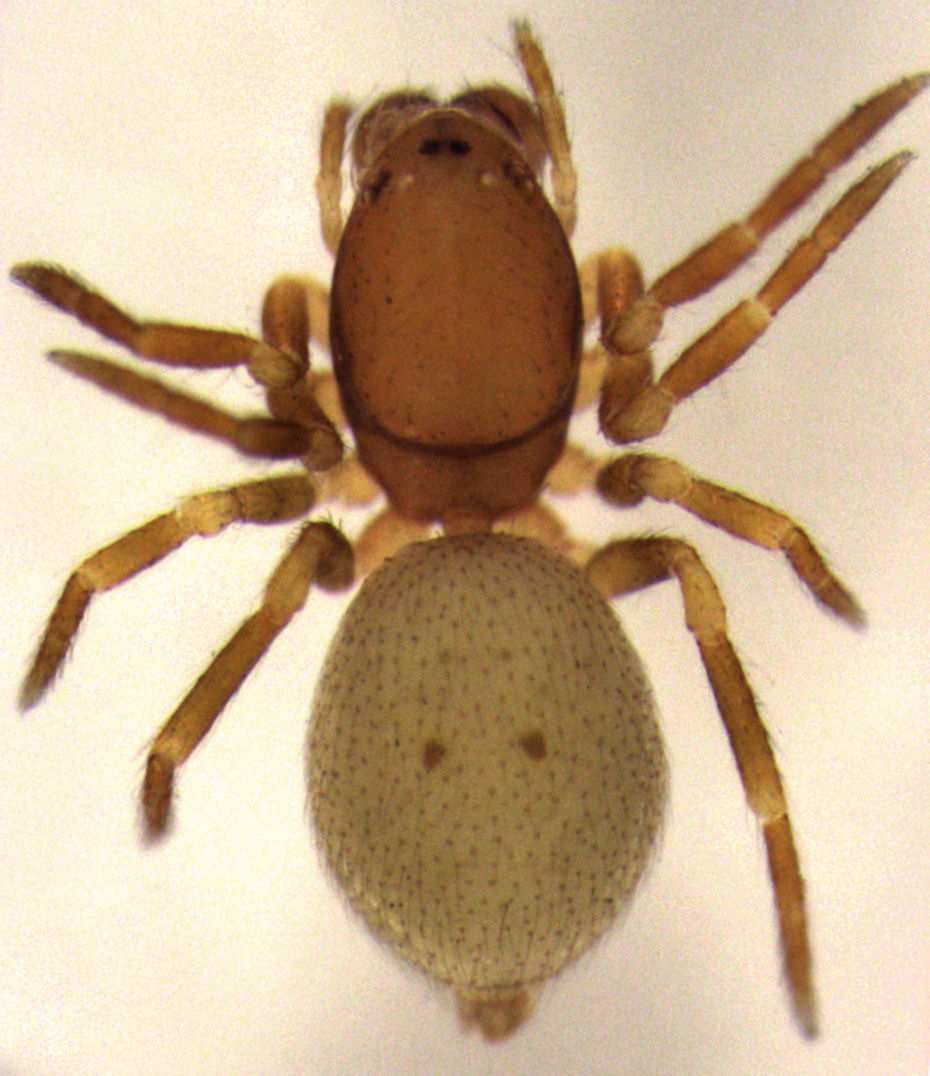
Pararchaea alba

Pararchaea Forster, 1955

- P. alba Forster, 1955 (type) — New Zealand

=== Perissopmeros ===
Perissopmeros Butler, 1932

- P. arkana (Moran, 1986) — Australia (New South Wales)
- P. castaneous Butler, 1932 (type) — Australia (New South Wales)
- P. darwini Rix, Roberts & Harvey, 2009 — Australia (Western Australia)
- P. foraminatus (Butler, 1929) — Australia (Victoria)
- P. grayi (Moran, 1986) — Australia (New South Wales)
- P. mullawerringi (Moran, 1986) — Australia (Capital Territory)
- P. quinguni (Moran, 1986) — Australia (New South Wales)

== T ==
=== Tingotingo ===
Tingotingo

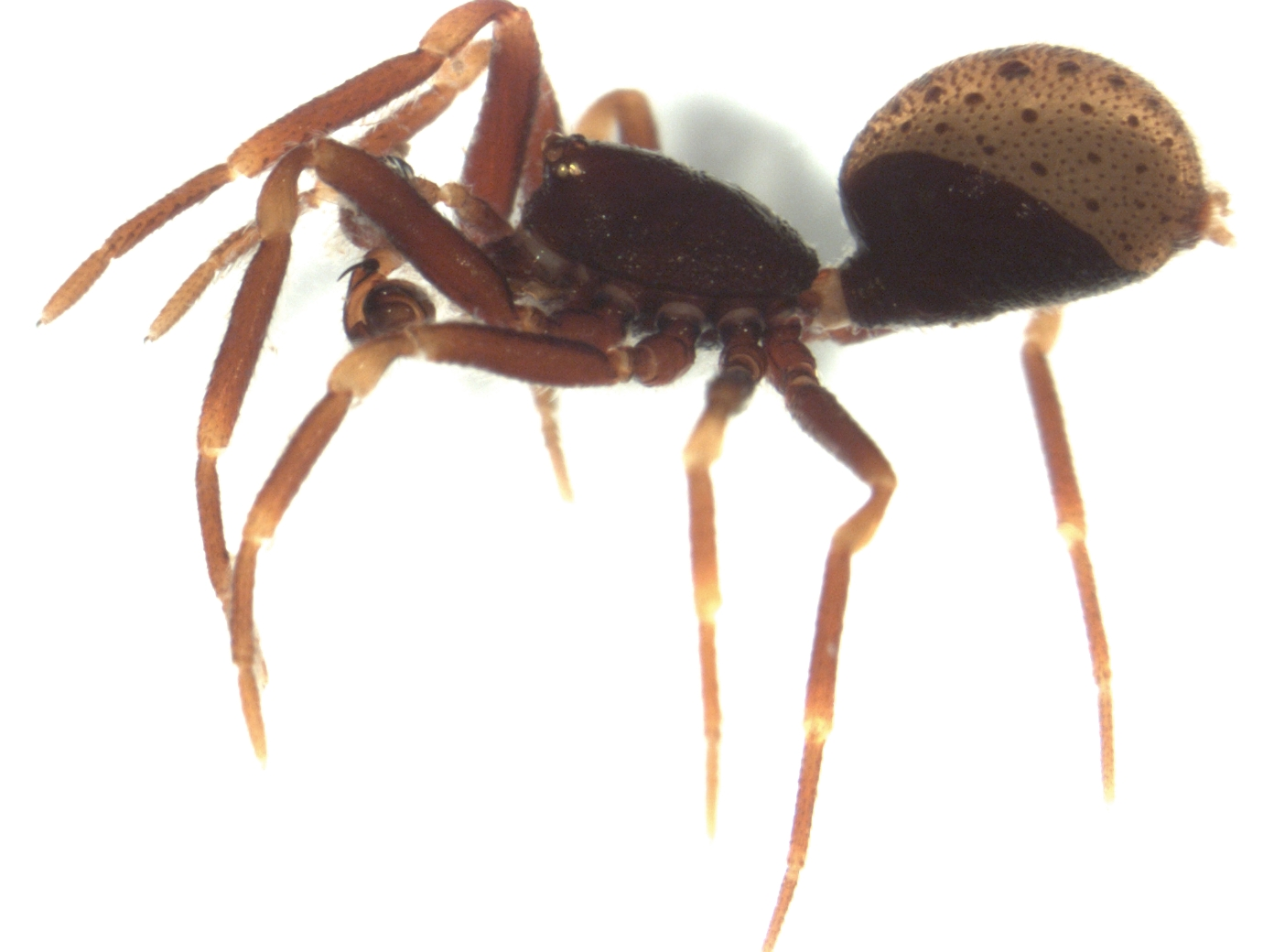
Tingotingo tokorera

Tingotingo Hormiga & Scharff, 2020

- T. aho Hormiga & Scharff, 2020 — New Zealand
- T. porotiti Hormiga & Scharff, 2020 (type) — New Zealand
- T. pouaru Hormiga & Scharff, 2020 — New Zealand
- T. tokorera Hormiga & Scharff, 2020 — New Zealand

== W ==
=== Westrarchaea ===
Westrarchaea Rix, 2006

- W. pusilla Rix, 2006 — Australia (Western Australia)
- W. sinuosa Rix, 2006 (type) — Australia (Western Australia)
- W. spinosa Rix, 2006 — Australia (Western Australia)

=== Whakamoke ===
Whakamoke

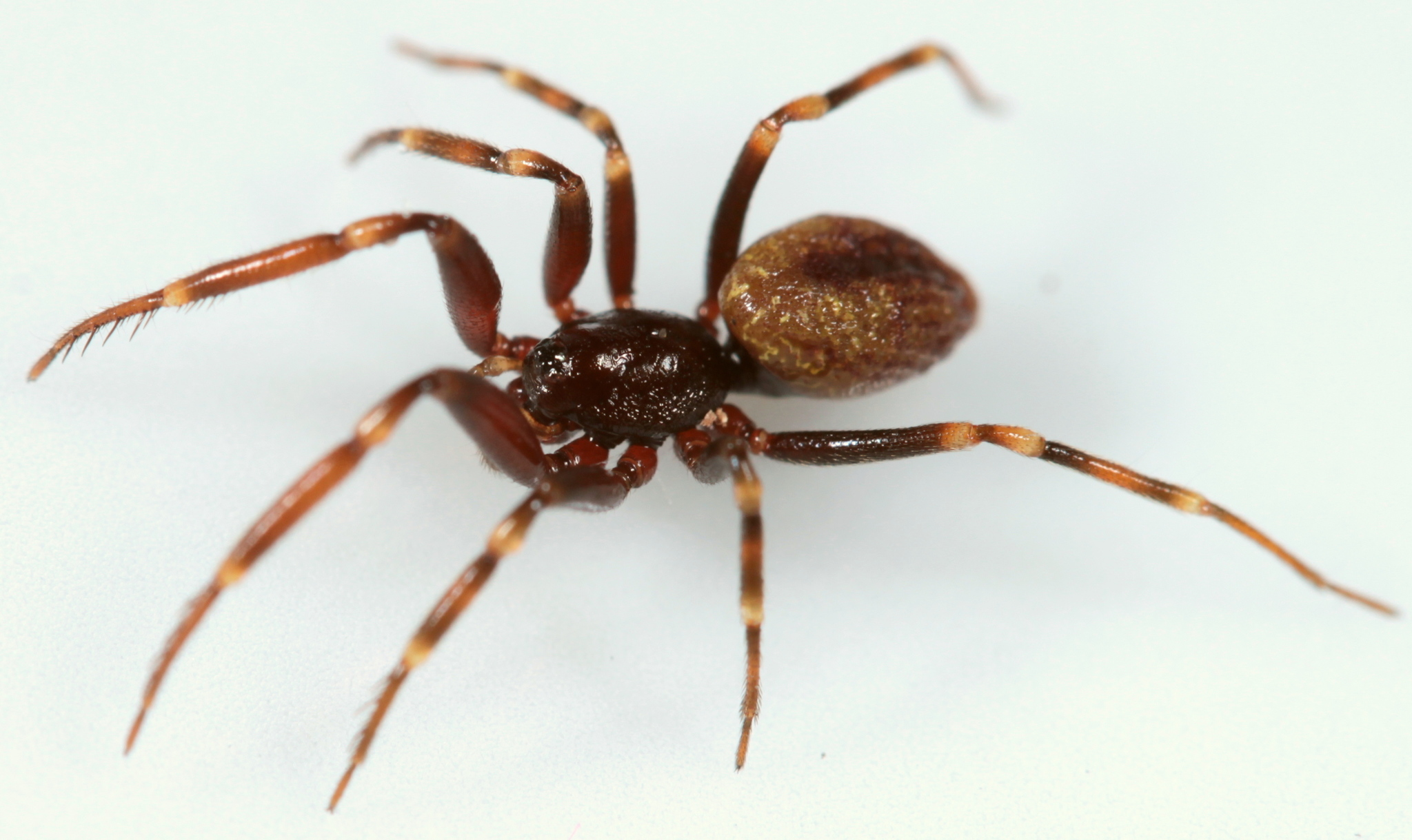
Whakamoke paoka

Whakamoke Hormiga & Scharff, 2020

- W. guacamole Hormiga & Scharff, 2020 — New Zealand
- W. heru Hormiga & Scharff, 2020 — New Zealand
- W. hunahuna Hormiga & Scharff, 2020 — New Zealand
- W. orongorongo Hormiga & Scharff, 2020 (type) — New Zealand
- W. paoka Hormiga & Scharff, 2020 — New Zealand
- W. rakiura Hormiga & Scharff, 2020 — New Zealand
- W. tarakina Hormiga & Scharff, 2020 — New Zealand
