= Cantuaria collensis =

Conservation status
- Data Deficient (NZ TCS)

Scientific classification
- Kingdom: Animalia
- Phylum: Arthropoda
- Subphylum: Chelicerata
- Class: Arachnida
- Order: Araneae
- Infraorder: Mygalomorphae
- Family: Idiopidae
- Genus: Cantuaria
- Species: C. collensis

Binomial name
- Cantuaria collensis (Todd, 1945)

Species of spider

Cantuaria collensis is a species of trapdoor spider endemic to New Zealand.

== Taxonomy ==
This species was originally described as Arbanitis collensis in 1945 by Valerie Todd from a female specimen collected in the Foveaux Strait. It was transferred to the Cantuaria genus in 1968. The holotype is stored at Otago Museum.

== Description ==
The female has been recorded at 16.8mm in length. The carapace and legs are orange brown. The abdomen is reddish brown dorsally with pale patches.

== Distribution ==
This species is only known from Bench Island in New Zealand.

== Conservation status ==
Under the New Zealand Threat Classification System, this species is listed as Data Deficient with the qualifiers of "Data Poor: Size" and "Data Poor: Trend".
