= Cantuaria stewarti =

Conservation status
- Data Deficient (NZ TCS)

Scientific classification
- Kingdom: Animalia
- Phylum: Arthropoda
- Subphylum: Chelicerata
- Class: Arachnida
- Order: Araneae
- Infraorder: Mygalomorphae
- Family: Idiopidae
- Genus: Cantuaria
- Species: C. stewarti

Binomial name
- Cantuaria stewarti (Todd, 1945)

Synonyms
- Arbanitis huttoni stewarti

Species of spider

Cantuaria stewarti is a species of trapdoor spider endemic to New Zealand.

== Taxonomy ==
This species was originally described as the subspecies Arbanitis huttoni stewarti in 1945 by Valerie Todd from female and male specimens collected on Stewart Island. This subspecies was elevated to species and transferred to the Cantuaria genus in 1968 by Ray Forster.

== Description ==
The male is recorded at 15.8mm in length. The carapace and legs are orange brown. The abdomen has a chevron pattern dorsally. The female is recorded at 13.8mm in length. The carapace and legs are orange brown. The abdomen is shaded with reddish brown on the dorsal surface.

== Distribution ==
This species is only known from Stewart Island, New Zealand.

== Conservation status ==
Under the New Zealand Threat Classification System, this species is listed as Data Deficient with the qualifiers of "Data Poor: Size" and "Data Poor: Trend".
