= Cantuaria wanganuiensis =

Conservation status
- Data Deficient (NZ TCS)

Scientific classification
- Kingdom: Animalia
- Phylum: Arthropoda
- Subphylum: Chelicerata
- Class: Arachnida
- Order: Araneae
- Infraorder: Mygalomorphae
- Family: Idiopidae
- Genus: Cantuaria
- Species: C. wanganuiensis

Binomial name
- Cantuaria wanganuiensis (Todd, 1945)

Synonyms
- Korua wanganuiensis

Species of spider

Cantuaria wanganuiensis a species of trapdoor spider endemic to New Zealand.

== Taxonomy ==
This species was described as Korua wanganuiensis in 1945 by Valerie Todd from an immature male specimen collected near Whanganui. It was transferred to the Cantuaria genus in 1968 by Ray Forster who also described the female. The holotype is stored at Otago Museum.

== Description ==
The immature male (presumed to be subadult) is recorded at 15.5mm in length. The carapace and legs are reddish brown. The abdomen has dark patches dorsally. The female is recorded at 16.5mm in length. The carapace and legs are reddish brown. The abdomen is yellow brown.

== Distribution ==
This species is only known from Whanganui, New Zealand.

== Conservation status ==
Under the New Zealand Threat Classification System, this species is listed as Data Deficient with the qualifiers of "Data Poor: Size" and "Data Poor: Trend".
