= Cantuaria marplesi =

Conservation status
- Data Deficient (NZ TCS)

Scientific classification
- Kingdom: Animalia
- Phylum: Arthropoda
- Subphylum: Chelicerata
- Class: Arachnida
- Order: Araneae
- Infraorder: Mygalomorphae
- Family: Idiopidae
- Genus: Cantuaria
- Species: C. marplesi

Binomial name
- Cantuaria marplesi (Todd, 1945)

Synonyms
- Arbanitis marplesi

Species of spider

Cantuaria marplesi is a species of trapdoor spider endemic to New Zealand.

== Taxonomy ==
This species was described in 1945 by Valerie Todd Davies from a female specimen in Duntroon. The species was transferred to the Cantuaria genus by Ray Forster in 1969. The holotype is stored at Otago Museum.

== Description ==
The female is recorded at 15mm in length. The carapace and legs are orange brown. The abdomen is grey on the dorsal surface.

== Distribution ==
This species is only known from Otago in New Zealand.

== Conservation status ==
Under the New Zealand Threat Classification System, this species is listed as Data Deficient with the qualifiers of "Data Poor: Size" and "Data Poor: Trend".
