= Malkara (disambiguation) =

Malkara, town and district in the Tekirdağ Province in Marmara region in Turkey

It may also refer to:

- Malkara (missile), a type of anti-tank missile developed by Australia and the United Kingdom
- Malkara, an aboriginal word for "shield"
- Malkara loricata, species of spiders of the Malkaridae family

== See also ==
- Malkaram, a village in Andhra Pradesh, India
- Malkera, a census town in Jharkhand, India
- Mankara, a village and gram panchayat in Palakkad district in the state of Kerala, India
