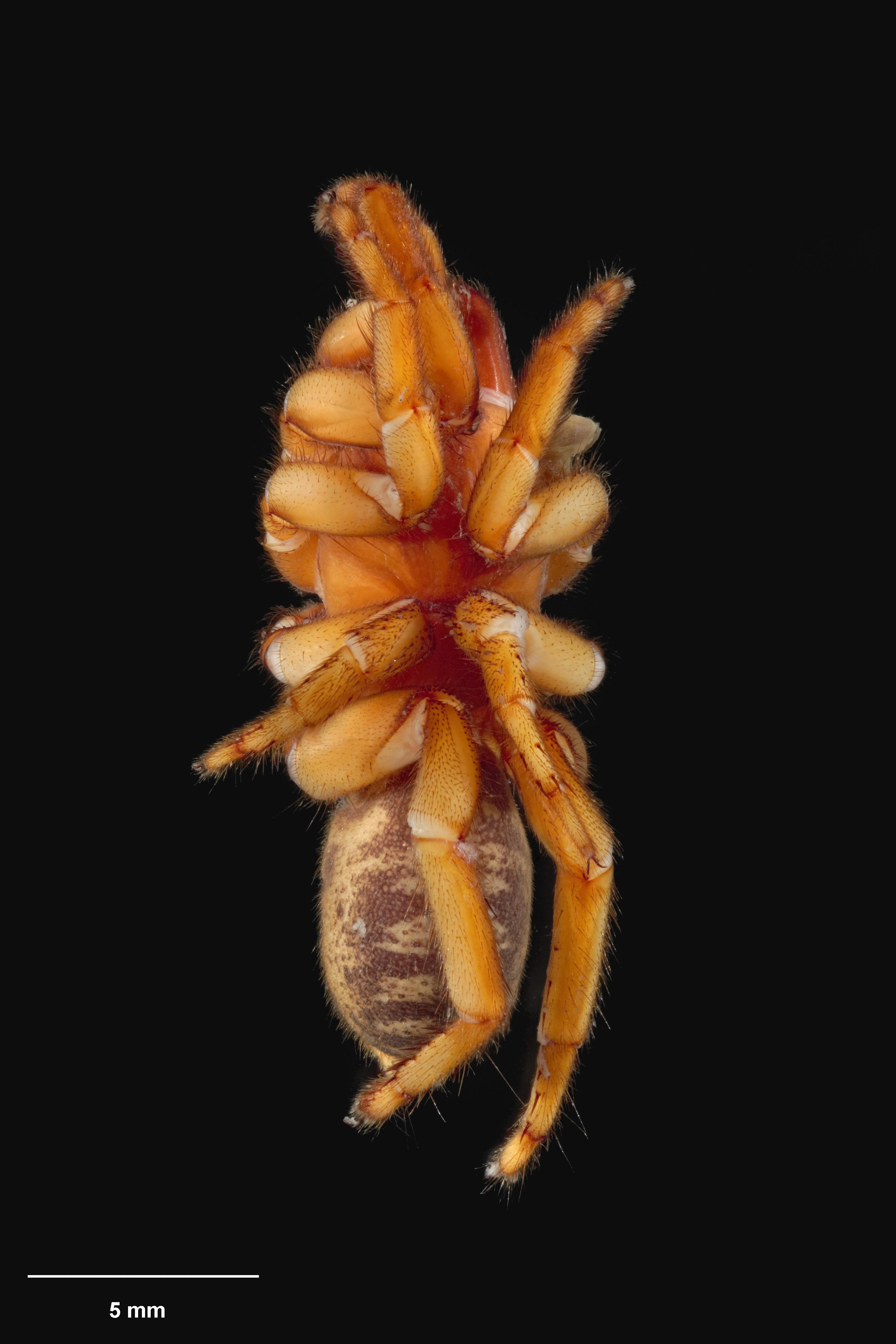

Conservation status
- Naturally Uncommon (NZ TCS)

Scientific classification
- Domain: Eukaryota
- Kingdom: Animalia
- Phylum: Arthropoda
- Subphylum: Chelicerata
- Class: Arachnida
- Order: Araneae
- Infraorder: Mygalomorphae
- Family: Idiopidae
- Genus: Cantuaria
- Species: C. abdita

Binomial name
- Cantuaria abdita Forster, 1968

= Cantuaria abdita =

Species of spider

Cantuaria abdita is a species of trapdoor spider endemic to New Zealand.

== Taxonomy ==
This species was first described by Ray Forster in 1968. The holotype specimen was collected by Richard Dell and Beverley Holloway at Hidden Island, off Stewart Island, during the 1955 Dominion Museum expedition. Presently, the species is only known from a single female specimen.

The holotype is stored at Te Papa Museum under registration number AS.000001.

== Description ==
Like most Mygalomorphae, this species has a stocky appearance. The body is over 15mm in length. The carapace and legs are orange brown whilst the abdomen is brownish with creamy blotches.

== Conservation status ==
Under the New Zealand Threat Classification System, this species is listed as Naturally Uncommon with the qualifiers of "One Location" and "Island Endemic".
