= Cantuaria catlinsensis =

Conservation status
- Data Deficient (NZ TCS)

Scientific classification
- Domain: Eukaryota
- Kingdom: Animalia
- Phylum: Arthropoda
- Subphylum: Chelicerata
- Class: Arachnida
- Order: Araneae
- Infraorder: Mygalomorphae
- Family: Idiopidae
- Genus: Cantuaria
- Species: C. catlinsensis

Binomial name
- Cantuaria catlinsensis Forster, 1968

Species of spider

Cantuaria catlinsensis is a species of trapdoor spider endemic to New Zealand.

== Taxonomy ==
This species was described in 1968 by Ray Forster from female specimens collected in Otago. The location of the holotype was not explicitly stated by the authors.

== Description ==
The female is recorded at 13.5mm in length. The carapace and legs are orange brown. The abdomen is cream coloured with reddish brown markings dorsally.

== Distribution ==
This species is only known from Papatowai in Otago, New Zealand.

== Conservation status ==
Under the New Zealand Threat Classification System, this species is listed as "Data Deficient" with the qualifiers of "Data Poor: Size", "Data Poor: Trend", "One Location".
