= Cantuaria parrotti =

Conservation status
- Data Deficient (NZ TCS)

Scientific classification
- Kingdom: Animalia
- Phylum: Arthropoda
- Subphylum: Chelicerata
- Class: Arachnida
- Order: Araneae
- Infraorder: Mygalomorphae
- Family: Idiopidae
- Genus: Cantuaria
- Species: C. parrotti

Binomial name
- Cantuaria parrotti Forster, 1968

Species of spider

Cantuaria parrotti is a species of trapdoor spider endemic to New Zealand.

== Taxonomy ==
This species was described in 1968 by Ray Forster from male and female specimens collected in Nelson. The holotype is stored at the New Zealand Arthropod Collection under registration number NZAC03014967.

== Description ==
The female is recorded at 18.3mm in length. The carapace and legs are orange brown. The abdomen is shaded with brown.

== Distribution ==
This species is only known from Nelson, New Zealand.

== Conservation status ==
Under the New Zealand Threat Classification System, this species is listed as Data Deficient with the qualifiers of "Data Poor: Size" and "Data Poor: Trend".
