= Cantuaria orepukiensis =

Conservation status
- Naturally Uncommon (NZ TCS)

Scientific classification
- Kingdom: Animalia
- Phylum: Arthropoda
- Subphylum: Chelicerata
- Class: Arachnida
- Order: Araneae
- Infraorder: Mygalomorphae
- Family: Idiopidae
- Genus: Cantuaria
- Species: C. orepukiensis

Binomial name
- Cantuaria orepukiensis Forster, 1968

Species of spider

Cantuaria orepukiensis is a species of trapdoor spider endemic to New Zealand.

== Taxonomy ==
This species was described in 1968 by Ray Forster from male and female specimens collected in Southland. The holotype is stored at Otago Museum.

== Description ==
The male is recorded at 11.8mm in length. The carapace and legs are orange brown. The abdomen with reddish brown pattern dorsally. The female is recorded at 12.1mm in length. The colours are similar to males but with more distinct abdominal patterns.

== Distribution ==
This species is only known from Southland, New Zealand.

== Conservation status ==
Under the New Zealand Threat Classification System, this species is listed as Naturally Uncommon with the qualifiers of "Data Poor: Size" and "Data Poor: Trend".
