= Cantuaria johnsi =

Conservation status
- Not Threatened (NZ TCS)

Scientific classification
- Kingdom: Animalia
- Phylum: Arthropoda
- Subphylum: Chelicerata
- Class: Arachnida
- Order: Araneae
- Infraorder: Mygalomorphae
- Family: Idiopidae
- Genus: Cantuaria
- Species: C. johnsi

Binomial name
- Cantuaria johnsi Forster, 1968

Species of spider

Cantuaria johnsi is a species of trapdoor spider endemic to New Zealand.

== Taxonomy ==
This species was described in 1968 by Ray Forster from female and male specimens collected in the Nelson region. The holotype is stored at Canterbury Museum.

== Description ==
The female is recorded at 25.2mm in length. The carapace and legs are reddish brown. The abdomen is brown coloured. The male is recorded at 15.5mm in length. The carapace and legs are reddish brown. The abdomen is dark brown.

== Distribution ==
This species is only known from Nelson, New Zealand.

== Conservation status ==
Under the New Zealand Threat Classification System, this species is listed as Not Threatened.
