= Cantuaria assimilis =

Conservation status
- Data Deficient (NZ TCS)

Scientific classification
- Kingdom: Animalia
- Phylum: Arthropoda
- Subphylum: Chelicerata
- Class: Arachnida
- Order: Araneae
- Infraorder: Mygalomorphae
- Family: Idiopidae
- Genus: Cantuaria
- Species: C. assimilis

Binomial name
- Cantuaria assimilis Forster, 1968

Species of spider

Cantuaria assimilis is a species of trapdoor spider endemic to New Zealand.

== Taxonomy ==
This species was described in 1968 by Ray Forster from a female and male specimens collected in Otago. The holotype is stored in Otago Museum.

== Description ==
The female has been recorded at 30mm in length. The carapace and legs are orangish brown. The abdomen is dark cream. The male has been recorded at 12.8mm in length. The male carapace and legs are reddish brown. The male abdomen is cream with dark dorsal patches.

== Distribution ==
This species is only known from Palmerston in Otago, New Zealand.

== Conservation status ==
Under the New Zealand Threat Classification System, this species is listed as Data Deficient with the qualifiers of "Data Poor: Size", "Data Poor: Trend", "One Location".
