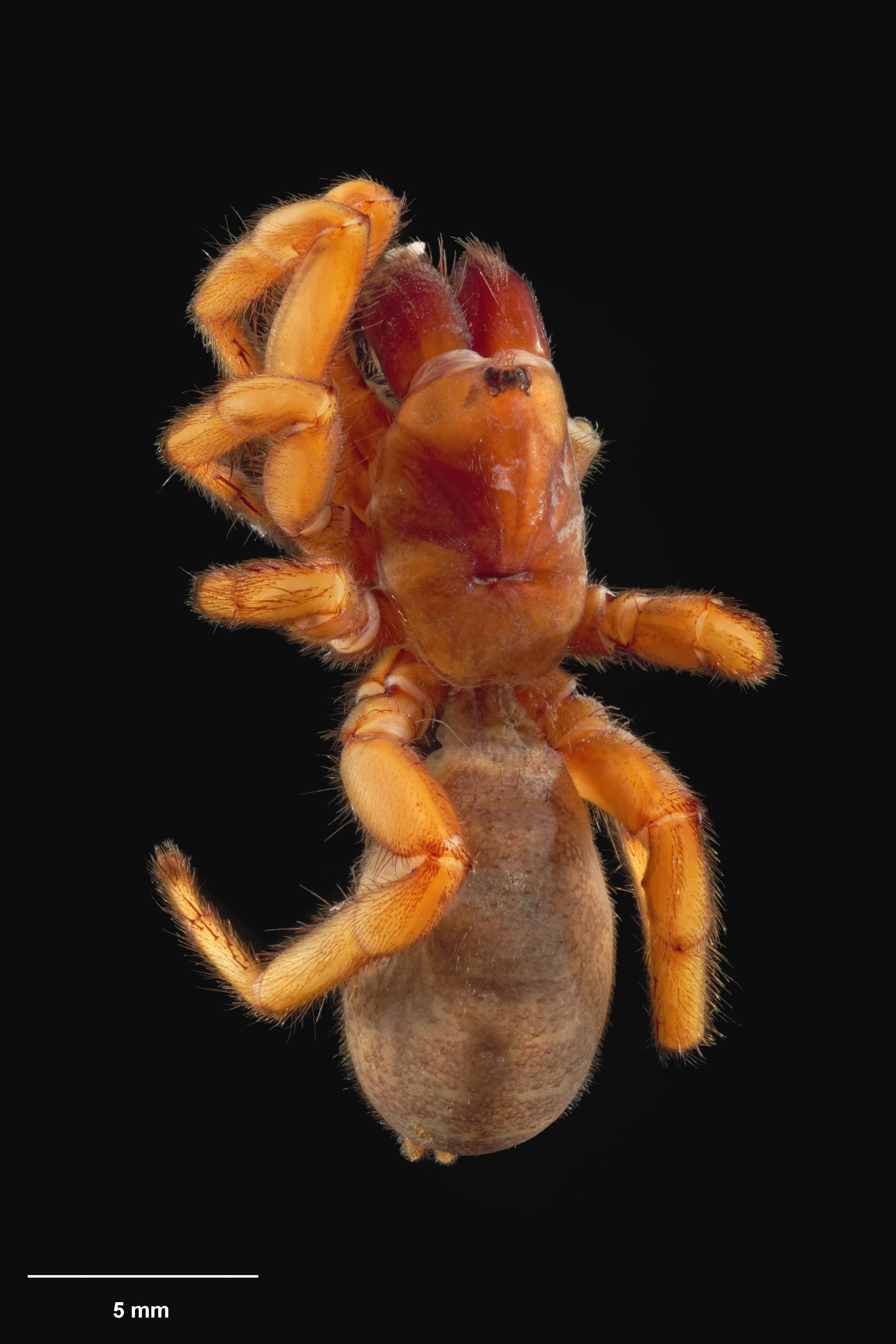

Conservation status
- Naturally Uncommon (NZ TCS)

Scientific classification
- Kingdom: Animalia
- Phylum: Arthropoda
- Subphylum: Chelicerata
- Class: Arachnida
- Order: Araneae
- Infraorder: Mygalomorphae
- Family: Idiopidae
- Genus: Cantuaria
- Species: C. delli

Binomial name
- Cantuaria delli Forster, 1968

= Cantuaria delli =

Species of spider

Cantuaria delli is a species of trapdoor spider endemic to New Zealand.

== Taxonomy ==
This species was described in 1968 by Ray Forster from a single female specimen collected on Codfish Island. The holotype is stored at Te Papa Museum under registration number AS.000021.

== Description ==
The female has been recorded at 16.5mm in length. The carapace is reddish brown while the legs are orange brown. The abdomen is shaded reddish brown.

== Distribution ==
This species is only known from Sealers Bay on Codfish Island near Stewart Island, New Zealand.

== Conservation status ==
Under the New Zealand Threat Classification System, this species is listed as Naturally Uncommon with the qualifiers of "Island Endemic" and "One Location".
