= Cantuaria napua =

Conservation status
- Naturally Uncommon (NZ TCS)

Scientific classification
- Kingdom: Animalia
- Phylum: Arthropoda
- Subphylum: Chelicerata
- Class: Arachnida
- Order: Araneae
- Infraorder: Mygalomorphae
- Family: Idiopidae
- Genus: Cantuaria
- Species: C. napua

Binomial name
- Cantuaria napua Forster, 1968

Species of spider

Cantuaria napua is an endemic New Zealand species of trapdoor spider in the family Idiopidae. It was first described by Ray Forster in 1968.

== Description ==
Forster's description gives a body length of 18.5 mm for the female and 13 mm for the male. Colouration is slightly different between sexes. In females, the carapace and legs are orange brown and chelicerae are red brown. The abdomen is cream with sparse brown patches. These are more frequent on the dorsal surface than the ventral surface. In males, the carapace, legs and chelicerae are all reddish brown, with the chelicerae a darker shade. Male abdomens are also cream coloured with brownish patches, but unlike females there are is a dark ventral band.

== Distribution ==
This species is found in the vicinity of Oamaru in New Zealand's South Island. It is one of several Cantuaria species found in that area.

== Taxonomy ==
Ray Forster described this species in 1968. After examining the type material of Cantuaria gilliesi (O. Pickard-Cambridge, 1878), Forster noted the sole male in this series is C. napua. Todd Davies established a neotype for C. gilliesi but Forster noted it is conspecific with C. napua and selected it to be the holotype for his new species. This specimen, along with an allotype male, are held at Otago Museum.

== Conservation Status ==
According to the New Zealand Threat Classification System, Cantuaria napua is classed as At Risk (Naturally Uncommon)
