= Cantuaria toddae =

Conservation status
- Data Deficient (NZ TCS)

Scientific classification
- Kingdom: Animalia
- Phylum: Arthropoda
- Subphylum: Chelicerata
- Class: Arachnida
- Order: Araneae
- Infraorder: Mygalomorphae
- Family: Idiopidae
- Genus: Cantuaria
- Species: C. toddae

Binomial name
- Cantuaria toddae Forster, 1968

Species of spider

Cantuaria toddae is a species of trapdoor spider endemic to New Zealand.

== Taxonomy ==
This species was described as Cantuaria toddi in 1968 by Ray Forster from male and female specimens collected in Central Otago. The species name was changed to Cantuaria toddae in 1983. The holotype is stored at Otago Museum.

== Description ==
The male is recorded at 11.3mm in length. The carapace and legs are yellow brown. The abdomen is creamy yellow with faint markings dorsally. The female is recorded at 16mm in length. The carapace and legs are yellow brown. The abdomen is pale brown with faint markings dorsally.

== Distribution ==
This species is only known from Central Otago, New Zealand.

== Conservation status ==
Under the New Zealand Threat Classification System, this species is listed as Data Deficient with the qualifiers of "Data Poor: Size", "Data Poor: Trend" and "One Location".
