= Cantuaria huttoni =

Conservation status
- Not Threatened (NZ TCS)

Scientific classification
- Kingdom: Animalia
- Phylum: Arthropoda
- Subphylum: Chelicerata
- Class: Arachnida
- Order: Araneae
- Infraorder: Mygalomorphae
- Family: Idiopidae
- Genus: Cantuaria
- Species: C. huttoni

Binomial name
- Cantuaria huttoni (Pickard-Cambridge, 1880)

Synonyms
- Arbanitis huttonii Arbanitis huttoni

Species of spider

Cantuaria huttoni is a species of trapdoor spider endemic to New Zealand.

== Taxonomy ==
This species was first described in 1880 by Octavius Pickard-Cambridge as Arbanitis huttonii. It was transferred to the Cantuaria genus by Ray Forster 1968. Both sexes have been described. The holotype is stored at Oxford University Museum of Natural History.

== Description ==
The male has been recorded at 9.8mm in length. The carapace and legs are orange-brown. The abdomen is cream colored with chevrons dorsally. The female has been recorded at 12.5mm in length. The carapace and legs are reddish brown. The abdomen is cream, with dorsal chevron patterns.

== Distribution ==
This species is only known from Dunedin, New Zealand.

== Conservation status ==
Under the New Zealand Threat Classification System, this species is listed as Not Threatened.
