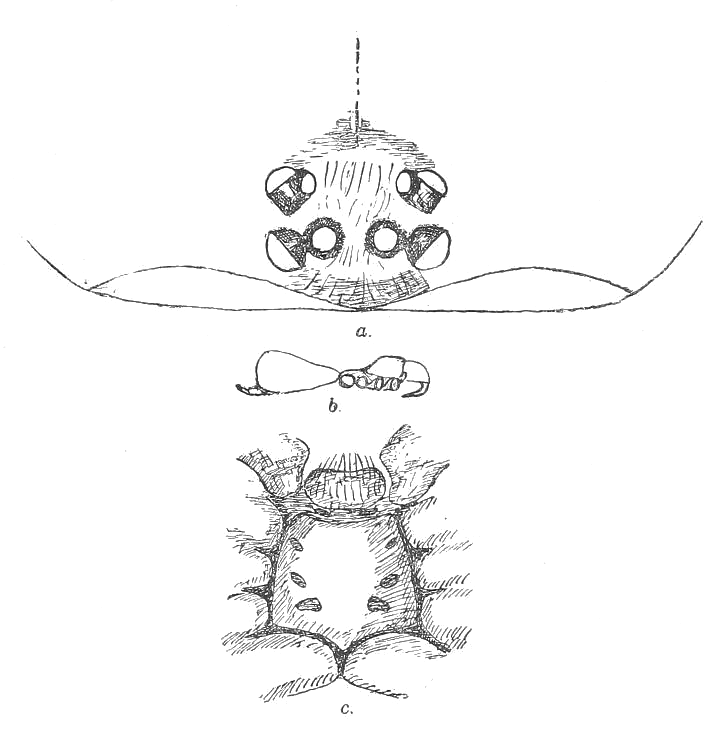
- Eyes (a), body (b), and underside (c)

Scientific classification
- Kingdom: Animalia
- Phylum: Arthropoda
- Subphylum: Chelicerata
- Class: Arachnida
- Order: Araneae
- Infraorder: Mygalomorphae
- Family: Idiopidae
- Genus: Cantuaria
- Species: C. dendyi

Binomial name
- Cantuaria dendyi (Hogg, 1901)

Synonyms
- Maoriana dendyi Hogg, 1901; Arbanitis dendyi (Hogg, 1901); Misgolas dendyi (Hogg, 1901)

= Cantuaria dendyi =

Species of spider

Cantuaria dendyi is a species of trapdoor spider in the family Idiopidae. It can be found in the South Island of New Zealand and is limited to the Christchurch and Banks Peninsula area.

== Taxonomy ==
British amateur arachnologist Henry Roughton Hogg described this species in 1901 as Maoriana dendyi from a specimen collected in Christchurch and sent to him by Professor Arthur Dendy. A year later, Hogg discovered that the genus name Maoriana had already been allocated to a genus of mollusc, so he renamed the species Cantuaria dendyi. The genus name recalls Canterbury Province, the origin of the specimen. Other names for the genus have been Misgolas and Arbanitis. Valerie Todd felt the differences that Hogg had used to place C. dendyi in a new genus were not enough to separate it from the genus Arbanitis, so she reclassified it as Arbanitis dendyi. Additionally, the family Idiopidae was previously considered part of the Ctenizidae.

The first spiders of this genus to be found, Cantuaria dendyi is the type species of the genus.

== Description ==
Cantuaria dendyi is one of over 40 species of Cantuaria recognised today. The main identifying feature of this genus is the presence of a rastellum. This is a set of strong spines used for digging when forming burrows, and are attached to the front of the chelicerae (fang-like mouth pieces). Another way to determine Cantuaria is the presence of only 4 small spinnerets for spinning silk. They are large creatures and the medium size is approximately 2.3 cm with the largest growing up to 3 cm long. However, this size is measured from eye ridge to the end of the abdomen. Therefore, nothing beyond the eye ridge such as legs and fang bases are accounted for and consequently, these spiders are potentially bigger than measurements state. C. dendyi have an abdomen that is cream in colour, with a number of small black patches, which leave three broken pale chevrons on the rear of the abdomen. Both male and females individuals display this chevron pattern on the abdomen, however is not as clear on males as on females. Legs are dark orange brown, as are the palps (segmented appendages near the mouth) of this species Legs differ between sexes. Thick scopula (dense tufts of hair) covers the tarsus and anterior half of the metatarsus of the first two pairs of legs on females, whereas males have thick scopula on the ventral surfaces of both the tarsus and metatarsus on the first two pairs of legs

== Distribution and habitat ==
Cantuaria are endemic to New Zealand, having been present for 85 million years since New Zealand split from Gondwana. They are predominantly found throughout the South Island of New Zealand although they have been known to reside in the lower part of the North Island up to the Whanganui region.

New Zealand's true trapdoor spiders (Idiopidae) prefer grassland regions and have adapted to the change in landscape from human presence and the increase in agriculture. Highest numbers can be found along fence lines and beside roads in self-made burrows with thin lids and the average depth of these burrows ranges between 15 and 30 centimeters. There are exceptions to this as some species such as C. huttoni, can be found on forest floors, however, these spiders usually have an open burrow as opposed to having a “trapdoor”.

Cantuaria are masters of camouflage and accordingly, they are very hard to find. They incorporate nearby material into the silk so that the trapdoors look like the surrounding environment. Once their burrow is built, they do not wander far and consequently, species are scattered in distribution. Cantuaria dendyi is limited to the Christchurch and Banks Peninsula area in the South Island of New Zealand

== Life cycle and phenology ==
One of the most distinguishing characteristics of the Cantuaria dendyi, like other Cantuaria, is that it lives its life in a burrow under the ground. The burrow of C. dendyi varies from 4-8 inches (about 10–20 cm) long and is covered by a trapdoor. These spiders will live their entire life in the burrow and are known to be extremely sedentary. When males are mature enough, they undergo their final moult and abandon their homes to find a mate. They leave in early winter, anytime between April and June, and some will not eat once they leave. Females remain in the burrow their entire life only exiting in the case of an emergency. Not much is known about the mating sequence of Cantuaria, but from periodic observations some behaviours can be described. The male will approach the female's burrow with his front legs straight out, vibrating them at regular intervals on the door This drumming could signal the female of his presence, but it is unknown if she lets him in or if he lifts up the trapdoor himself. An interesting fact about Cantuaria is that the offspring will live in the mother's burrow for roughly 18 months until the spiderling is ready to adventure on its own. Vikki Smith, a PhD candidate at Lincoln University described mother Cantuaria being protective of their children. During one of her observations when she placed a Caribid beetles in the burrow of a Cantuaria and her spiderling, the spiderling ran out while the mother stayed behind to fight the beetle. Vikki later pulled out only the leg of the beetle; the mother had won. Cantuaria are long-lived creatures that can survive for up to 20 years. Cantuaria seem to be designed for a long and sustained life, with a slow metabolism, sedentary life, and spending their time at the bottom of their burrow only opening the trapdoor to catch an insect for food.

== Diet and foraging ==
Cantuaria are able to use their burrows to their advantage when it comes to eating. Not all Cantuaria have trapdoors, but C. dendyi are one of the species with a lid to their burrow. The spider sit in its hole, with the trapdoor slightly open, and when it feels the vibration of a passing insect, the Cantuaria jumps out and grabs it. The spider lunges out of its tunnel, above the insect, so it is able to catch its food using its fangs on the way back down. Unlike some spiders, Cantuaria do not wrap their prey in silk, but drag the victim into the depths of the burrow, with the trapdoor closing overhead. These spiders are carnivorous and their diet includes whatever passing victim gets caught, most likely some sort of insect. At the bottom of these spider's burrows, fragments of beetle remains have been found. Cantuaria must eat their prey in the burrow and it is important that the spider never jumps so far out from the burrow that the trapdoor closes behind it, because the spider will then be locked out. From observation, when Cantuaria leap out of their burrow to catch prey, they always grasp onto the edge of the hole with their hind leg to prevent the door from closing.

Researchers have been successful at luring and capturing Cantuaria using a tethered mealworm (Tenebrio molitor) beetle, which is quicker and causes much less environmental damage than digging the spider out of its burrow.

These spiders are very sedentary, usually only sitting in their burrows waiting for a passing victim. They operate in a constant low temperature because they are underground, and they live for about 20 years. With these factors we can assume Cantuaria might have a low metabolic rate. With a low metabolic rate and a carnivorous diet, all this spider needs to do is wait for an unsuspecting victim to pass its burrow so that it can jump out and find its next meal.

== Predators, parasites and diseases ==
Even though Cantuaria seem to be safe living their life underground, there are always predators who will find a way to surpass that obstacle and feed on the spider. The greatest of these enemies appears to be New Zealand's largest black hunting wasp, Priocnemis monachus. Cantuaria are rather large spiders, so it makes sense that a large wasp would seek out a hefty meal for their growing larvae. Species of Cantuaria that live in their burrow without a trapdoor are most at risk, but this wasp is known to be strong enough to pull the lid open or bite clean through it, which puts C. dendyi at risk. The wasps have also been known to pretend to be an insect at the entrance and when the spider attacks, the wasp immediately grasps it. Some wasps also proceed to take over the spider's burrow, opening and closing the trapdoor as it pleases.

New Zealand entomologist Anthony Harris has observed interactions between Priocnemis monachus and Cantuaria. He recorded that a wasp will find a trapdoor spider outside their burrow and stalk it. The spider will flee but as it turns to face the wasp (rearing up as it does so) a struggle ensues. The wasp will sting the spider several times until the spider collapses, although still alive. The wasp will then drag the body of the spider back to its already prepared nest. The spider is placed in a cell of the nest in which a wasp will lay an egg. The larva that develops will start feeding on the inert but still living body of the spider. Only at the end will the wasp larva eat the vital organs of the spider, which finally dies.

When reviewing Cantuaria, Valerie Todd at the University of Otago, noted many species of this genus seem to be parasitised by mites. The mites were most commonly found clinging to the cephalothorax and were common on C. dendyi. Vikki Smith also found nematodes, or parasitic worms, inside of Cantuaria that seemed to have drowned. It is possible these spiders tried to escape the worm by leaving their burrow, and in doing so they put themselves at risk and got caught in water. Parasites and predators still have found a way to attach Cantuaria. Since many spiders take food up in liquid state, they are not likely to have internal parasites, other than a specific nematode species. Mites, however commonly parasitise this species and are found on the anterior part of the two sections that the spider in divided into (cephalothorax). Several species of Cantuaria have been found carrying the parasite nematode species Aranimermis giganteus in the abdomen, C. dendyi may also carry this parasitic nematode.

== Distinguishing traits ==
Cantuaria is amongst the few spider genera whose members will look after offspring until they are able to build a burrow for themselves. Another trait of Cantuaria dendyi is their noncannibalistic habits. Males and females were kept together in a box and there were no noted loss of limbs throughout this time. Some were huddled together under a grass sod; the weaker died first in this study. Cantuaria are long-lived creatures that can survive up to 20 years.
