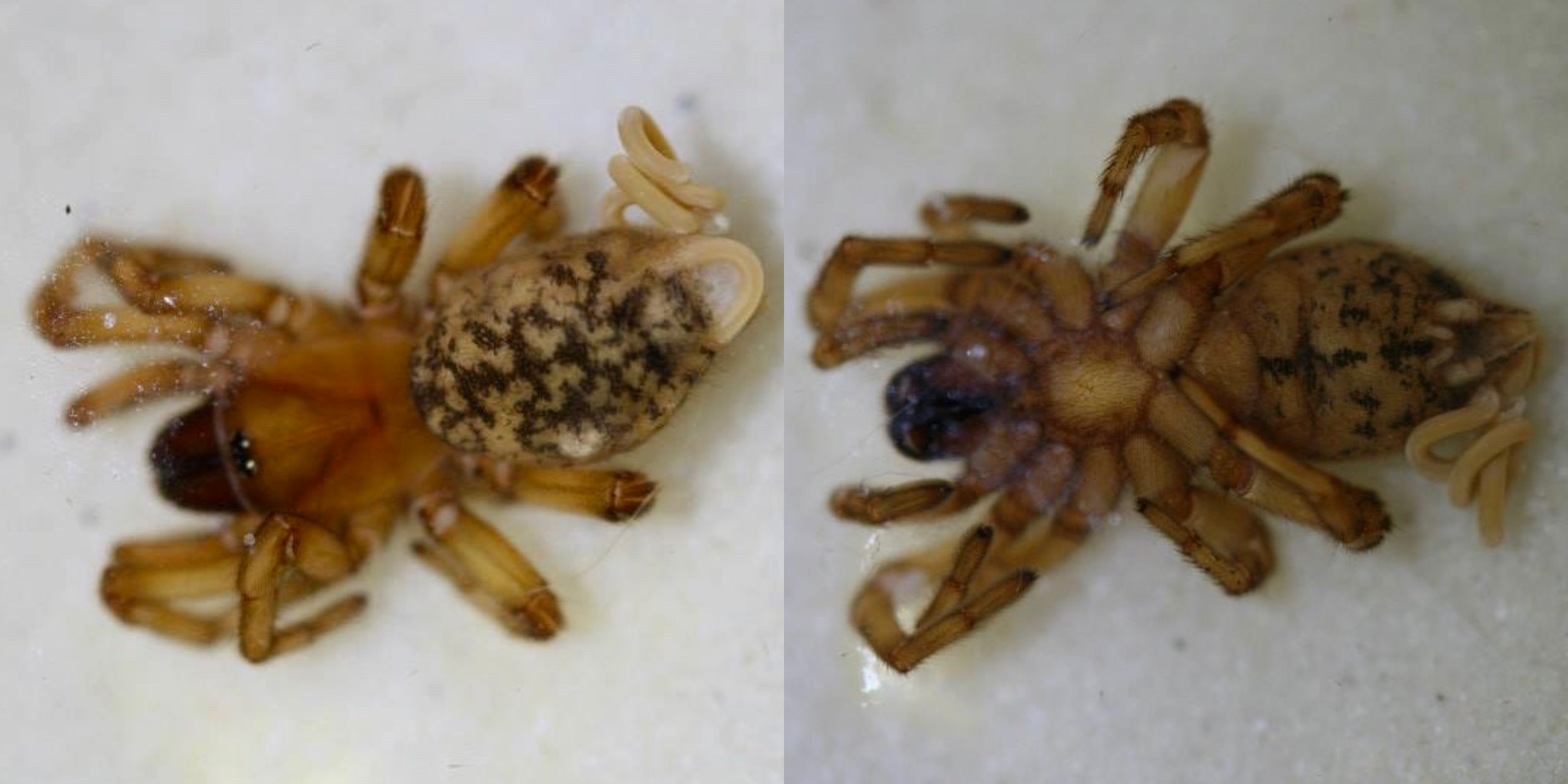

Scientific classification
- Kingdom: Animalia
- Phylum: Arthropoda
- Subphylum: Chelicerata
- Class: Arachnida
- Order: Araneae
- Infraorder: Mygalomorphae
- Family: Idiopidae
- Genus: Cantuaria
- Species: C. borealis

Binomial name
- Cantuaria borealis Forster, 1968

= Cantuaria borealis =

Species of spider

Cantuaria borealis is a species of trapdoor spider endemic to New Zealand.

== Description ==
Cantuaria borealis are large, stocky spiders that range in colour of various shades of brown, ranging from orange, red and yellow, to olive and purple tones. Cantuaria borealis have eight eyes, located in the centre of their head, and they can be arranged in either two or three rows. Their body size ranges from 8-33mm. Cantuaria borealis are sexually dimorphic, with the male spiders looking very similar to the female spiders until their last moult, where they emerge darker in colour and stockier in size. Male spiders have an obvious palpal organ, and female spiders have internal genitalia.

== Distribution ==
=== New Zealand range ===
Cantuaria borealis are located throughout the South Island of New Zealand, with concentrations being found in Canterbury, the Banks Peninsula and the West Coast region. Due to limited migration techniques, each separate population of the spider tends to be a different species as they only walk up to a few meters before creating their own burrow.

=== Habitat preferences ===
Cantuaria borealis display habitat selection modelling other idiopid as they occupy a fossorial niche. A fossorial niche refers to an organism that lives most of its life underground, emerging only to mate, migrate or strike prey. Burrows are dug 30–40 cm deep with the deepest burrow recorded at 49 cm.

== Life cycle/phenology ==
Cantuaria borealis mature slowly and have a long life cycle, with the females living up to 20 years. Few eggs are laid each year, and a closely related Cantuaria species (Cantuaria huttoni) was found to have only 18-20 eggs in the egg sac. Offspring could not independently manoeuvre until they were around one month old. The female parent invests between 6–18 months to raise the offspring until they are mature enough to build their own burrows. As mentioned earlier, the Cantuaria borealis species are fossorial, cluster forming spiders, meaning that they build their burrows in close proximity to one another. Male spiders become vagrant, and leave their burrows to look for a female mate during autumn and winter months. Females rarely ever leave their burrows and live their whole life cycle underground, making the burrow wider and longer as they grow.

== Diet and foraging ==
Cantuaria borealis are carnivorous and eat invertebrates including beetles and snails. They have adapted an efficient technique to hunt snails. Just before the snail retreats into its protective shell, the spider pierces the snails soft tissue, preventing it from retreating. After a while, the snail gets fatigued and can no longer resist the spiders grasp and eventually gets digested. Cantuaria borealis, like other spiders, eat only liquid food. The spider traps its prey, and injects its saliva in to the organism. The saliva contains enzymes that liquify the tissue, and the spider then pumps the liquid in to its body, using its muscular abdomen. Hard parts that are undigestible, are either dropped into the burrow to rest in the mittle, or tossed out the trapdoor onto the ground surface. Cantuaria borealis have been observed to trap only live food, with little interest being shown in dead invertebrates that it would usually eat. Trapdoor spiders in New Zealand do not have silk trip lines, but instead sense the vibrations of the prey outside the trapdoor. The spiders have been observed, perching just behind the trap door, ready to strike. Occasionally the spider will leave the burrow completely to chase the prey, however this wasn’t the preferred behaviour.

== Predators, parasites, and diseases ==
Common predators of Cantuaria borealis are bird, rodents and reptiles, and they are potential hosts for parasites, nematodes and fungi. Another common predator is the Priochemis (Trichocuryus) monachus also known as New Zealand’s largest pompilid wasp. The wasp hunts the spider to feed to its larva and will prey on juvenile and adult spiders. The wasp stalks the spider until the spider engages. Once spider has engaged with the wasp, the wasp will sting the spider, paralysing it. The spider is then dragged back to the wasps nest where the larva eat the spider, waiting until the end to eat its vital organs and essentially killing the spider. The spider is mainly targeted for its large size and when it is in the open its vulnerability.

Cantuaria borealis are parasitised by Aranimermis gigunteus, which is a nematode, from the mermithid family. Aranimermis gigunteus lives inside female Cantuaria borealis, and no nematodes were found in male spiders. This is thought to be because they require a stable environment, which is found within the female spiders who do not leave their burrow throughout their life cycle, of around 20 years. It is also understood that Aranimermis gigunteus has a long life cycle, and it cannot complete this cycle within the male spiders lifetime of 1–3 years. Almost all female spiders were infected and having more than one parasite was common. In spiders with only one parasite, the sex of the nematode was always female, and for spiders with more than two, the gender was always male. Seven nematodes was the most nematodes found within one spider. These Aranimermis gigunteus parasites have been shown to be parasitized themselves, with cysts thought to be caused by a sporozoan protozoan parasite.

== Cultural uses ==
Trapdoor spiders, particularly Cantuaria borealis species have been used for pest control in grasslands as they are effective predators of large invertebrates. The value of trapdoor spiders on farmland has been recognised before, and it has been noted that paddocks that had trapdoors, has less issues with grass grub.
