= Cantuaria myersi =

Conservation status
- Not Threatened (NZ TCS)

Scientific classification
- Kingdom: Animalia
- Phylum: Arthropoda
- Subphylum: Chelicerata
- Class: Arachnida
- Order: Araneae
- Infraorder: Mygalomorphae
- Family: Idiopidae
- Genus: Cantuaria
- Species: C. myersi

Binomial name
- Cantuaria myersi Forster, 1968

Species of spider

Cantuaria myersi is a species of trapdoor spider endemic to New Zealand.

== Taxonomy ==
This species was described in 1968 by Ray Forster from male and females specimens from Wellington. The holotype is stored at Otago Museum.

== Description ==
The male is recorded at 11mm in length. The carapace and legs are reddish brown. The abdomen is shaded on the dorsal surface with pale patches. The female is recorded at 19.5mm in length. The colours are similar to males.

== Distribution ==
This species is only known from Wellington, New Zealand.

== Conservation status ==
Under the New Zealand Threat Classification System, this species is listed as Not Threatened.
