= Cantuaria insulana =

Conservation status
- Naturally Uncommon (NZ TCS)

Scientific classification
- Kingdom: Animalia
- Phylum: Arthropoda
- Subphylum: Chelicerata
- Class: Arachnida
- Order: Araneae
- Infraorder: Mygalomorphae
- Family: Idiopidae
- Genus: Cantuaria
- Species: C. insulana

Binomial name
- Cantuaria insulana Forster, 1968

Species of spider

Cantuaria insulana is a species of trapdoor spider endemic to New Zealand.

== Taxonomy ==
This species was described in 1968 by Ray Forster from female specimens collected in Marlborough Sounds.

== Description ==
The female is recorded at 17.3mm in length. The carapace and legs are orange brown. The abdomen is cream with dorsal bands.

== Distribution ==
This species is only known from D'Urville Island in New Zealand.

== Conservation status ==
Under the New Zealand Threat Classification System, this species is listed as Naturally Uncommon with the qualifiers of "Island Endemic" and "One Location".
