= Cantuaria vellosa =

Conservation status
- Data Deficient (NZ TCS)

Scientific classification
- Kingdom: Animalia
- Phylum: Arthropoda
- Subphylum: Chelicerata
- Class: Arachnida
- Order: Araneae
- Infraorder: Mygalomorphae
- Family: Idiopidae
- Genus: Cantuaria
- Species: C. vellosa

Binomial name
- Cantuaria vellosa Forster, 1968

Species of spider

Cantuaria vellosa is a species of trapdoor spider endemic to New Zealand.

== Taxonomy ==
This species was described in 1968 by Ray Forster from female and male specimens collected in Otago. The holotype is stored in Otago Museum. The holotype was found in a cliff near sea level.

== Description ==
The female is recorded at 24mm in length. The carapace and legs are reddish brown. The abdomen is orange brown with brown shading dorsally. The male is recorded at 20.1mm in length. The carapace and legs are dark brown. The abdomen is creamy brown laterally and ventrally.

== Distribution ==
This species is only known from Otago, New Zealand.

== Conservation status ==
Under the New Zealand Threat Classification System, this species is listed as Data Deficient with the qualifiers of "Data Poor: Size", "Data Poor: Trend" and "One Location".
