= Cantuaria sylvatica =

Conservation status
- Data Deficient (NZ TCS)

Scientific classification
- Kingdom: Animalia
- Phylum: Arthropoda
- Subphylum: Chelicerata
- Class: Arachnida
- Order: Araneae
- Infraorder: Mygalomorphae
- Family: Idiopidae
- Genus: Cantuaria
- Species: C. sylvatica

Binomial name
- Cantuaria sylvatica Forster, 1968

Species of spider

Cantuaria sylvatica is a species of trapdoor spider endemic to New Zealand.

== Taxonomy ==
This species was described in 1968 by Ray Forster from female specimens collected in Fiordland. The holotype is stored at Otago Museum.

== Description ==
The female is recorded at 12.8mm in length. The carapace is reddish brown. The legs are orange brown. The abdomen is shaded reddish brown dorsally.

== Distribution ==
This species is only known from Fiordland, New Zealand.

== Conservation status ==
Under the New Zealand Threat Classification System, this species is listed as Data Deficient with the qualifiers of "Data Poor: Size" and "Data Poor: Trend".
