= Cantuaria maxima =

Conservation status
- Data Deficient (NZ TCS)

Scientific classification
- Kingdom: Animalia
- Phylum: Arthropoda
- Subphylum: Chelicerata
- Class: Arachnida
- Order: Araneae
- Infraorder: Mygalomorphae
- Family: Idiopidae
- Genus: Cantuaria
- Species: C. maxima

Binomial name
- Cantuaria maxima Forster, 1968

Species of spider

Cantuaria maxima is a species of trapdoor spider endemic to New Zealand.

== Taxonomy ==
This species was described in 1968 by Ray Forster from a single female specimen collected in Hakataramea. The holotype is stored at Otago Museum.

== Description ==
The female is recorded at 25m in length. The carapace and legs are reddish brown. The abdomen is dark brown.

== Distribution ==
This species is only known from Hakataramea in Otago, New Zealand.

== Conservation status ==
Under the New Zealand Threat Classification System, this species is listed as Data Deficient with the qualifiers of "Data Poor: Size", "Data Poor: Trend" and "One Location".
