= Cantuaria magna =

Conservation status
- Data Deficient (NZ TCS)

Scientific classification
- Kingdom: Animalia
- Phylum: Arthropoda
- Subphylum: Chelicerata
- Class: Arachnida
- Order: Araneae
- Infraorder: Mygalomorphae
- Family: Idiopidae
- Genus: Cantuaria
- Species: C. magna

Binomial name
- Cantuaria magna Forster, 1968

Species of spider

Cantuaria magna is a species of trapdoor spider endemic to New Zealand.

== Taxonomy ==
This species was described in 1968 by Ray Forster from male and female specimens collected in Westland. The holotype is stored at Otago Museum.

== Description ==
The male is recorded at 19mm in length. The carapace and legs are dark reddish brown. The abdomen is dark brown with a pale area dorsally. The female is recorded at 28.5mm in length. The female is coloured like the male, but has extra pale areas on the abdomen.

== Distribution ==
This species is only known Greymouth in Westland, New Zealand.

== Conservation status ==
Under the New Zealand Threat Classification System, this species is listed as Data Deficient with the qualifiers of "Data Poor: Size" and "Data Poor: Trend".
