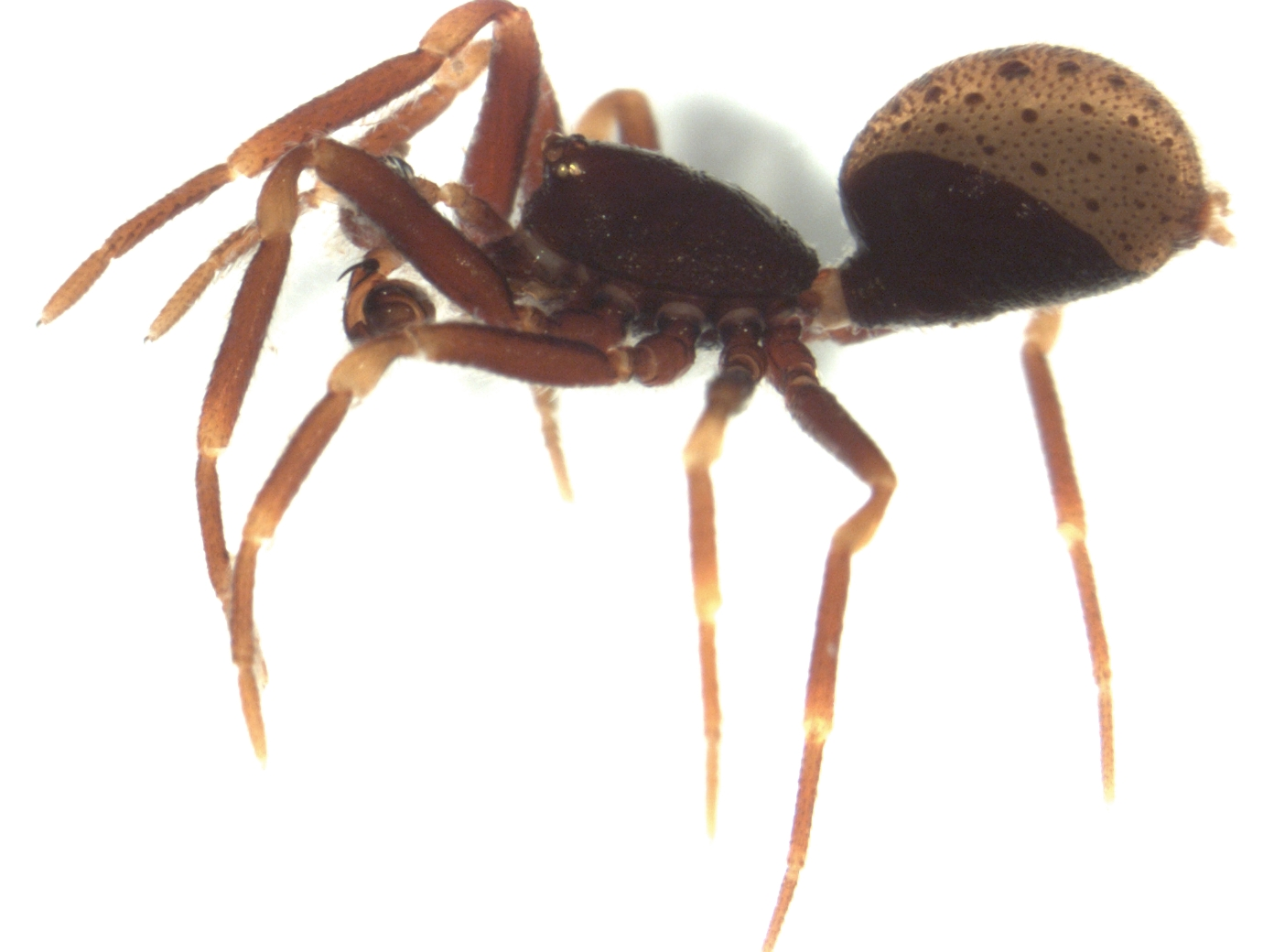

Scientific classification
- Domain: Eukaryota
- Kingdom: Animalia
- Phylum: Arthropoda
- Subphylum: Chelicerata
- Class: Arachnida
- Order: Araneae
- Infraorder: Araneomorphae
- Family: Malkaridae
- Genus: Malkara; Davies, 1980
- Species: M. loricata

Binomial name
- Malkara loricata Davies, 1980

= Malkara loricata =

Species of spider

Malkara loricata is a species of spiders in the family Malkaridae. It was first described in 1980 by Valerie Todd Davies. As of 2017, it is the sole species in the genus Malkara. It is found in Queensland.
