= Cantuaria mestoni =

Scientific classification
- Kingdom: Animalia
- Phylum: Arthropoda
- Subphylum: Chelicerata
- Class: Arachnida
- Order: Araneae
- Infraorder: Mygalomorphae
- Family: Idiopidae
- Genus: Cantuaria
- Species: C. mestoni

Binomial name
- Cantuaria mestoni (Hickman, 1928)

Synonyms
- Arbanitis mestoni Hickman, 1928; Misgolas mestoni (Hickman, 1928)

Species of spider

Cantuaria mestoni is a species of mygalomorph spider in the Idiopidae family. It is endemic to Australia. It was described in 1928 by Australian arachnologist Vernon Victor Hickman.

== Distribution and habitat ==
The species occurs in Tasmania. The type locality is Woodsdale.

== Behaviour ==
The spiders are fossorial, terrestrial predators which construct burrows without trapdoors in grassy sites.
