= Cantuaria gilliesi =

Conservation status
- Data Deficient (NZ TCS)

Scientific classification
- Kingdom: Animalia
- Phylum: Arthropoda
- Subphylum: Chelicerata
- Class: Arachnida
- Order: Araneae
- Infraorder: Mygalomorphae
- Family: Idiopidae
- Genus: Cantuaria
- Species: C. gilliesi

Binomial name
- Cantuaria gilliesi (Pickard-Cambridge, 1878)

Synonyms
- Nemesia gilliesii Arbanitis gilliesi

Species of spider

Cantuaria gilliesi is a species of trapdoor spider endemic to New Zealand.

== Taxonomy ==
This species was first described in 1878 by Octavius Pickard-Cambridge as Nemesia gilliesii. It was then transferred to the Arbanitis in 1892. The species was later transferred to the Cantuaria genus by Ray Forster in 1968. The lectotype is stored at Oxford University Museum of Natural History under registration number 0030.2.

== Description ==
The female has been recorded at 18.4mm in length. The carapace and legs are orange brown. The abdomen is cream with chevron patterns dorsally.

== Distribution ==
This species is only known from near Oamaru in Otago, New Zealand.

== Conservation status ==
Under the New Zealand Threat Classification System, this species is listed as Data Deficient with the qualifiers of "Data Poor: Size" and "Data Poor: Trend".
