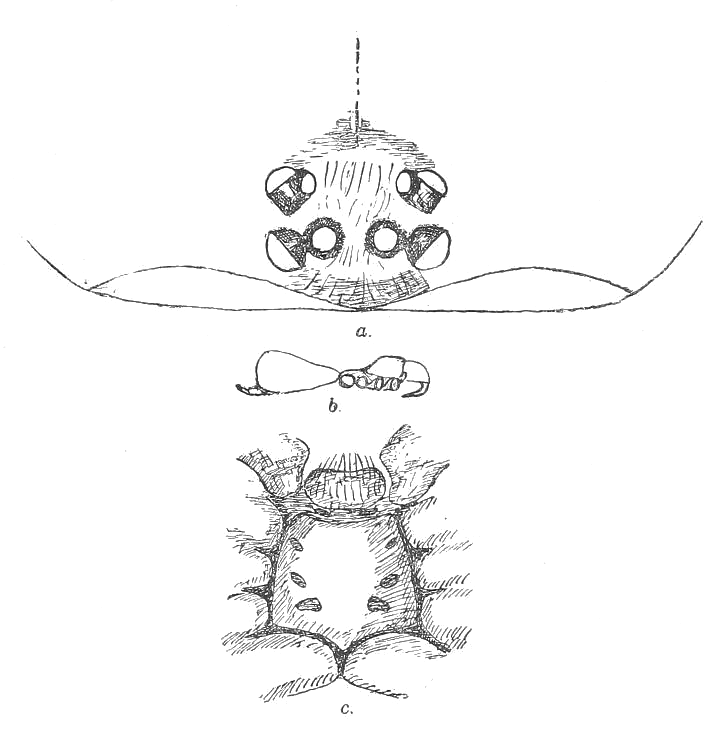
- Cantuaria dendyi

Scientific classification
- Kingdom: Animalia
- Phylum: Arthropoda
- Subphylum: Chelicerata
- Class: Arachnida
- Order: Araneae
- Infraorder: Mygalomorphae
- Family: Idiopidae
- Genus: Cantuaria; Hogg, 1902

Type species
- C. dendyi (Hogg, 1901)

Species
- 43, see text

Synonyms
- Korua Todd, 1945

= Cantuaria =

Genus of spiders

Cantuaria is a genus of South Pacific armored trapdoor spiders that was first described by Henry Roughton Hogg in 1902. From 1985 to 2006 it was merged with former genus Misgolas, now Arbanitis.

== Species ==
As of May 2019 the genus contained forty-three species, almost all from New Zealand (NZ), with one from the Australian state of Tasmania (TAS):

- Cantuaria abdita Forster, 1968 – NZ
- Cantuaria allani Forster, 1968 – NZ
- Cantuaria aperta Forster, 1968 – NZ
- Cantuaria apica Forster, 1968 – NZ
- Cantuaria assimilis Forster, 1968 – NZ
- Cantuaria borealis Forster, 1968 – NZ
- Cantuaria catlinsensis Forster, 1968 – NZ
- Cantuaria cognata Forster, 1968 – NZ
- Cantuaria collensis (Todd, 1945) – NZ
- Cantuaria delli Forster, 1968 – NZ
- Cantuaria dendyi (Hogg, 1901) (type) – NZ
- Cantuaria depressa Forster, 1968 – NZ
- Cantuaria dunedinensis Forster, 1968 – NZ
- Cantuaria gilliesi (O. Pickard-Cambridge, 1878) – NZ
- Cantuaria grandis Forster, 1968 – NZ
- Cantuaria huttoni (O. Pickard-Cambridge, 1880) – NZ
- Cantuaria insulana Forster, 1968 – NZ
- Cantuaria isolata Forster, 1968 – NZ
- Cantuaria johnsi Forster, 1968 – NZ
- Cantuaria kakahuensis Forster, 1968 – NZ
- Cantuaria kakanuiensis Forster, 1968 – NZ
- Cantuaria lomasi Forster, 1968 – NZ
- Cantuaria magna Forster, 1968 – NZ
- Cantuaria marplesi (Todd, 1945) – NZ
- Cantuaria maxima Forster, 1968 – NZ
- Cantuaria medialis Forster, 1968 – NZ
- Cantuaria mestoni (Hickman, 1928) – TAS
- Cantuaria minor Forster, 1968 – NZ
- Cantuaria myersi Forster, 1968 – NZ
- Cantuaria napua Forster, 1968 – NZ
- Cantuaria orepukiensis Forster, 1968 – NZ
- Cantuaria parrotti Forster, 1968 – NZ
- Cantuaria pilama Forster, 1968 – NZ
- Cantuaria prina Forster, 1968 – NZ
- Cantuaria reducta Forster, 1968 – NZ
- Cantuaria secunda Forster, 1968 – NZ
- Cantuaria sinclairi Forster, 1968 – NZ
- Cantuaria stephenensis Forster, 1968 – NZ
- Cantuaria stewarti (Todd, 1945) – NZ
- Cantuaria sylvatica Forster, 1968 – NZ
- Cantuaria toddae Forster, 1968 – NZ
- Cantuaria vellosa Forster, 1968 – NZ
- Cantuaria wanganuiensis (Todd, 1945) – NZ
