= Ozarchaea forsteri =

Conservation status
- Naturally Uncommon (NZ TCS)

Scientific classification
- Kingdom: Animalia
- Phylum: Arthropoda
- Subphylum: Chelicerata
- Class: Arachnida
- Order: Araneae
- Infraorder: Araneomorphae
- Family: Malkaridae
- Genus: Ozarchaea
- Species: O. forsteri

Binomial name
- Ozarchaea forsteri Rix, 2006

Species of spider

Ozarchaea forsteri is a species of Malkaridae that is endemic to New Zealand.

== Taxonomy ==
This species was described in 2006 by Michael Rix from a single female specimen collected in Taranaki. The holotype is stored in Otago Museum.

== Description ==
The female is recorded at 2.35mm in length. The legs and carapace of this species are coloured mustard yellow. The abdomen is also mustard yellow, but with brown markings dorsally and laterally.

== Distribution ==
This species is only known from Pouakai Range on Mount Taranaki in New Zealand.

== Conservation status ==
Under the New Zealand Threat Classification System, this species is listed as "Naturally Uncommon" with the qualifier of "One Location".
