= Flavarchaea =

Scientific classification
- Kingdom: Animalia
- Phylum: Arthropoda
- Subphylum: Chelicerata
- Class: Arachnida
- Order: Araneae
- Infraorder: Araneomorphae
- Family: Malkaridae
- Genus: Flavarchaea; Rix, 2006

Type species
- F. lulu (Rix, 2005)

Species
- 8, see text

Genus of spiders

Flavarchaea is a genus of South Pacific shield spiders that was first described by Michael Gordon Rix in 2006.

== Species ==
As of June 2019 it contains eight species, found only in Australia and on New Caledonia:

- Flavarchaea anzac Rix, 2006 – Australia (Queensland)
- Flavarchaea badja Rix, 2006 – Australia (New South Wales, Australian Capital Territory)
- Flavarchaea barmah Rix, 2006 – Australia (New South Wales, Victoria)
- Flavarchaea hickmani (Rix, 2005) – Australia (Tasmania)
- Flavarchaea humboldti Rix & Harvey, 2010 – New Caledonia
- Flavarchaea lofty Rix, 2006 – Australia (South Australia)
- Flavarchaea lulu (Rix, 2005) (type) – Australia (Tasmania)
- Flavarchaea stirlingensis Rix, 2006 – Australia (Western Australia)
