= Bench Island (New Zealand) =

Island off the east coast of North Stewart Island, New Zealand

- Interactive map of Bench Island

Geography
- Location: Stewart Island
- Coordinates: 46°54′30″S 168°14′15″E

Administration
- New Zealand
- Region: Southland

Demographics
- Population: uninhabited

Bull kelp on rocky foreshore at Bench Island

Bench Island or Te Wāhitauā are unofficial names for an island off the east coast of Stewart Island, New Zealand. It was named 'The Bench' by Captain James Cook. To the east of the island are small islands called Flat Rock and The Haystacks. It is not to be confused with the neighbouring Ruapuke Island which was also named Bench Island.

Bench Island was previously known as Run 538. In 1941 Bench Island was described as being covered in a dense layer of trees, shrublands and tree ferns.

== Name ==
The name of Bench Island originates from Captain James Cook, who named the island 'The Bench'.

A newspaper from 1930 attributes the name Te Wahi-taua to "tradition asserts a war party were forced to land there, presumably on a voyage from Ruapuke to The Neck, but the writer could not get particulars."
