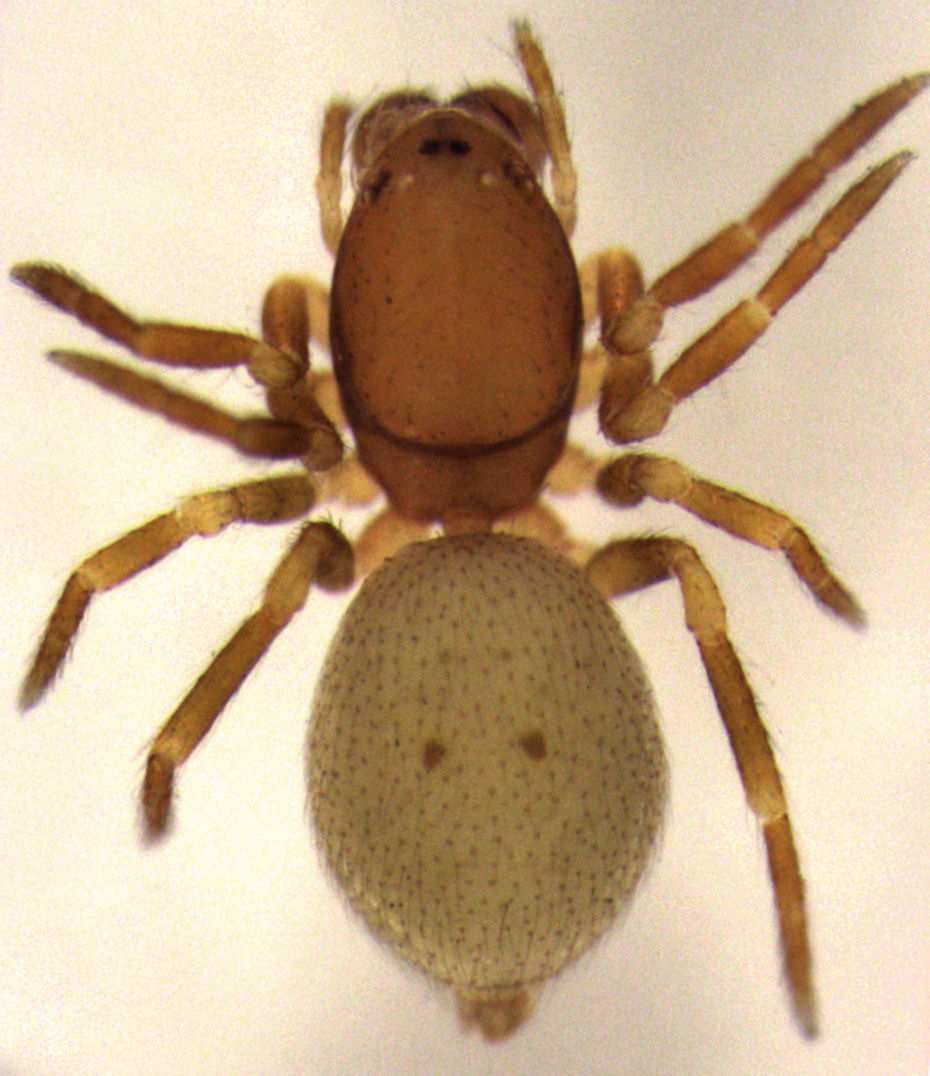
- Pararchaea alba

Conservation status
- Not Threatened (NZ TCS)

Scientific classification
- Kingdom: Animalia
- Phylum: Arthropoda
- Subphylum: Chelicerata
- Class: Arachnida
- Order: Araneae
- Infraorder: Araneomorphae
- Family: Malkaridae
- Genus: Pararchaea; Forster, 1955
- Species: P. alba

Binomial name
- Pararchaea alba Forster, 1955

= Pararchaea =

Genus of spiders

Pararchaea is a monotypic genus of shield spiders from New Zealand containing the single species, Pararchaea alba.

== Taxonomy ==
This genus was described in 1955 by Ray Forster from male and female specimens collected from Fiordland. The holotype is stored in Canterbury Museum.

== Description ==
The male is recorded at 1.54mm in length whereas the female is 1.74mm. This species has brown legs, a brown carapace and creamy white abdomen.

== Distribution ==
This genus is known from scattered localities in the South Island.

== Conservation status ==
Under the New Zealand Threat Classification System, this species is listed as "Not Threatened.
