= Nanarchaea =

Scientific classification
- Kingdom: Animalia
- Phylum: Arthropoda
- Subphylum: Chelicerata
- Class: Arachnida
- Order: Araneae
- Infraorder: Araneomorphae
- Family: Malkaridae
- Genus: Nanarchaea; Rix, 2006

Type species
- N. binnaburra (Forster, 1955)

Species
- N. binnaburra (Forster, 1955) – Australia (Queensland); N. bryophila (Hickman, 1969) – Australia (New South Wales, Victoria, Tasmania)

Genus of spiders

Nanarchaea is a genus of Australian shield spiders that was first described by Michael Gordon Rix in 2006. As of June 2019 it contains only two species, found in Tasmania, Victoria, New South Wales, and Queensland: N. binnaburra and N. bryophila.
