= Ozarchaea =

Scientific classification
- Kingdom: Animalia
- Phylum: Arthropoda
- Subphylum: Chelicerata
- Class: Arachnida
- Order: Araneae
- Infraorder: Araneomorphae
- Family: Malkaridae
- Genus: Ozarchaea; Rix, 2006

Type species
- O. ornata (Hickman, 1969)

Species
- 16, see text

Genus of spiders

Ozarchaea is a genus of South Pacific shield spiders that was first described by Michael Gordon Rix in 2006.

== Species ==
As of June 2019 it contains sixteen species, found only in New Zealand and Australia:

- Ozarchaea bodalla Rix, 2006 – Australia (New South Wales)
- Ozarchaea bondi Rix, 2006 – Australia (New South Wales)
- Ozarchaea daviesae Rix, 2006 – Australia (Queensland)
- Ozarchaea forsteri Rix, 2006 – New Zealand
- Ozarchaea harveyi Rix, 2006 – Australia (Western Australia)
- Ozarchaea janineae Rix, 2006 – Australia (New South Wales)
- Ozarchaea ornata (Hickman, 1969) (type) – Australia (Tasmania)
- Ozarchaea platnicki Rix, 2006 – Australia (Queensland)
- Ozarchaea saxicola (Hickman, 1969) – Australia (Tasmania)
- Ozarchaea spurgeon Rix, 2006 – Australia (Queensland)
- Ozarchaea stradbroke Rix, 2006 – Australia (Queensland)
- Ozarchaea valida Rix, 2006 – Australia (New South Wales)
- Ozarchaea waldockae Rix, 2006 – Australia (Western Australia)
- Ozarchaea werrikimbe Rix, 2006 – Australia (New South Wales)
- Ozarchaea westraliensis Rix, 2006 – Australia (Western Australia)
- Ozarchaea wiangarie Rix, 2006 – Australia (New South Wales)
