= Westrarchaea =

Scientific classification
- Kingdom: Animalia
- Phylum: Arthropoda
- Subphylum: Chelicerata
- Class: Arachnida
- Order: Araneae
- Infraorder: Araneomorphae
- Family: Malkaridae
- Genus: Westrarchaea; Rix, 2006

Type species
- W. sinuosa Rix, 2006

Species
- W. pusilla Rix, 2006 – Australia (Western Australia); W. sinuosa Rix, 2006 – Australia (Western Australia); W. spinosa Rix, 2006 – Australia (Western Australia)

Genus of spiders

Westrarchaea is a genus of Western Australian shield spiders that was first described by Michael Gordon Rix in 2006. As of June 2019 it contains only three species, found only in Western Australia: W. pusilla, W. sinuosa, and W. spinosa.
