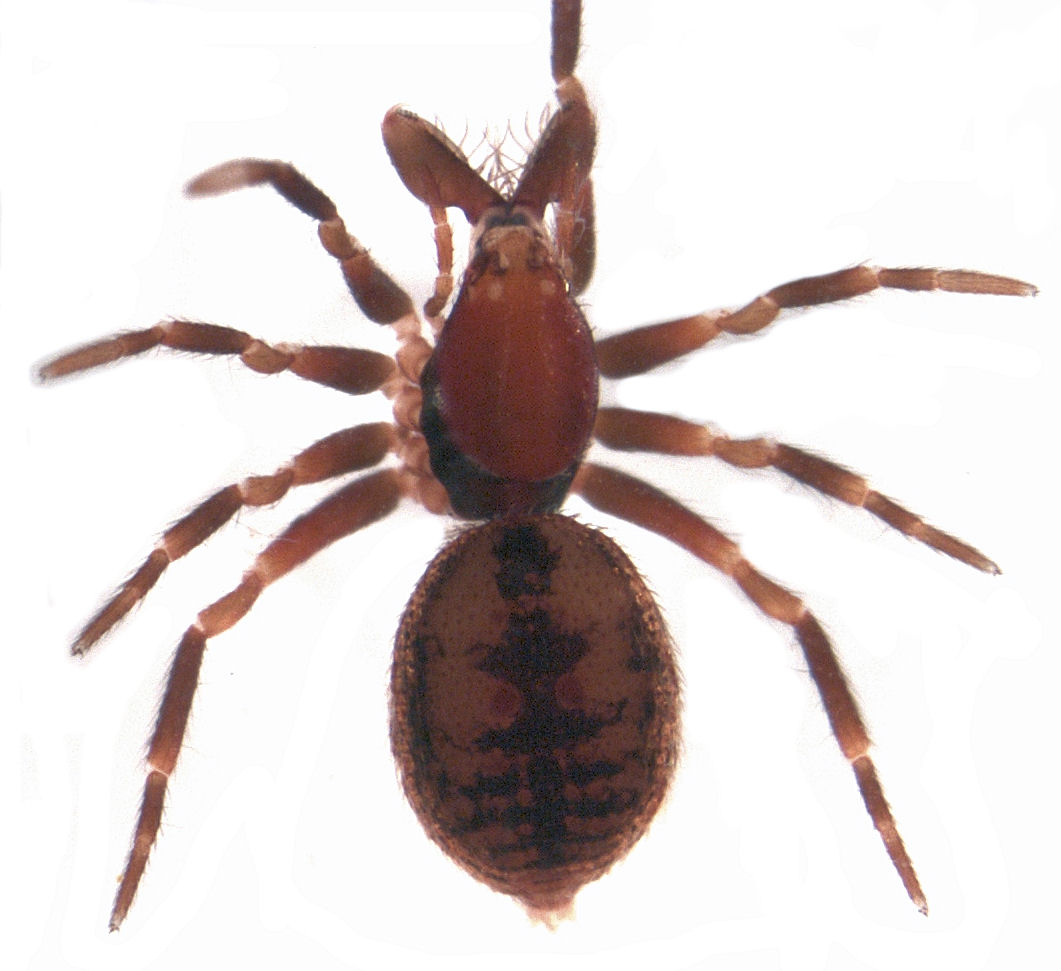

Conservation status
- Not Threatened (NZ TCS)

Scientific classification
- Kingdom: Animalia
- Phylum: Arthropoda
- Subphylum: Chelicerata
- Class: Arachnida
- Order: Araneae
- Infraorder: Araneomorphae
- Family: Malkaridae
- Genus: Forstrarchaea; Rix, 2006
- Species: F. rubra

Binomial name
- Forstrarchaea rubra (Forster, 1949)

Synonyms
- Zearchaea rubra Pararchaea rubra

= Forstrarchaea =

Genus of spiders

Forstrarchaea is a monotypic genus of shield spiders from New Zealand containing the single species, Forstrarchaea rubra.

== Taxonomy ==
The species was first described in 1949 by Ray Forster. The holotype is stored in Te Papa Museum under registration number AS.000098. The genus was described in 2006 by Michael Gordon Rix.

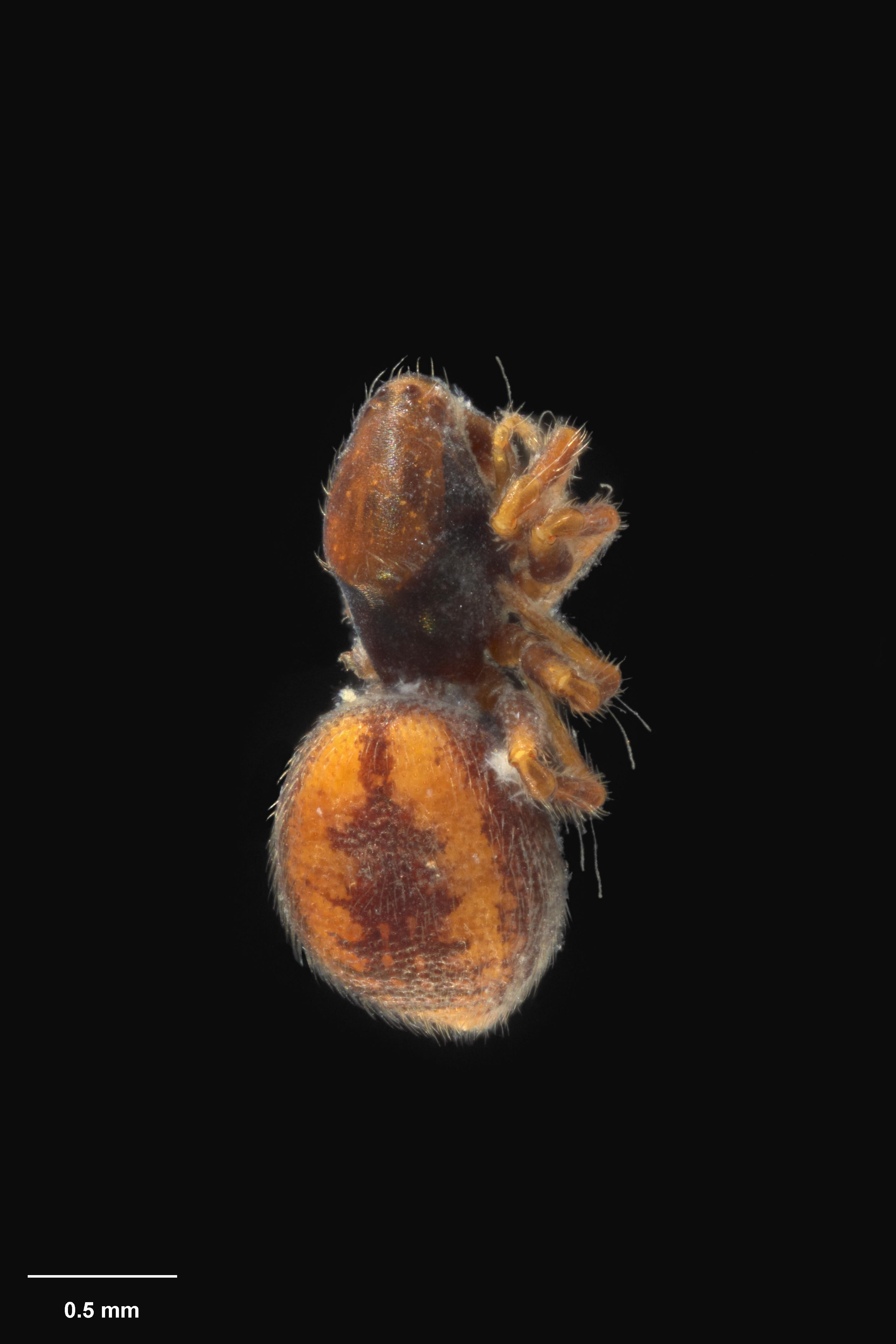
The holotype of Forstrarchaea rubra

== Description ==
The female is recorded at 2.17mm in length whereas the male is 1.72mm. After being preserved, this species has a dark golden brown carapace. The legs are dark brown. The abdomen is orange yellow with dark brown markings dorsally.

== Distribution ==
This species is restricted to the northern half of the North Island.

== Conservation status ==
Under the New Zealand Threat Classification System, this species is listed as "Not Threatened".
