= Carathea =

Scientific classification
- Kingdom: Animalia
- Phylum: Arthropoda
- Subphylum: Chelicerata
- Class: Arachnida
- Order: Araneae
- Infraorder: Araneomorphae
- Family: Malkaridae
- Genus: Carathea; Moran, 1986

Species
- Carathea miyali; Carathea parawea

Genus of spiders

Carathea is a genus of Tasmanian spiders within the family Malkaridae that was named and first described by R. J. Moran in 1986. The name comes from the Australian aboriginal word for "sister". The type species is C. parawea. The features unique to spiders of this genus include a thin tip to the conductor (a sclerite in the male palpal bulb), the absence of "horns" on the carapace, and, in females, the internal genitalia are large and less compact, usually only containing three or four coils.
