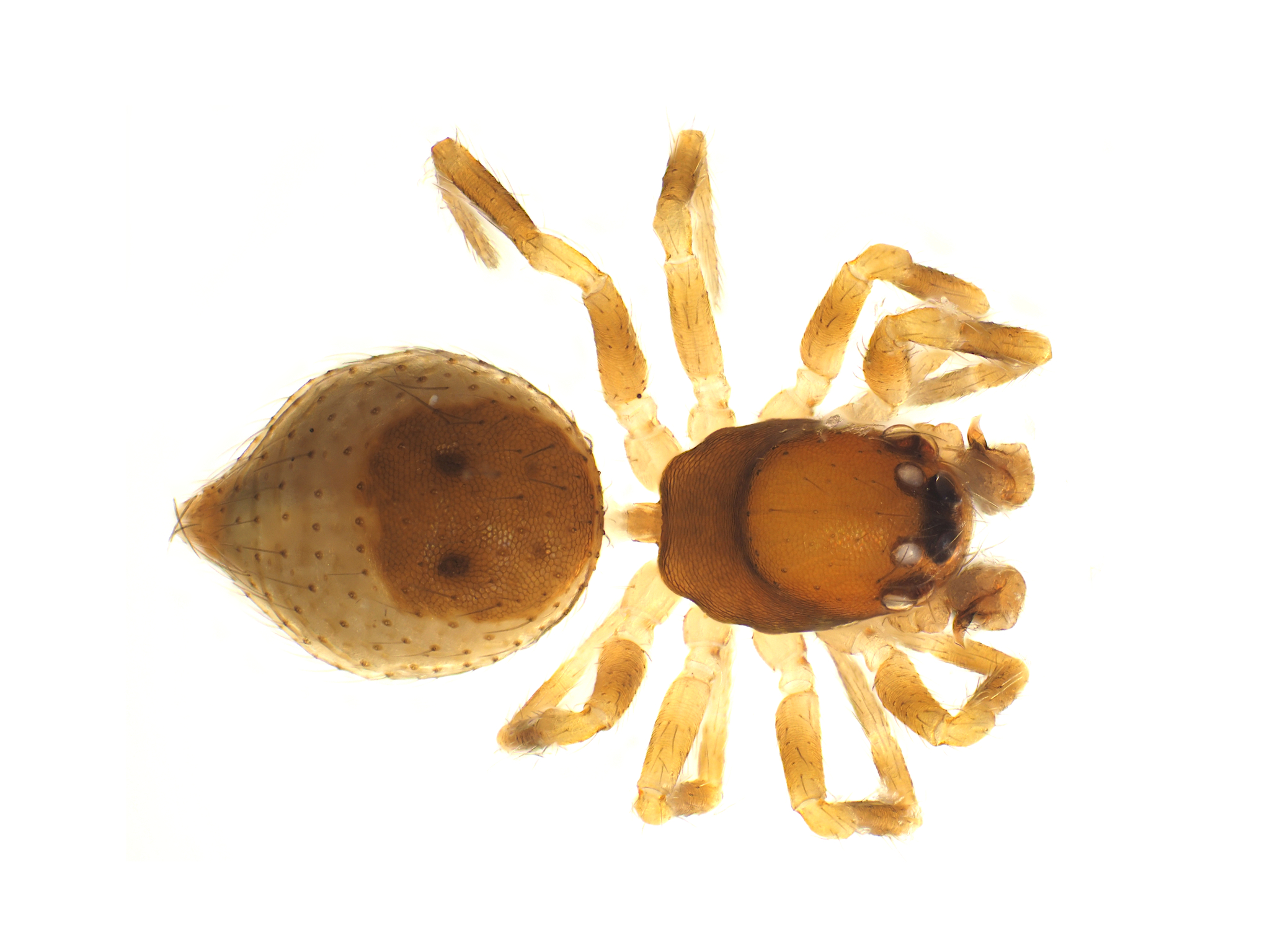
- Anarchaea raveni

Scientific classification
- Kingdom: Animalia
- Phylum: Arthropoda
- Subphylum: Chelicerata
- Class: Arachnida
- Order: Araneae
- Infraorder: Araneomorphae
- Family: Malkaridae
- Genus: Anarchaea; Rix, 2006

Type species
- A. corticola (Hickman, 1969)

Species
- 4, see text

= Anarchaea =

Genus of spiders

Anarchaea is a genus of Australian shield spiders that was first described by Michael Gordon Rix in 2006.

== Species ==
As of June 2019 it contains four species, found only in Queensland, New South Wales, and Tasmania:

- Anarchaea corticola (Hickman, 1969) (type) – Australia (Tasmania)
- Anarchaea falcata Rix, 2006 – Australia (New South Wales)
- Anarchaea raveni Rix, 2006 – Australia (Queensland)
- Anarchaea robusta (Rix, 2005) – Australia (Tasmania)
