= Perissopmeros =

Scientific classification
- Domain: Eukaryota
- Kingdom: Animalia
- Phylum: Arthropoda
- Subphylum: Chelicerata
- Class: Arachnida
- Order: Araneae
- Infraorder: Araneomorphae
- Family: Malkaridae
- Genus: Perissopmeros; Butler

Type species
- Perissopmeros castaneous

Species
- 7, see text

Genus of spiders

Perissopmeros is a genus of spiders in the family Malkaridae. It was first described in 1932 by Butler. As of 2017, it contains 7 species, all from Australia.

== Species ==
Perissopmeros comprises the following species:

- Perissopmeros arkana (Moran, 1986)
- Perissopmeros castaneous Butler, 1932
- Perissopmeros darwini Rix, Roberts & Harvey, 2009
- Perissopmeros foraminatus (Butler, 1929)
- Perissopmeros grayi (Moran, 1986)
- Perissopmeros mullawerringi (Moran, 1986)
- Perissopmeros quinguni (Moran, 1986)
