= Chilenodes =

Scientific classification
- Kingdom: Animalia
- Phylum: Arthropoda
- Subphylum: Chelicerata
- Class: Arachnida
- Order: Araneae
- Infraorder: Araneomorphae
- Family: Malkaridae
- Genus: Chilenodes; Platnick & Forster, 1987
- Species: C. australis

Binomial name
- Chilenodes australis Platnick & Forster, 1987

Genus of spiders

Chilenodes is a monotypic genus of spiders in the family Malkaridae. It was first described by Platnick & Forster in 1987. As of 2023, it contains only one species, Chilenodes australis, found in Chile and Argentina.
