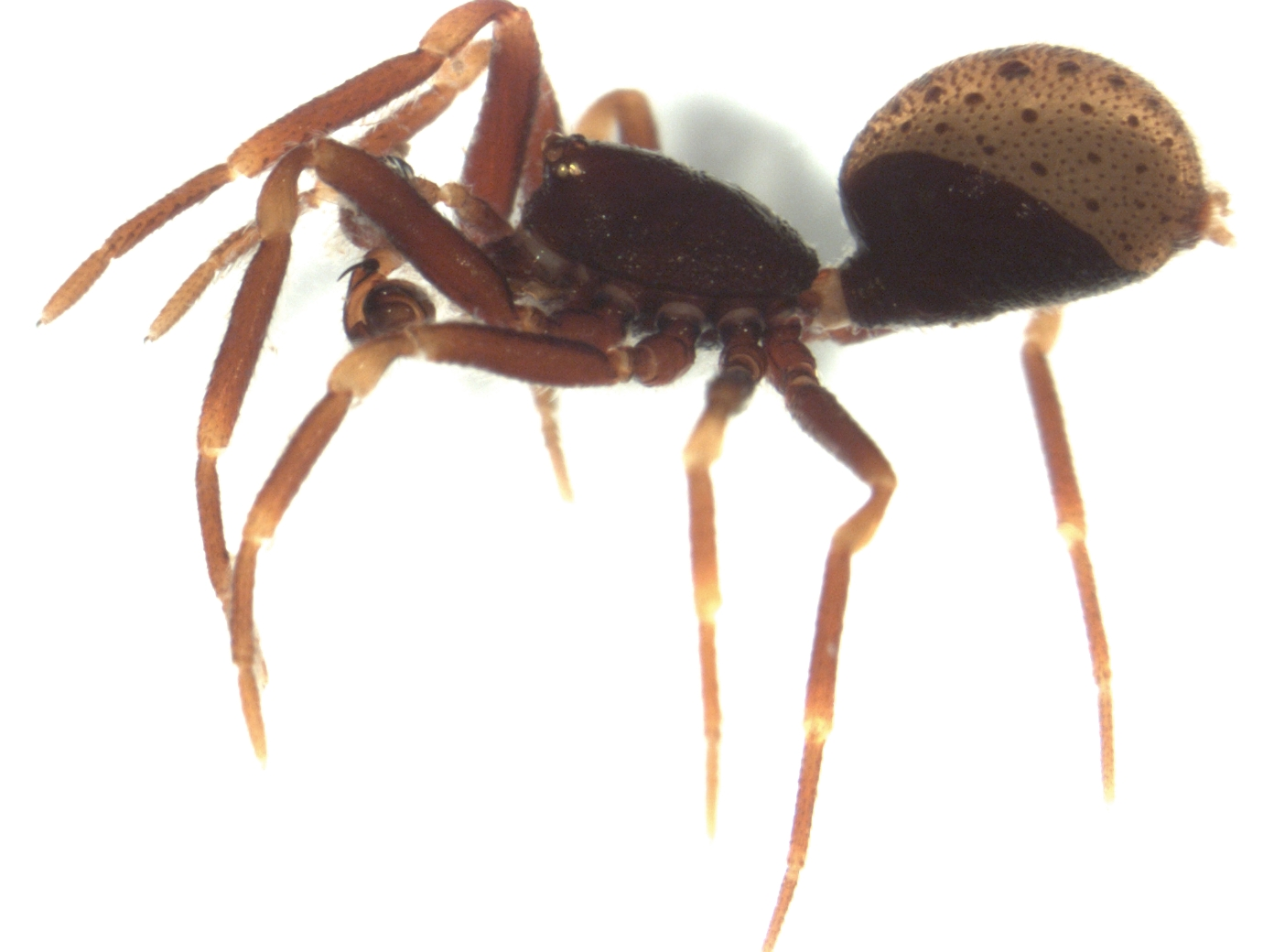
- Malkara sp.
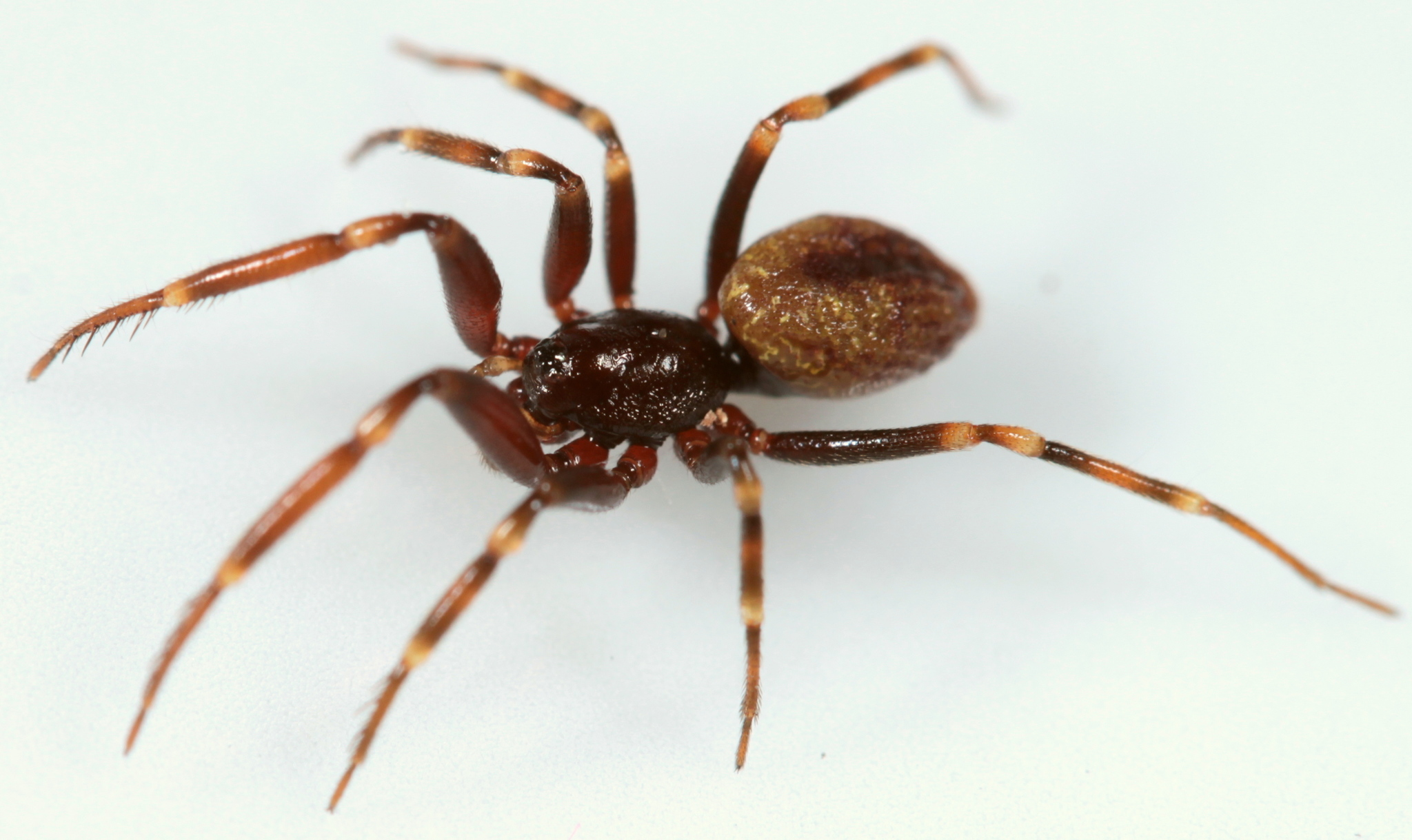
- Whakamoke paoka in New Zealand

Scientific classification
- Kingdom: Animalia
- Phylum: Arthropoda
- Subphylum: Chelicerata
- Class: Arachnida
- Order: Araneae
- Infraorder: Araneomorphae
- Family: Malkaridae; Davies, 1980

Diversity
- 13 genera, 57 species
- blue: reported countries (WSC)

= Malkaridae =

Pitted shield spiders

Family of spiders

Malkaridae is a small family of araneomorph spiders first described by Valerie Todd Davies in 1980. In 2017, the family Pararchaeidae was brought into synonymy with Malkaridae.

== Genera ==
As of January 2026, this family includes thirteen genera and 57 species:

- Anarchaea Rix, 2006 – Australia
- Carathea Moran, 1986 – Australia
- Chilenodes Platnick & Forster, 1987 – Argentina, Chile
- Flavarchaea Rix, 2006 – Australia, New Caledonia
- Forstrarchaea Rix, 2006 – New Zealand
- Malkara Davies, 1980 – Australia
- Nanarchaea Rix, 2006 – Australia
- Ozarchaea Rix, 2006 – Australia, New Zealand
- Pararchaea Forster, 1955 – New Zealand
- Perissopmeros Butler, 1932 – Australia
- Tingotingo Hormiga & Scharff, 2020 – New Zealand
- Westrarchaea Rix, 2006 – Australia
- Whakamoke Hormiga & Scharff, 2020 – New Zealand
