= Valerie Todd Davies =

New Zealand-Australian arachnologist (1920–2012)

Valerie Todd Davies (29 September 1920 – 29 October 2012) was a New Zealand-Australian arachnologist who described many species of spiders.

== Early life ==
Valerie Ethel Todd (later Valerie Davies after her marriage) was born 29 September 1920 in Makirikiri, near Wanganui, in New Zealand. She attended Whanganui Girls' College and then studied her BSc at Victoria University in Wellington in 1939. She continued her studies toward a MSc at Otago University in Dunedin, graduating in 1943. Her thesis researched trap-door spiders. Upon graduation she worked as a research assistant and later an assistant lecturer in zoology at Otago University.

Todd was awarded a post-graduate travelling scholarship in science to Somerville College, Oxford, where she completed her PhD. She returned to Dunedin in 1948 to marry George Davies, who was a lecturer in dentistry at the University of Otago.

== Career ==
The Davies family moved to Brisbane in 1963 when George was appointed professor of social and preventive dentistry at the University of Queensland. Davies tutored part-time in the department of zoology, at the University of Queensland from 1964 to 1972. They built a house in 1965, designed by architect Maurice Hurst, on the banks of the Brisbane River at Fig Tree Pocket – Awanui.

In 1972, Davies was appointed curator of arachnids at the Queensland Museum and, during her time there, she built up the collection by organising and attending numerous expeditions and systematically sorting and identifying each specimen. She was later promoted to senior curator at the Queensland Museum until her retirement in 1985 but continued working as an honorary consultant at the museum until the age of 82.

== Awards and legacy ==
- 1988 – Queensland Museum Medal
- 2010 – Lifetime Achievement Award, International Society of Arachnology
- 2010 - Simon Award, International Society of Arachnology

The genera Toddiana and Daviesa as well as 15 new species of arachnids, including Austrachaea daviesae were named for her. The spiders she collected and indexed during many expeditions to north Queensland form the basis of the arachnid collection at the Queensland Museum. 100 new species of spider and 17 new genera were collected during her many expeditions to Cape York, Mount Finnegan, Mount Bellenden and Hinchinbrook Island.

Davies was a member of the International Federation of University Women (IFUW) and from 1978 to 1982 was deputy chair of the Queensland Rhodes Scholarship selection committee.

== Personal life ==
Valerie Todd married George Davies, who she had known from girlhood, in 1948. They had three children. She died on 29 October 2012.

== Publications ==
Davies authored over 40 publications with the most substantial being:

- Davies, Valerie Todd, 1920- 2012 & Queensland Museum. (1986). Australian spiders (Araneae) : collection, preservation and identification. Brisbane : Queensland Museum
