= Trapdoor spider =

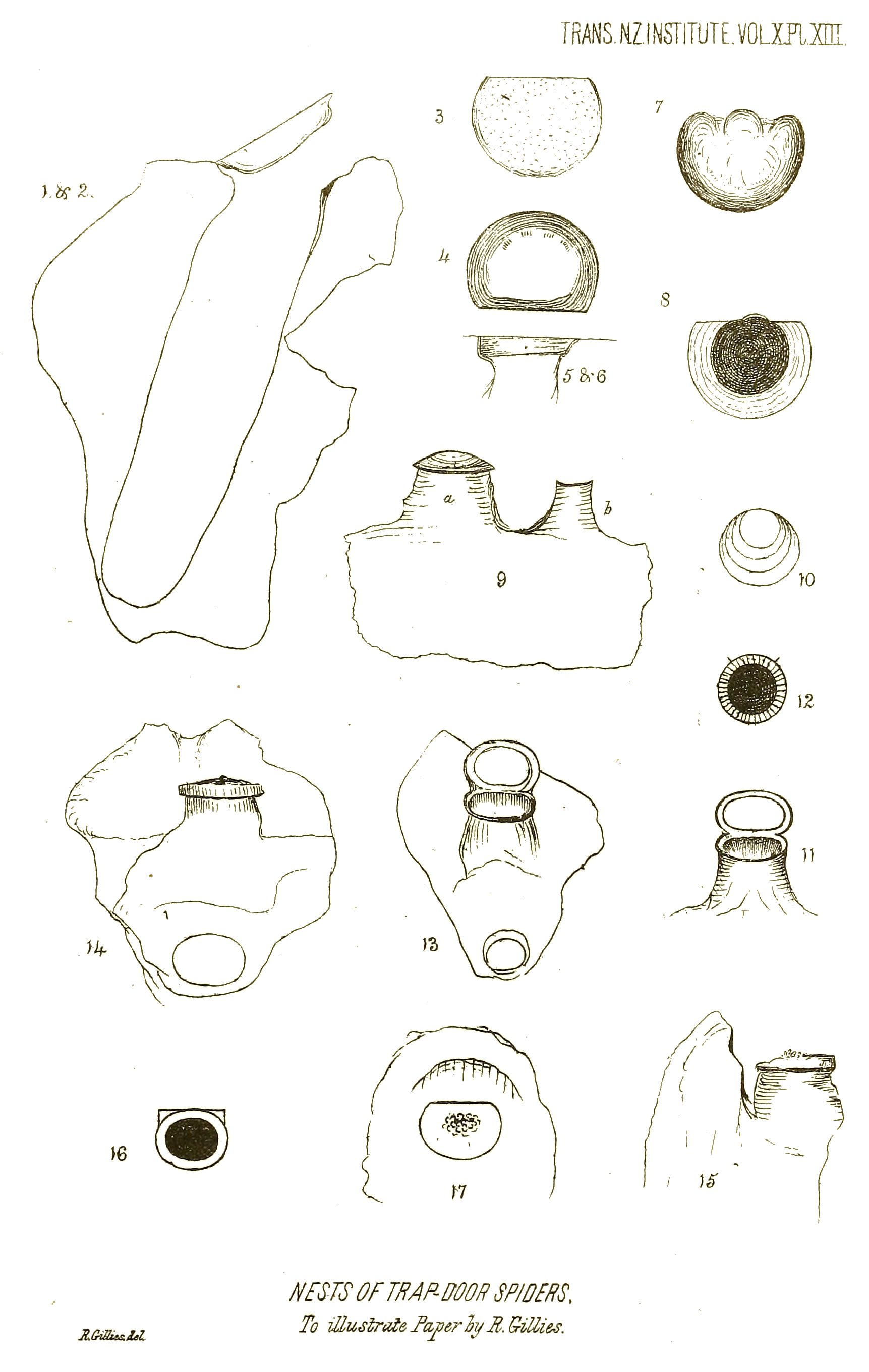
Illustration of trapdoor spider nest, c.1877

Trapdoor spider is a common name for various spiders from several different groups that create burrows with a silk-hinged trapdoor to help them ambush prey.

Several families within the infraorder Mygalomorphae contain trapdoor spiders:

- Actinopodidae, a family otherwise known as 'mouse-spiders', in South America and Australia
- Antrodiaetidae, a family of 'folding trapdoor spiders' from the United States and Japan
- Barychelidae, a family of 'brush-footed trapdoor spiders' with pantropical distribution
- Ctenizidae, a family of 'cork-lid trapdoor spiders' in tropical and subtropical regions
- Cyrtaucheniidae, a family of 'wafer-lid trapdoor spiders', with wide distribution except cooler regions
- Euctenizidae, a family of spiders that make wafer-like or cork-like trapdoors
- Halonoproctidae, a family of spiders that make wafer-like or cork-like trapdoors and includes the phragmotic genus Cyclocosmia
- Idiopidae, a family of 'spurred-trapdoor spiders' or 'armoured trapdoors' mostly in Southern Hemisphere
- Migidae, also known as 'ridge fanged trapdoor spiders' or 'tree trapdoor spiders', in the Southern Hemisphere
- Nemesiidae, a family of 'tube trapdoor spiders', with both tropical and temperate species worldwide
- Theraphosidae, a family of tarantulas (where just a few species make trapdoors), also with wide distribution

There is also one family of trapdoor spiders in the suborder Mesothelae:

- Liphistiidae, a family of spiders with armoured abdomens from Southeast Asia, China and Japan
