= Ziyang Bridge =

Ziyang Bridge 紫阳桥
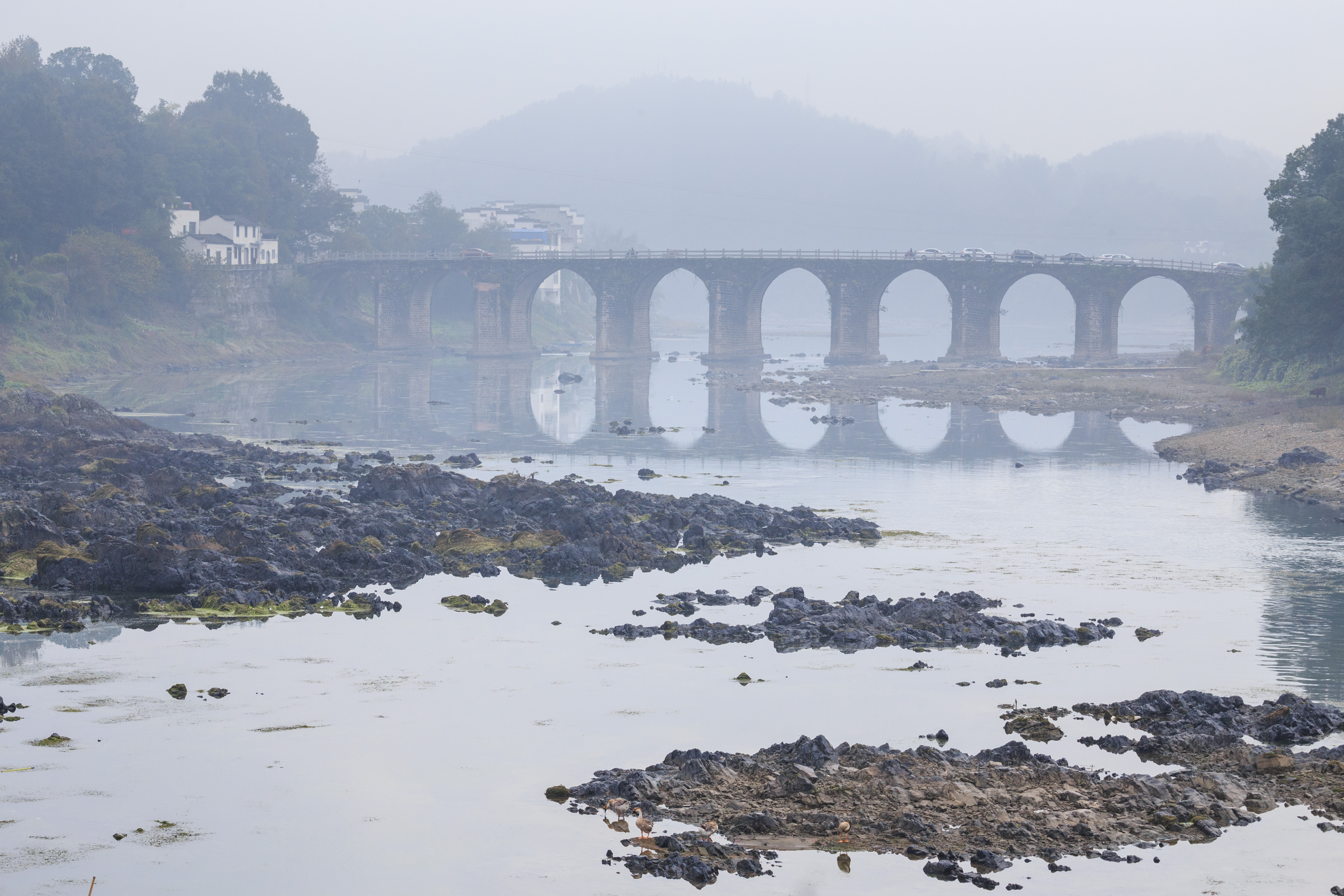
- Ziyang Bridge in November 2016
- Coordinates: 29°51′40″N 118°27′38″E
- Carries: Pedestrians
- Crosses: Lian River
- Locale: Huicheng, She County, Anhui, China

Characteristics
- Design: Arch bridge
- Material: Stone
- Total length: 140 metres (460 ft)
- Width: 10 metres (33 ft)
- Height: 14 metres (46 ft)

History
- Construction start: 1606
- Construction end: 1614

Location
- Interactive map of Ziyang Bridge

The Ziyang Bridge (simplified Chinese: 紫阳桥; traditional Chinese: 紫陽橋; pinyin: Zǐyáng Qiáo) is a historic stone arch bridge over the Lian River in the town of Huicheng, She County, Anhui, China.

== Etymology ==
Ziyang Bridge is named for its proximity to Ziyang Mountain (紫阳山) in the west.

== History ==
The bridge traces its origins to the former "Shoumin Bridge" (寿民桥), founded by magistrates of Huizhou (徽州知府) between 1606 and 1614 in the late Ming dynasty (1368–1644).

In June 2012, it has been designated as a provincial-level cultural heritage site by the Government of Anhui.

== Gallery ==
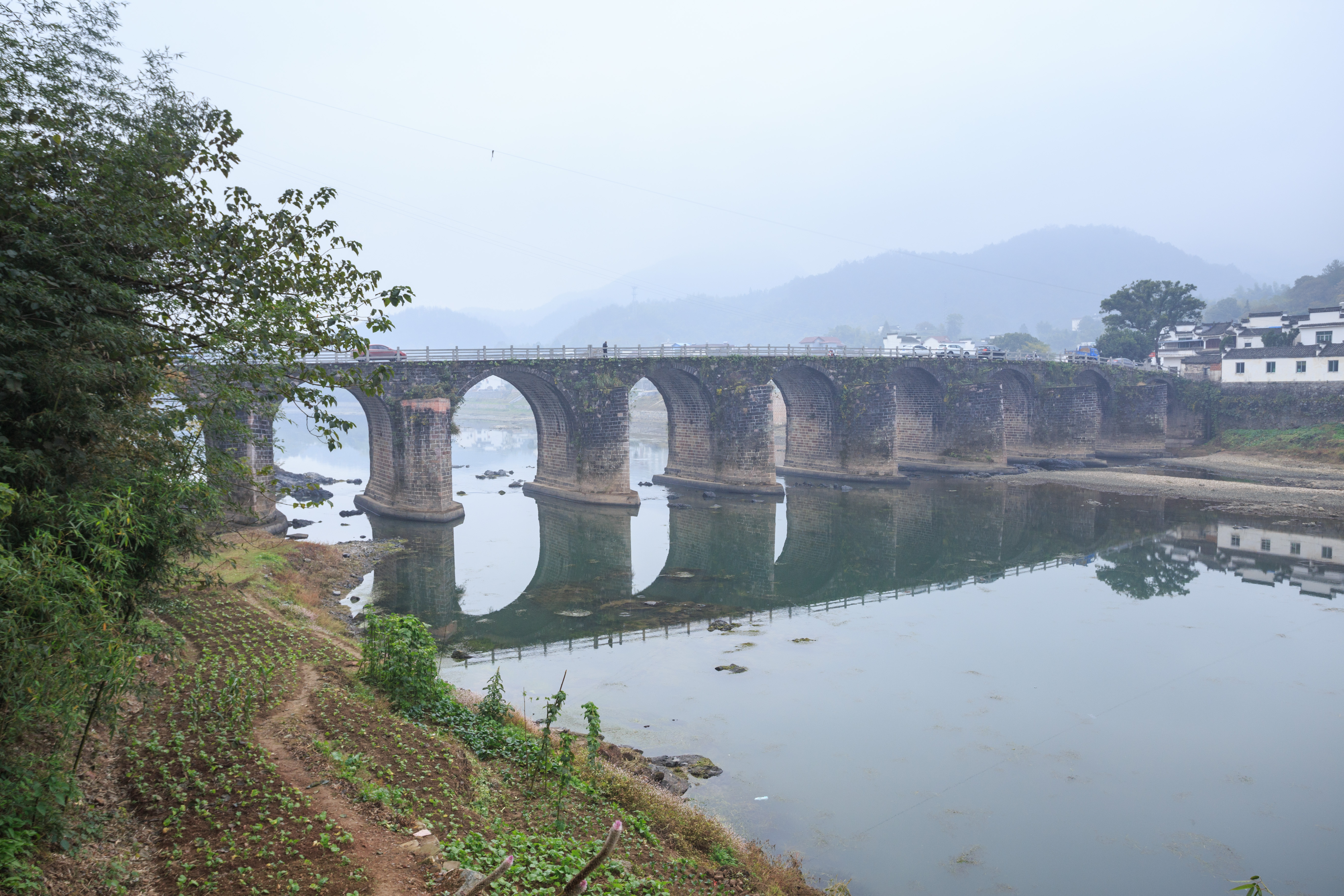
Ziyang Bridge in November 2016

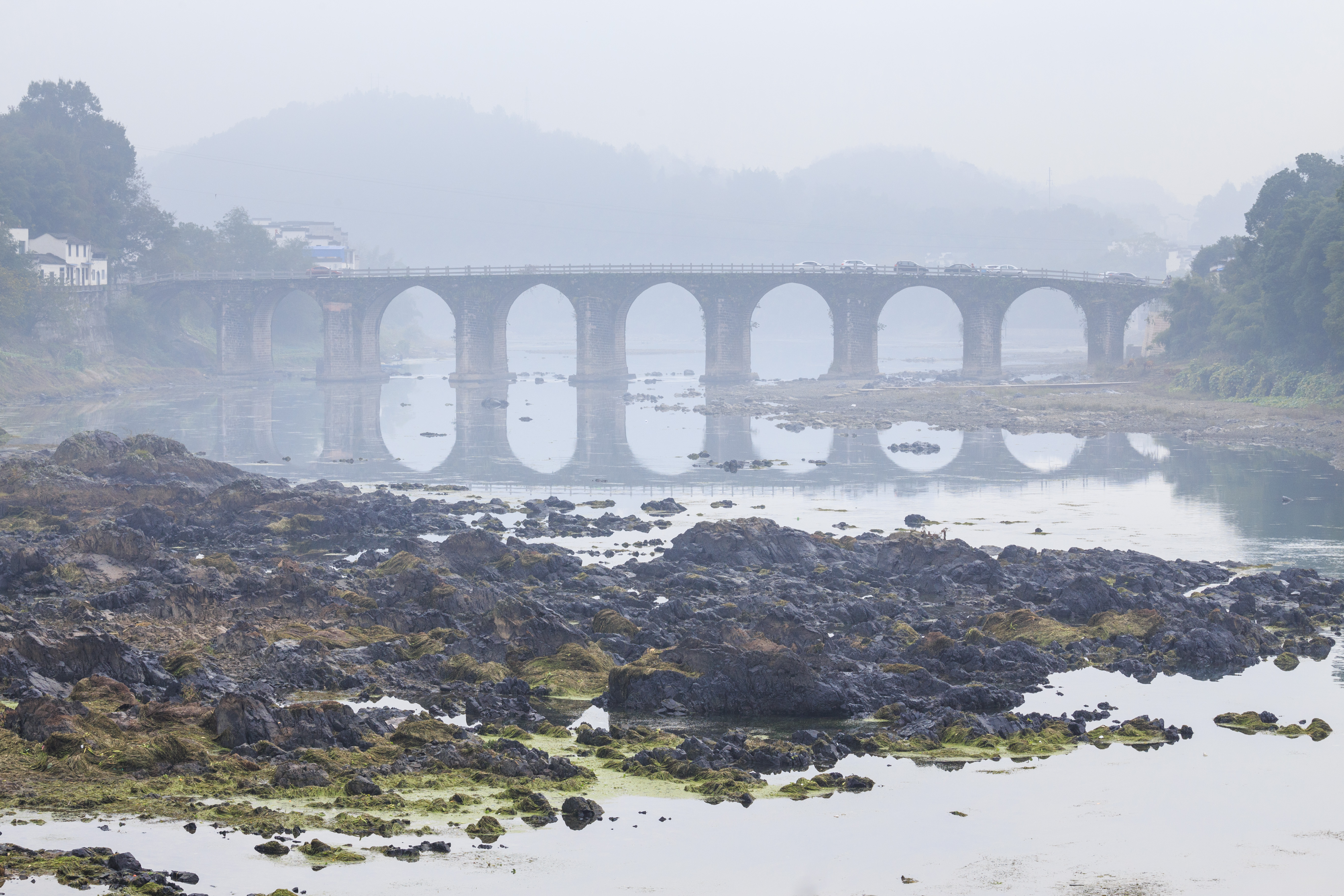
Ziyang Bridge in November 2016

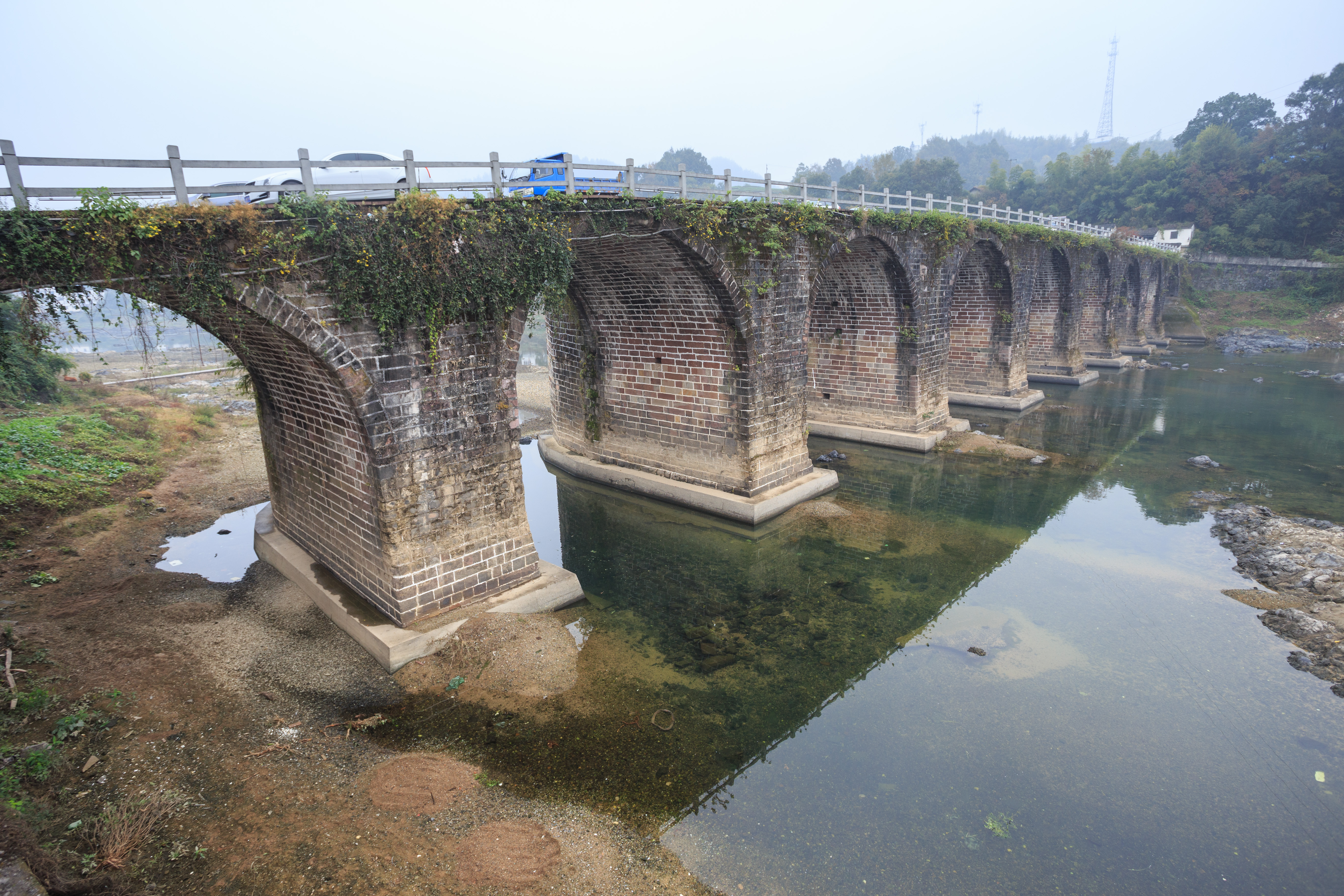
Ziyang Bridge in November 2016
