= Huicheng =

Huicheng may refer to:

- Huicheng District (惠城区) of Huizhou City, Guangdong, China.
- Huicheng Town (徽城镇) of She County, Anhui, China.
- Huicheng Subdistrict (会城街道), the central subdistrict of Xinhui District, Guangdong, China.
- Huicheng Township (回城乡) of Hami, Xinjiang.
