= Wannian Bridge (She County) =

Wannian Bridge 万年桥
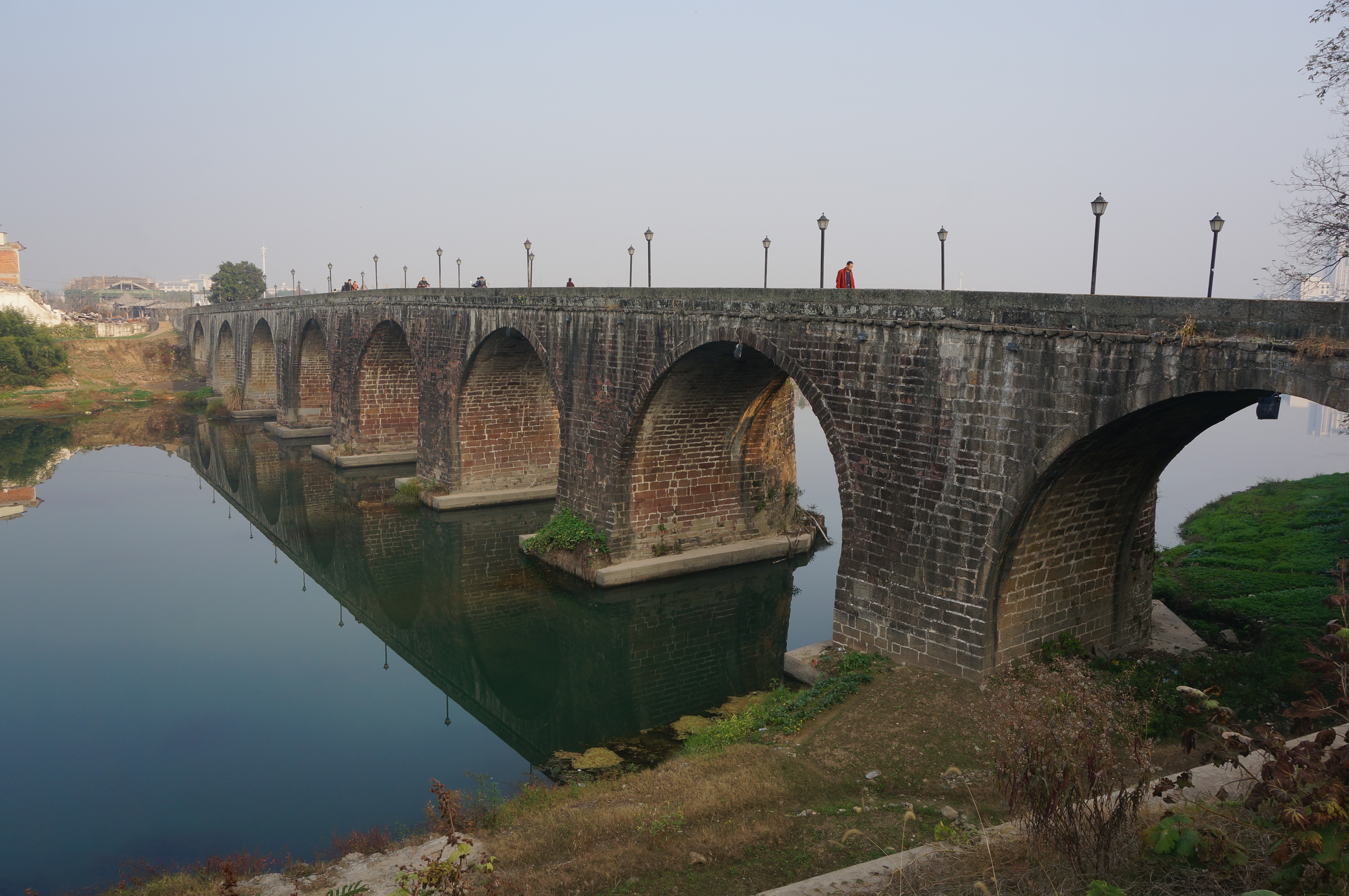
- Wannian Bridge in November 2014
- Coordinates: 29°52′38″N 118°26′29″E
- Carries: Pedestrians
- Crosses: Yangzhi River
- Locale: Huicheng, She County, Anhui, China

Characteristics
- Design: Arch bridge
- Material: Stone
- Total length: 153 metres (502 ft)
- Width: 6.7 metres (22 ft)
- Height: 10 metres (33 ft)

History
- Construction end: 1573
- Rebuilt: 1894

Location
- Interactive map of Wannian Bridge

The Wannian Bridge (simplified Chinese: 万年桥; traditional Chinese: 萬年橋; pinyin: Wǎnnián Qiáo) is a historic stone arch bridge over the Yangzhi River in the town of Huicheng, She County, Anhui, China.

== History ==
The original bridge dates back to 1573 during the Wanli era of the Ming dynasty (1368–1644), and rebuilt in 1894 during the reign of Guangxu Emperor of the Qing dynasty (1644–1911).

In June 2012, it has been inscribed as a provincial-level cultural heritage site by the Government of Anhui.

== Gallery ==
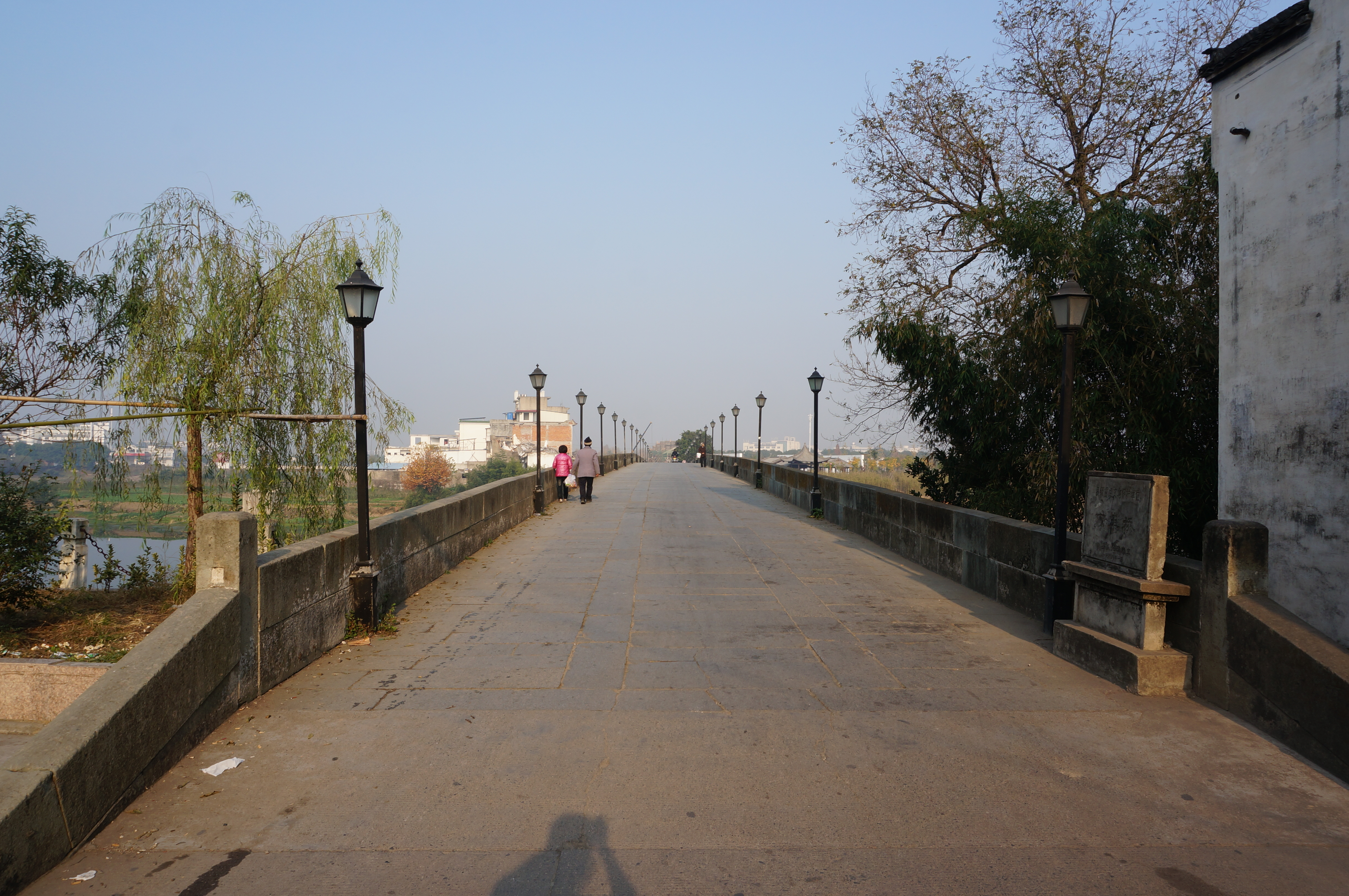
Wannian Bridge in November 2014

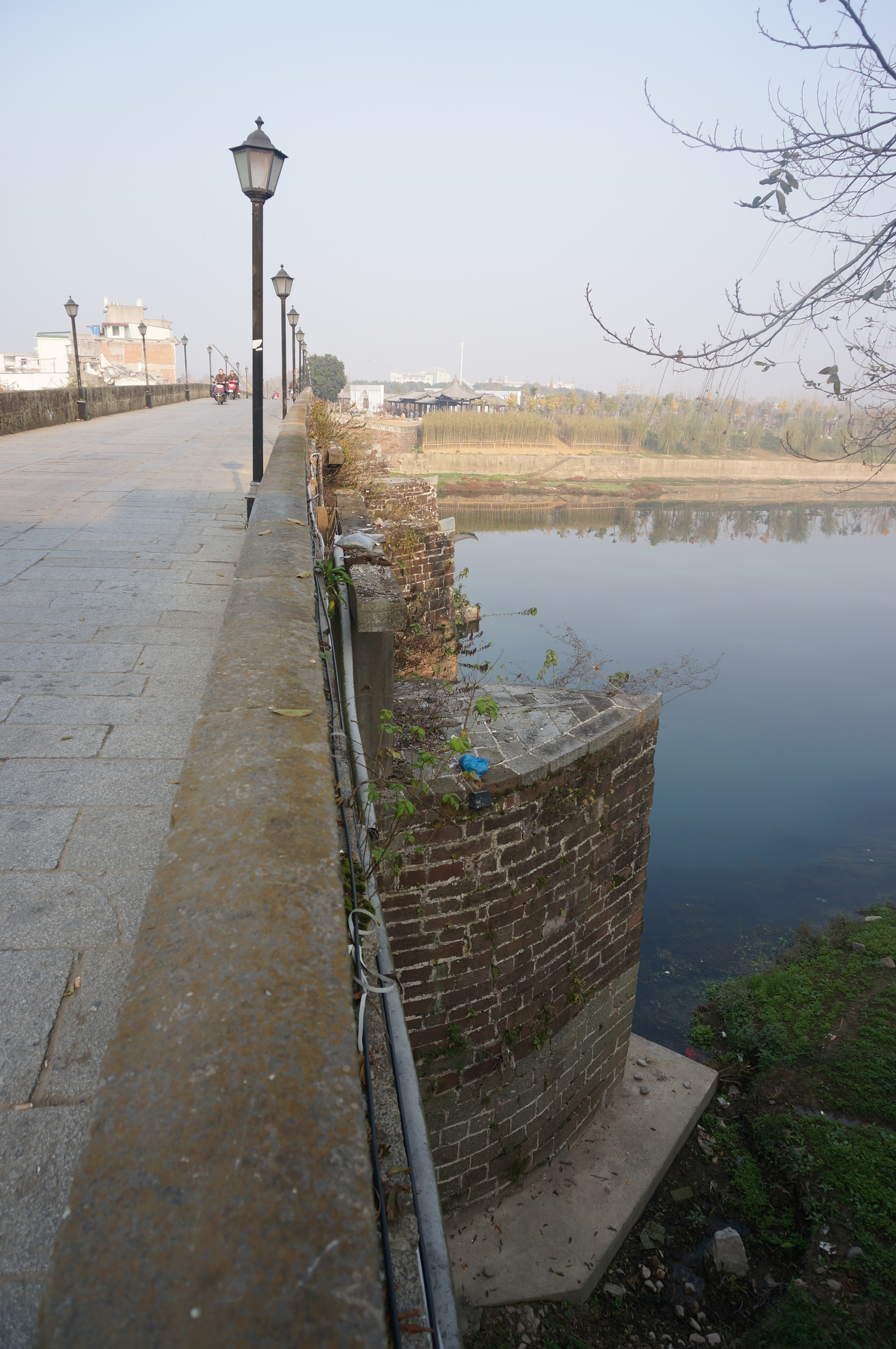
Wannian Bridge in November 2014

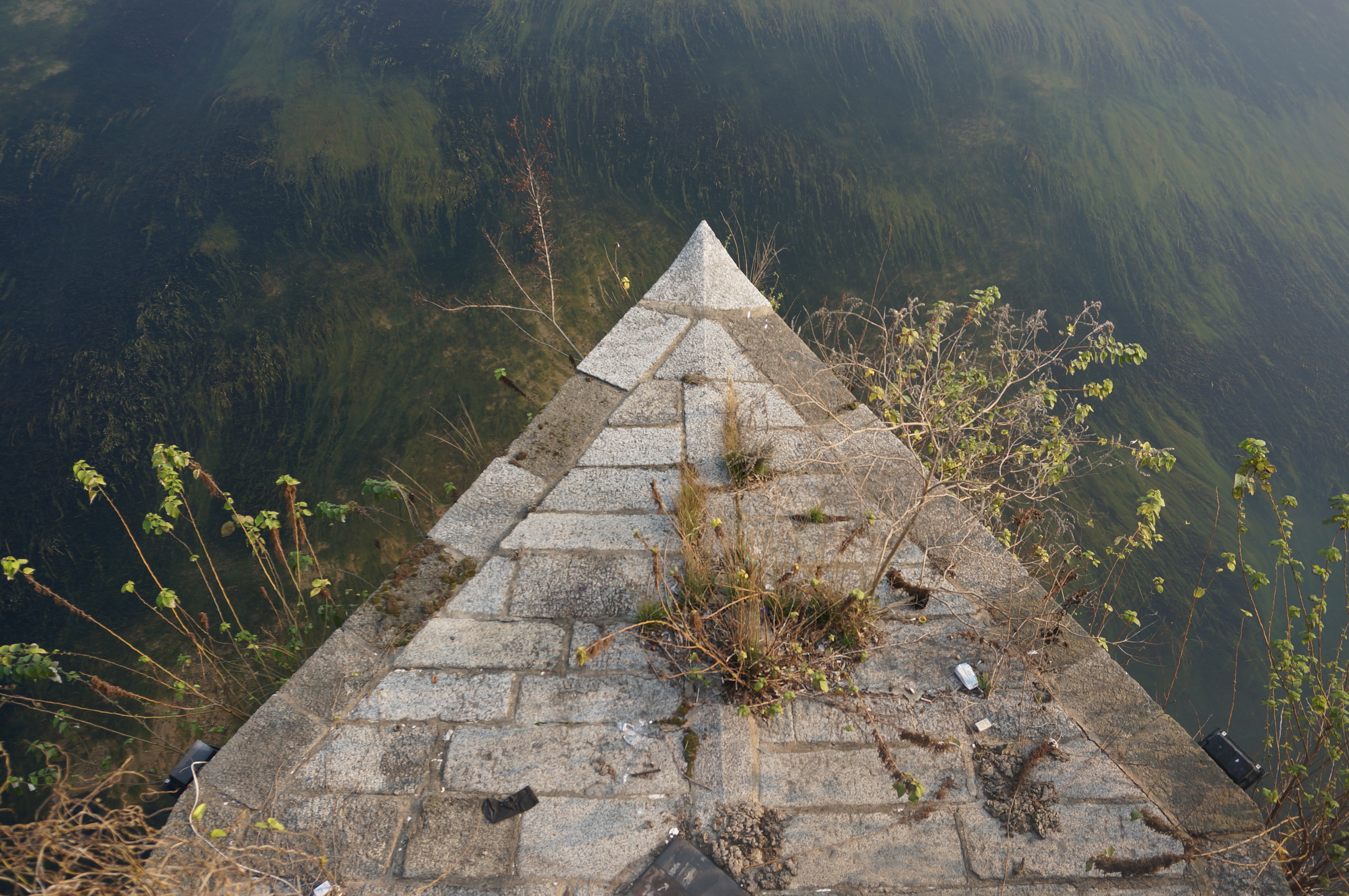
Wannian Bridge in November 2014
