= Taiping Bridge (She County) =

Taiping Bridge 太平桥
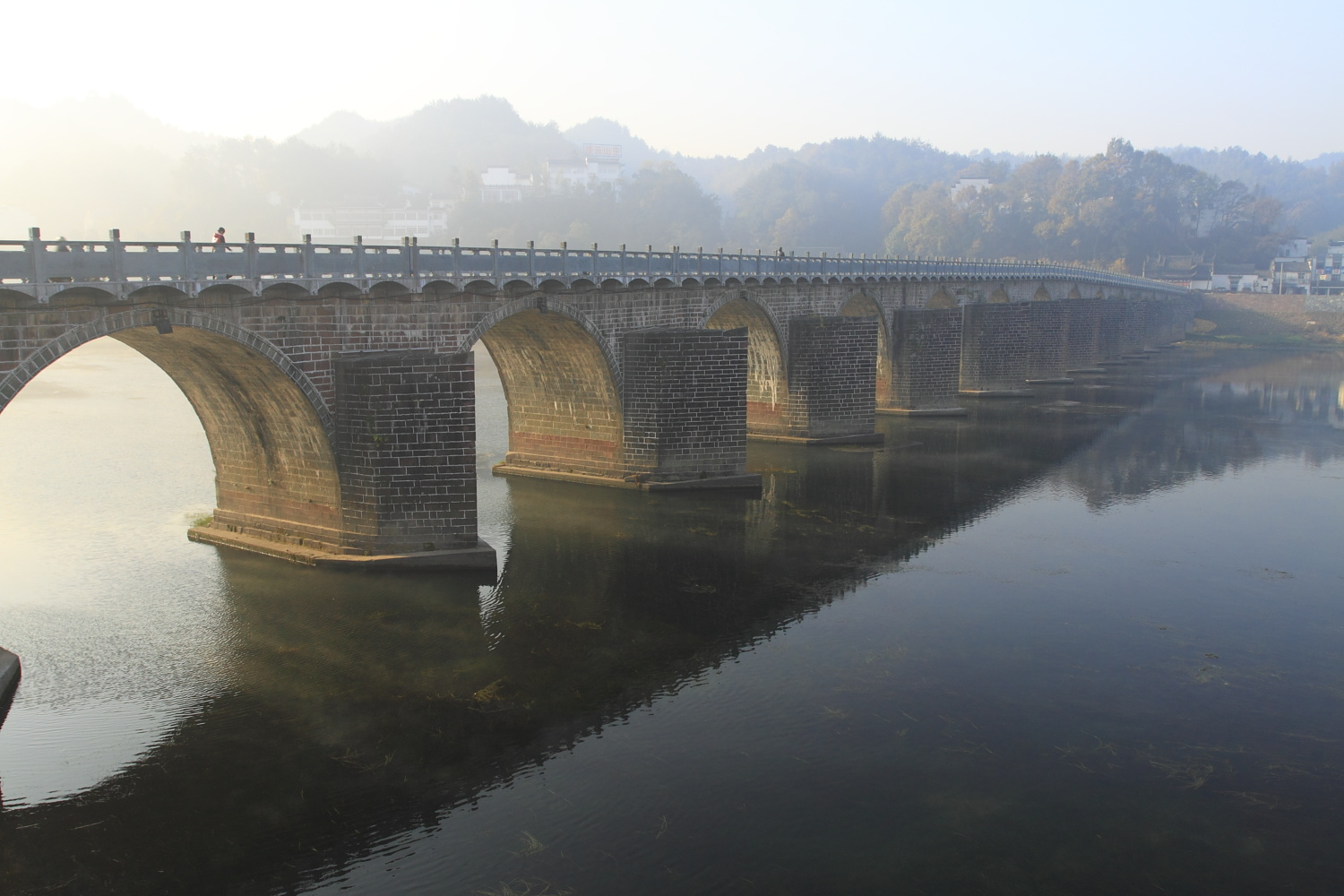
- Taiping Bridge in November 2010
- Coordinates: 29°52′10″N 118°26′27″E
- Carries: Pedestrians
- Crosses: Lian River
- Locale: Huicheng, She County, Anhui, China

Characteristics
- Design: Arch bridge
- Material: Stone
- Total length: 268 metres (879 ft)
- Width: 7.1 metres (23 ft)
- Height: 9.5 metres (31 ft)

History
- Construction end: 1234
- Rebuilt: 1717

Location
- Interactive map of Taiping Bridge

The Taiping Bridge (simplified Chinese: 太平桥; traditional Chinese: 太平橋; pinyin: Tàipíng Qiáo), commonly known as Widow Bridge (寡妇桥; 寡婦橋; Guǎfù Qiáo), is a historic stone arch bridge over the Lian River in the town of Huicheng, She County, Anhui, China.

== History ==
Taiping Bridge was first built as a floating bridge in 1234 during the reign of Emperor Lizong of the Southern Song dynasty (1127–1279) and known as "Qingfeng Bridge" (庆丰桥). A wooden bridge was built in the early Ming dynasty (1368–1644) and was changed into a stone bridge in the Hongzhi period (1488–1506). It was rebuilt in the 56th year (1717) of the Kangxi ear of the Qing dynasty (1644–1911) and strengthened and maintained in 1996.

On 16 October 2019, it was listed among the eighth batch of "Major National Historical and Cultural Sites in Anhui" by the State Council of China.

== Gallery ==
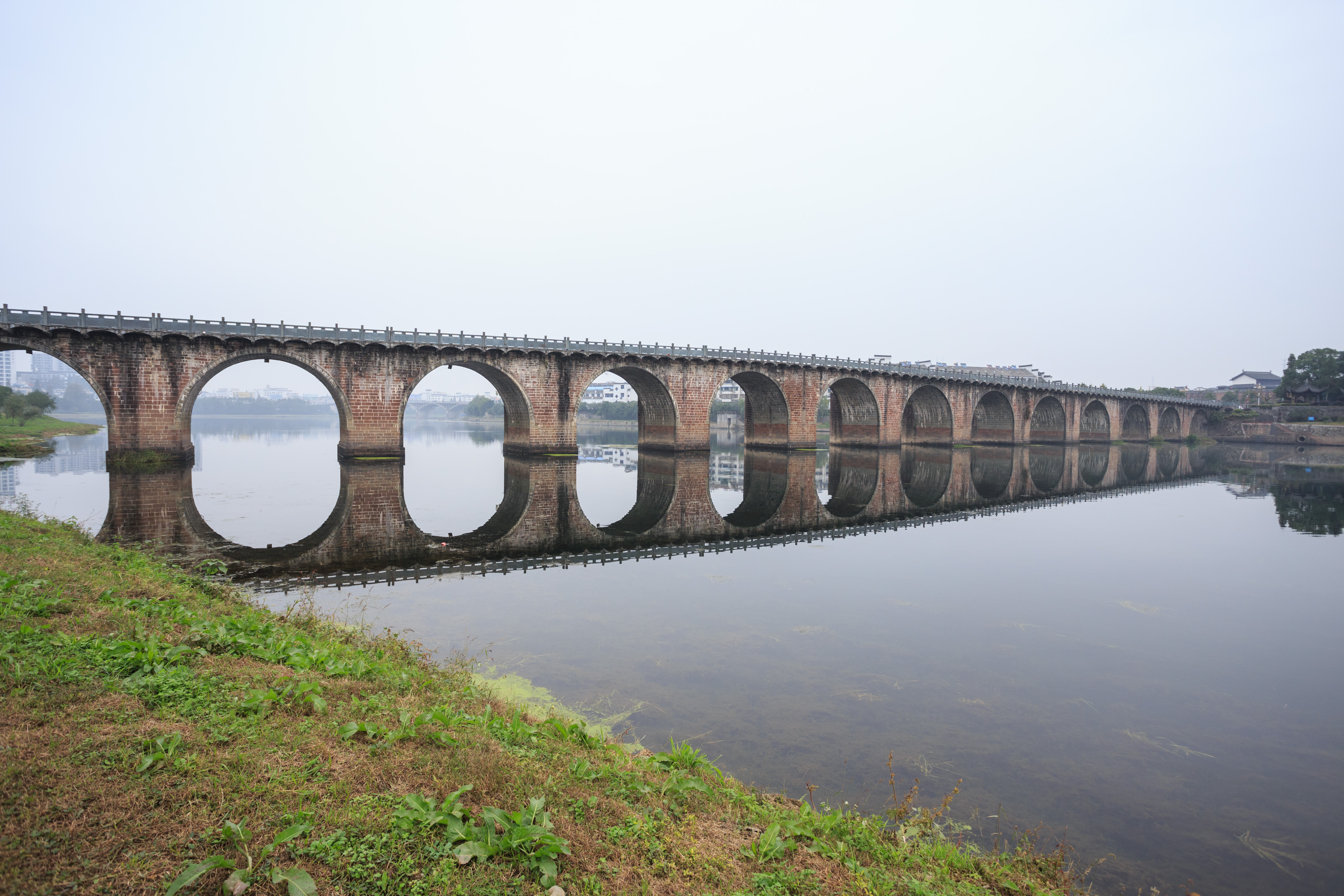
Taiping Bridge in November 2016

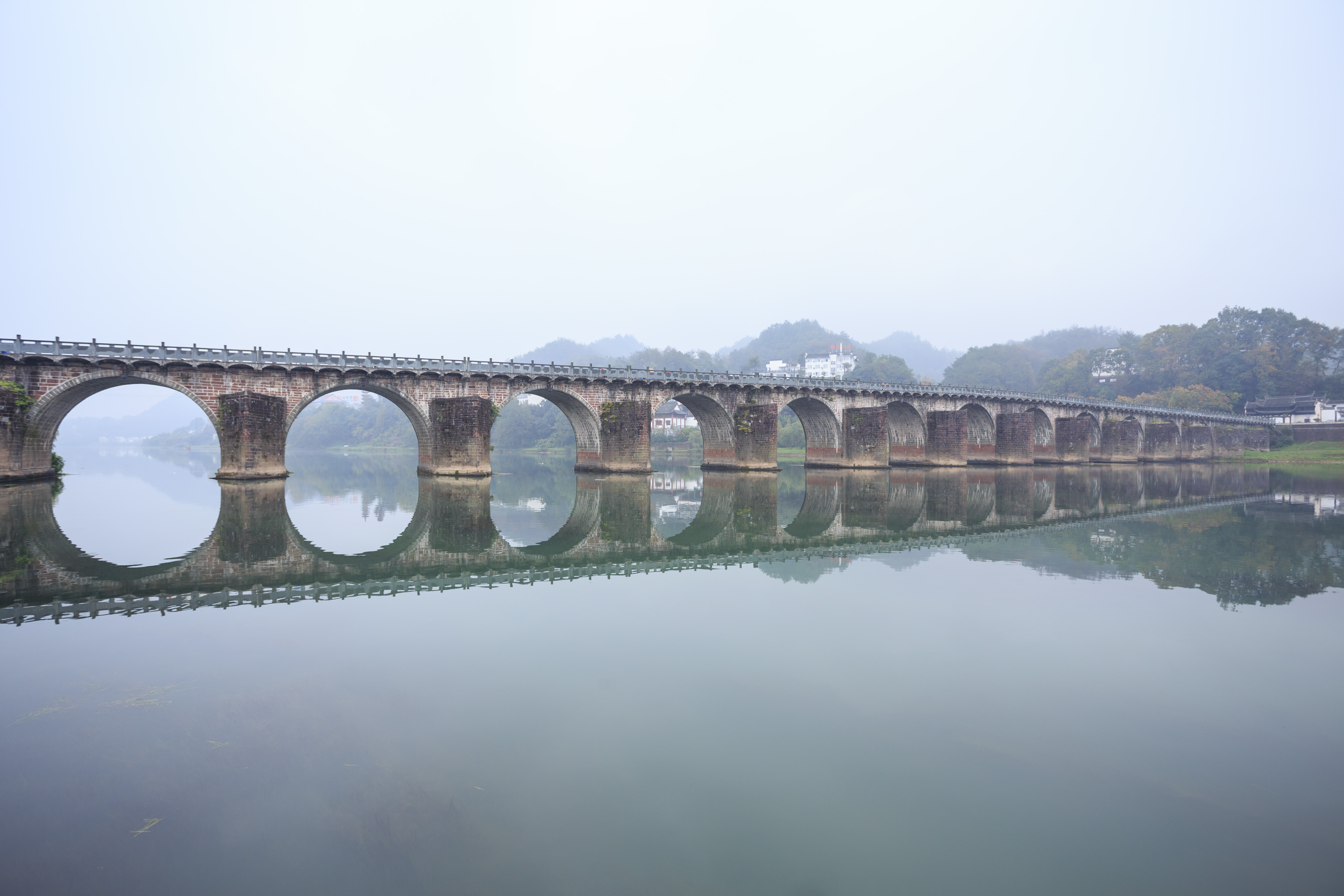
Taiping Bridge in November 2016

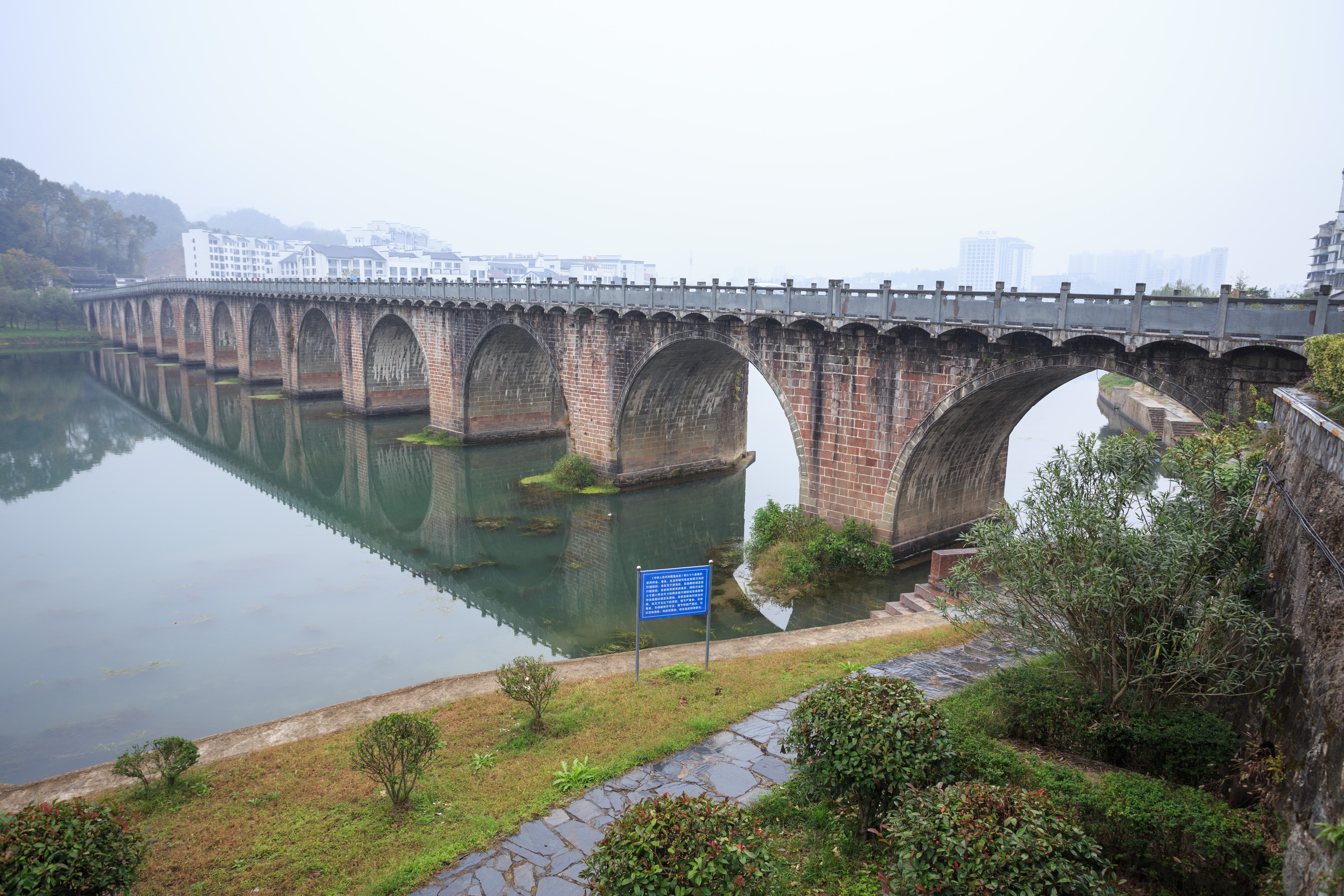
Taiping Bridge in November 2016
