= Wannian Bridge =

Wannian Bridge (simplified Chinese: 万年桥; traditional Chinese: 萬年橋; pinyin: Wànnián Qiáo; lit. 'Ten Thousand Years Bridge'), may refer to:

- Wannian Bridge (Nancheng County), in Nancheng County, Jiangxi, China.
- Wannian Bridge (She County), in She County, Anhui, China.
