= Taiping Bridge =

Taiping Bridge (simplified Chinese: 太平桥; traditional Chinese: 太平橋; pinyin: Tàipíng Qiáo), may refer to:

- Taiping Bridge (Longnan), in Longnan, Jiangxi, China.
- Taiping Bridge (She County), in She County, Anhui, China.
- Taiping Bridge (Shaoxing), in Shaoxing, Zhejiang, China.
- Taiping Bridge (An County), in An County, Sichuan, China.
