= Shanghai Xingzhi High School =

Location
- 99 Ziqing Road, Baoshan District, Shanghai; 201900
- Coordinates: 31.405°N 121.497°E

Information
- Other name: 上海市行知中学
- Type: Public Senior High School
- Motto: Among all teachings, the most important is to teach people to seek the truth; among all learnings, the most important is to learn to be a genuine person.
- Established: July 1939
- Founder: Tao Xingzhi
- Principal: Shen, Wei
- Staff: 130
- Grades: Three-year system (Year 1, Year 2, Year 3)
- Enrollment: Approximately 1,200 (2019)
- Area: About 21.5 acres
- Website: https://school.bsedu.org.cn/xzhs/

Shanghai Xingzhi High School is a school founded in Chongqing in 1939 by educator Tao Xingzhi. The school is located near the Shanghai Wusongkou International Cruise Terminal. Its predecessor was the Chongqing Yucai School.

== School History ==
The school's predecessor is the Chongqing Yucai School, founded by educator Tao Xingzhi in July 1939. The original site was located in Beiquan, a suburb of Chongqing, the provisional capital of the Republic of China. The school opened on July 20, with Tao Xingzhi personally serving as the first principal. In early August, the school moved to Gusheng Temple in Caoshijie, Hechuan County, and later relocated to Hongyan Village in early 1946.

During the war, Tao Xingzhi selected over 150 exceptionally talented children, aged six to fifteen, from fifteen provinces who had fled to the rear and were residing in various orphanages. The establishment of the school received significant attention and support from the Southern Bureau of the Central Committee of the Chinese Communist Party, led by Zhou Enlai. Tao Xingzhi and Lu Ziying (Director of the Beibei Experimental District) also invited renowned figures such as Feng Yuxiang, Shao Lizi, Zou Taofen, and Wu Yuzhang to give special lectures at the school, quickly increasing its reputation. Zhou Enlai personally visited Yucai to meet with the teachers and students, inscribing the words, "Each generation surpasses the previous one."

Leaders of the Republic of China government, including Chiang Kai-shek and Chen Cheng, visited the school, which was effectively managed by the Chinese Communist Party, in 1943 and gave it positive evaluations. The school's activities were reported in the National Government-controlled newspapers "New Women's Movement Communications" and "Modern Women."
