= Jiang Linhe =

Chinese painter

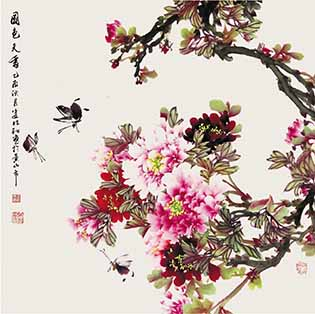
Peony painting by Jiang Linhe

Jiang Linhe (Chinese: 姜林和, b. December 1947) is a Chinese painter, famous for depictions of nature.

Jiang Linhe is also a member of the Chinese Peasants' and Workers' Democratic Party, and is a congressman at the Seventh and Eighth National People's Congress.

== Life ==
Jiang was born in Shexian, Anhui province. Jiang claims to have had no formal training in art, but learned to paint by watching customers of the Shexian Ink Stone Company and later at the Shexian Ink Company, where he worked in his youth.

Growing up near Mt. Huangshan, the landscape inspired many of his works; a 2015 exhibition in Shanghai consists of forty prints of scenes around the mountain. He is also known for bird-and-flower paintings, particularly paintings of peonies, which caused one critic to call him "The Peony King."

He has had solo exhibitions hosted at the National Art Museum of China, as well as smaller art museums across China, such as Nanjing, Hangzhou, Hefei, and Zhuhai. His destinations abroad to present lectures or exhibitions include Japan, Singapore, and the United States. His works are included in the collections of the Zhongnanhai, the Great Hall of the People, and Beijing Rong Bao Zhai in China, as well as the Helen Foster Snow collection at Brigham Young University. He has published three volumes of collected paintings, entitled Jiang Linhe Huaji (姜林和画集).

Jiang Linhe is a member of Chinese Artists Association and the honorary chairman of Huangshan City Artists Association (黄山市中国画研究院院). In 2002, he became president of the newly founded Chinese Painting Research Institute of Huangshan (黄山市中国画研究院).
