= Doushan Street =

Road in She County, Anhui, China

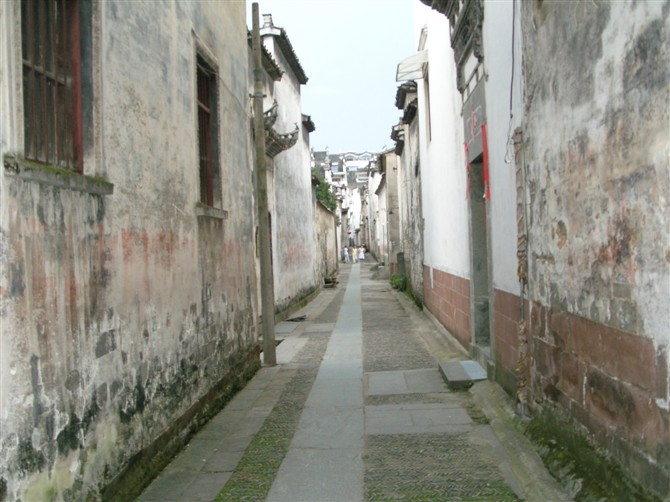
Doushan Street

Doushan Street (Chinese: 斗山街) is a historical residential street in She County, Anhui province, China. It was named after a neighboring mountain hill called Doushan by locals. The street is a noted tourist attraction in the area because it is decorated by the Hui-style mansions built by, and for, the brilliant Huizhou merchants who dominated Chinese business and culture for more than 500 years in history. The most obvious feature of the street is the high-walled courtyards. Hui-style architecture, an important branch of the major Chinese ancient architecture, featured black tiles and white walls, wood and brick carving, zigzag flagging, and grand memorial archways.

Dubbed as "The First Street in South China", Doushan Street was a veritable residential area for the most wealthy and influential in Huizhou during the Ming and Qing dynasties, and home to several very prominent families, including the Wang (王) family, the Xu (许) family, the Yang (杨) family, and the Wang (汪) family.
