= Chiang Chao-shen =

Taiwanese painter

Chiang Chao-shen (Chinese: 江兆申; October 26, 1925 – May 12, 1996) was a Taiwanese calligrapher, painter, and seal engraver, as well as a scholar in the study of Chinese painting and calligraphy. Chiang Chao-shen held prominent positions at the National Palace Museum in Taiwan, serving as the deputy director and Director of the Painting and Calligraphy Department. Chiang, styled Jiaoyuan (茮原), and also known by the studio name Lingou Hall (靈漚館), was born on the banks of Fengxi (豐溪) River in Yanci Town (巖寺鎮), She County, Anhui Province. He died due to a myocardial infarction while delivering a lecture at the Lu Xun Academy of Fine Arts in Shenyang.

== Life ==
Chiang, born into a scholarly family in She County, Anhui, in 1925, was exposed to literature and calligraphy under his parents' guidance and his fourth uncle's introduction to Huang Binhong during his childhood. In the fourth grade of elementary school, he carved a seal for someone, earning recognition from Deng Sanmu. Influenced by traditional family education, he laid the foundation for his future artistic creations.

In 1949, after immigrating to Taiwan, Chiang became a high school teacher and joined Pu Xinyu, whose disciple he became, studying poetry and prose under his guidance.

In 1965, Chiang held a solo exhibition of calligraphy, painting, and seal carving at Zhongshan Hall in Tapiei. The success of the exhibition garnered praise and led to recommendations from Chen Xueping and Ye Gongchao, propelling Chiang into the position of Associate Researcher at the National Palace Museum in Taiwan.

Then Chiang had the opportunity to study a rich variety of Chinese art, benefiting from the extensive collection. He was promoted to Researcher in 1969. In response to an invitation from the U.S. State Department of State, Chiang visited the United States as a visiting researcher for a year. In November of the same year, he published a book titled A Study on Tang Yin (關於唐寅的研究) in 1973, receiving the Chia-hsin Research Award (嘉新優良著作獎) and the Dr. Sun Yat-sen Culture and Arts Award (中山文藝獎) for his travelogue "Hualian Notes" (花蓮記遊冊). Chiang's profound traditional literati background, coupled with his experience in artistic creation, allowed him to present insightful papers and lay the groundwork for academic research and exhibitions.

In 1972, Chiang was appointed Director of the Painting and Calligraphy Department at the National Palace Museum, and in the following year, he organized the "Ninety-Years of Wu School Painting Exhibition". (吳派畫九十年展) During his tenure, he delved into the study of ancient books and paintings, dedicating significant time to the research of Ming dynasty painter Tang Yin, as well as the painters in the Suzhou region during the time of Tang Yin (16th century) and completed the chronology of Wen Zhengming. In 1978, he was promoted to deputy director of the National Palace Museum while retaining his position as Director of the Painting and Calligraphy Department. He served at the National Palace Museum for twenty-seven years. In addition to his academic expertise, he also contributed to the administrative work of the museum.

After retiring in September 1991, Chiang moved to the lakeside of Liyu Pond (鯉魚潭) in Puli, Nantou County, establishing "Jieshe Garden". (揭涉園) During this period, he developed a new style in his ink painting by depicting the scenery of Nantou. He continued to create prolifically, producing high-quality works, and was frequently invited to participate in exhibitions and lectures.

In 1992, his "Wuchen Landscape Album" (戊辰山水冊) was collected by the British Museum, and a solo exhibition titled "Chiang Chao-shen Calligraphy and Painting Exhibition" (江兆申書畫展) was held at the Taipei Fine Arts Museum. The following year, fifty selected pieces embarked on a touring exhibition, starting at the National Art Museum of China in Beijing.

Chiang died suddenly on May 12, 1996, due to a heart attack during an academic lecture at the Lu Xun Academy of Fine Arts in Shenyang.
