= Tao Xingzhi Memorial (Nanjing) =

Tao Xingzhi Memorial, Nanjing
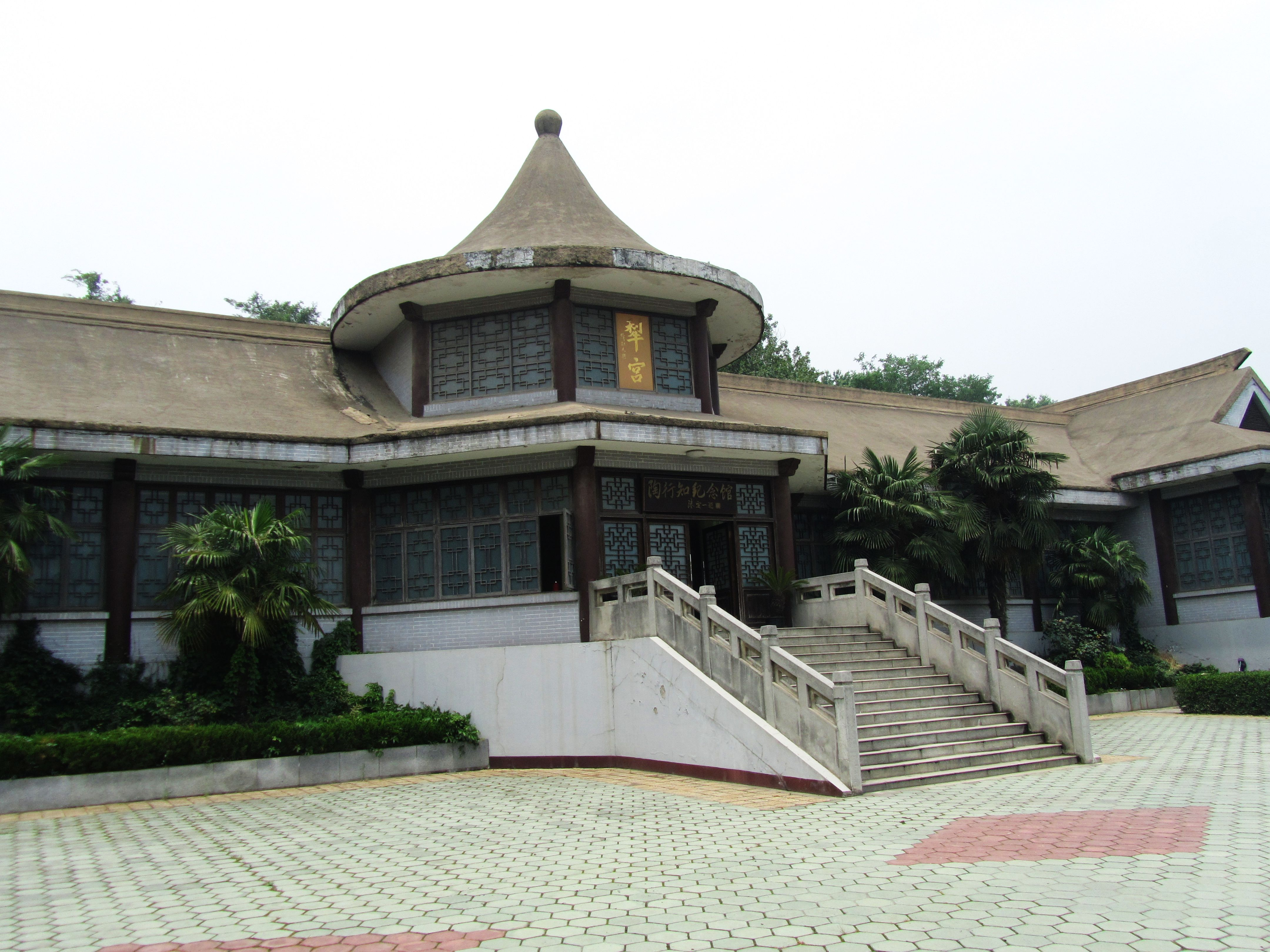
- Memorial Hall of Tao Xingzhi
- Location: Xiaozhuang Village, Qixia District, Nanjing, Jiangsu province, China

The Tao Xingzhi Memorial (Chinese: 陶行知纪念馆; pinyin: Táo xíng zhī jìniànguǎn) is a memorial built in memory of the Chinese scholar Tao Xingzhi, located in Qixia District, Nanjing, Jiangsu province, China.

== Overview ==
The memorial is a tomb and museum dedicated to the life of Tao Xingzhi.

The memorial is 800 square metres (8,600 sq ft) in area. The roof of the 25 metres (82 ft) building, shaped like a thatched cottage, is made from cement. Within the building is a bronze statue of Tao and two exhibition rooms, with 120 pictures, manuscripts, and more than 200 artifacts.

The memorial is managed by the Nanjing Xiaozhuang University, which was established by Tao in 1926 and was initially known as the Xiaozhuang School, or Rural Teacher School.

== Gallery ==
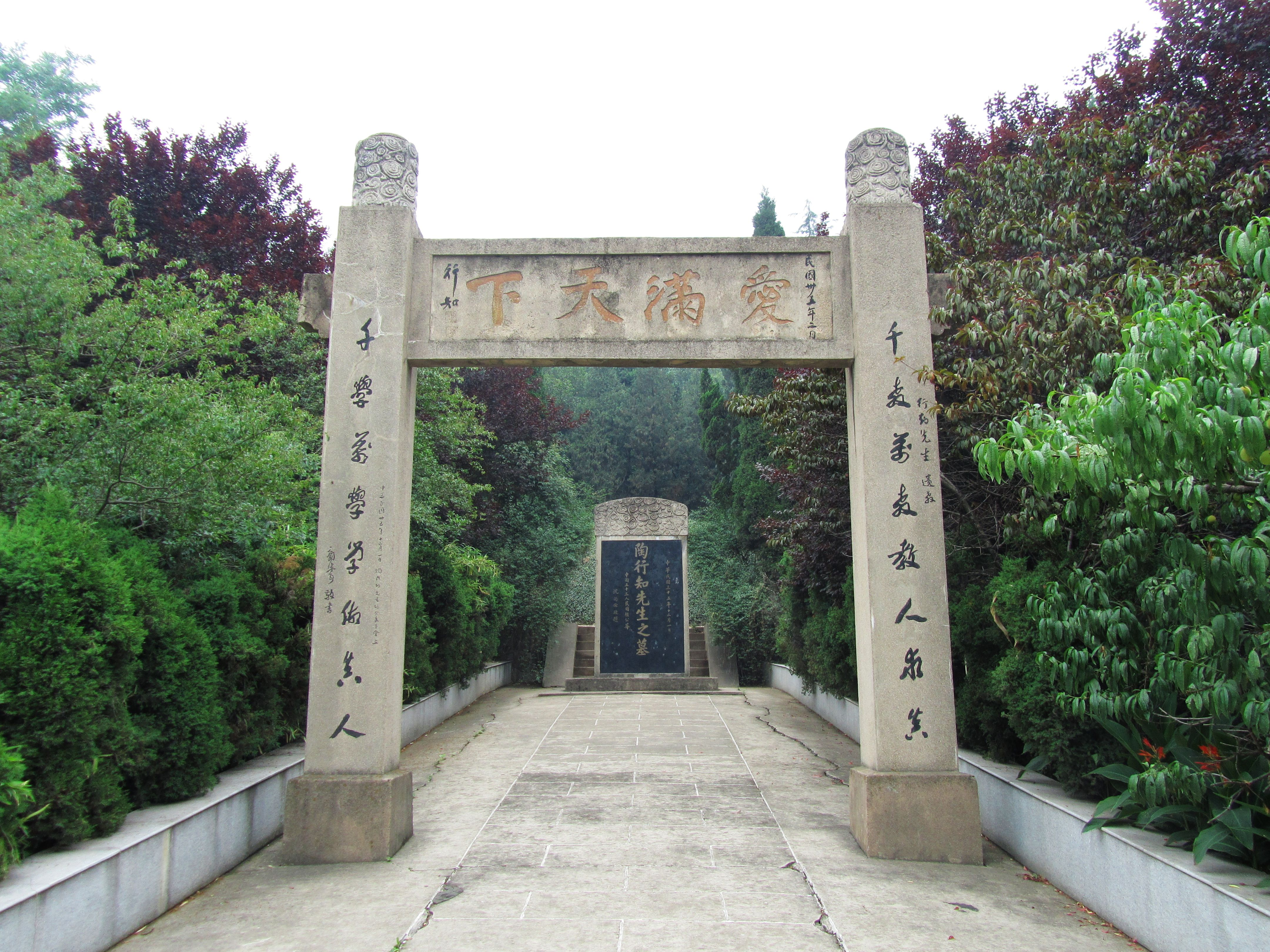
Tomb of Tao Xingzhi

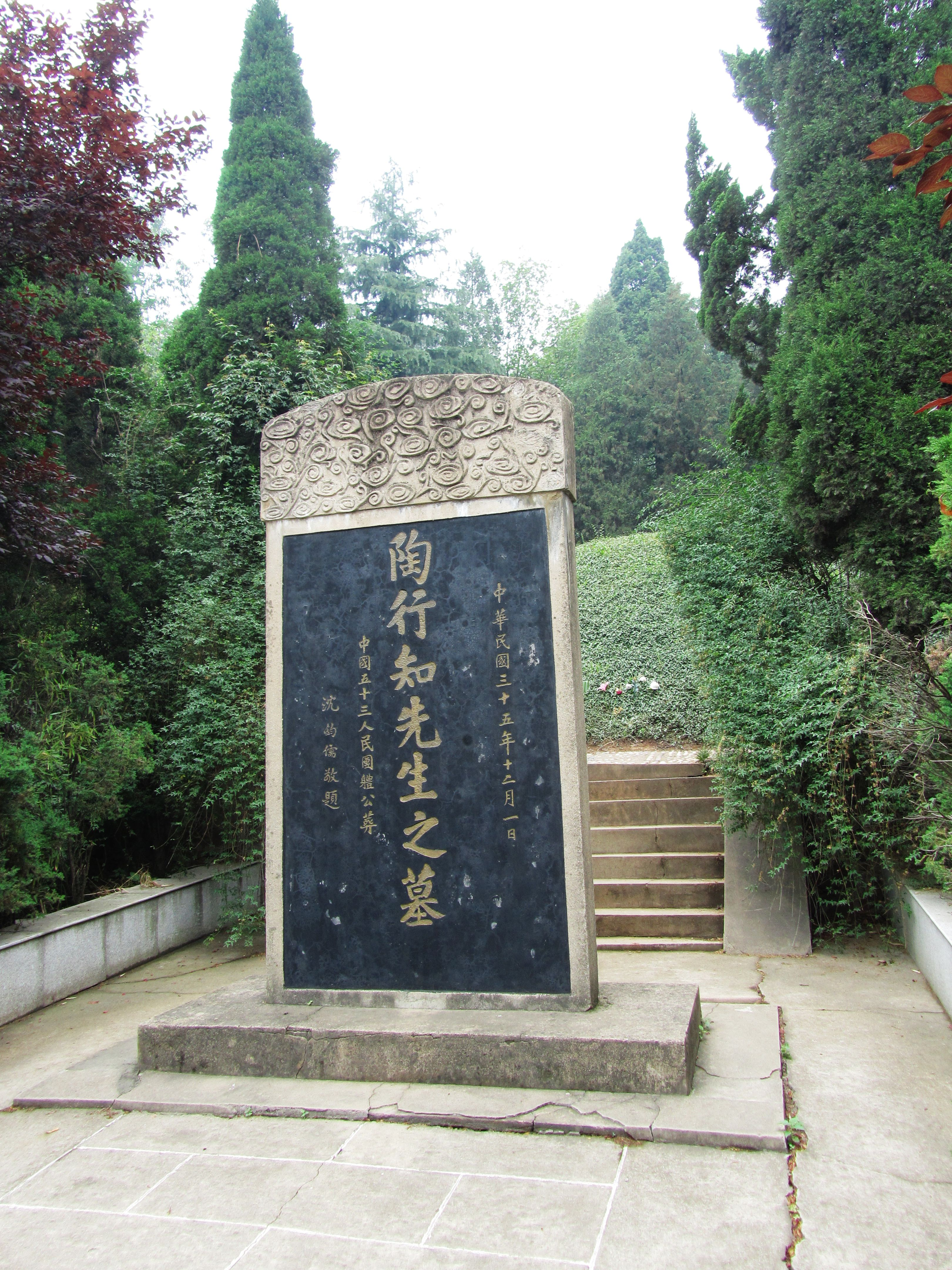
Gravestone of Tao Xingzhi
