= Tao Xingzhi =

Chinese educator (1891–1946)

- 陶行知
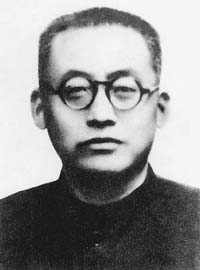
- Born: October 18, 1891; She County, Anhui, Qing Empire
- Died: July 25, 1946 (aged 54); Shanghai, Republic of China
- Education: University of Illinois; Columbia University

Tao Xingzhi
- Chinese: 陶行知
Transcriptions
Standard Mandarin
- Hanyu Pinyin: Táo Xíngzhī
- Wade–Giles: T'ao^{2} Hsing^{2}-chih^{1}
- IPA: [tʰǎʊ ɕǐŋ.ʈʂɻ̩́]

Tao Xingzhi (Chinese: 陶行知; October 18, 1891 – July 25, 1946) was a renowned Chinese educator and reformer in the Republic of China mainland era. He studied at Teachers College, Columbia University, and returned to China to champion progressive education. His career in China as a liberal educator was not derivative of John Dewey, as some have alleged, but creative and adaptive. He returned to China at a time when the American influence was zesty and self-confident, and his very name at that time (zhixing) meant "knowledge-action," reflecting the catch-phrase of the Neo-Confucian philosopher Wang Yangming which implied that once knowledge (zhi) had been obtained, then action (xing) would be easy.

== Biography ==
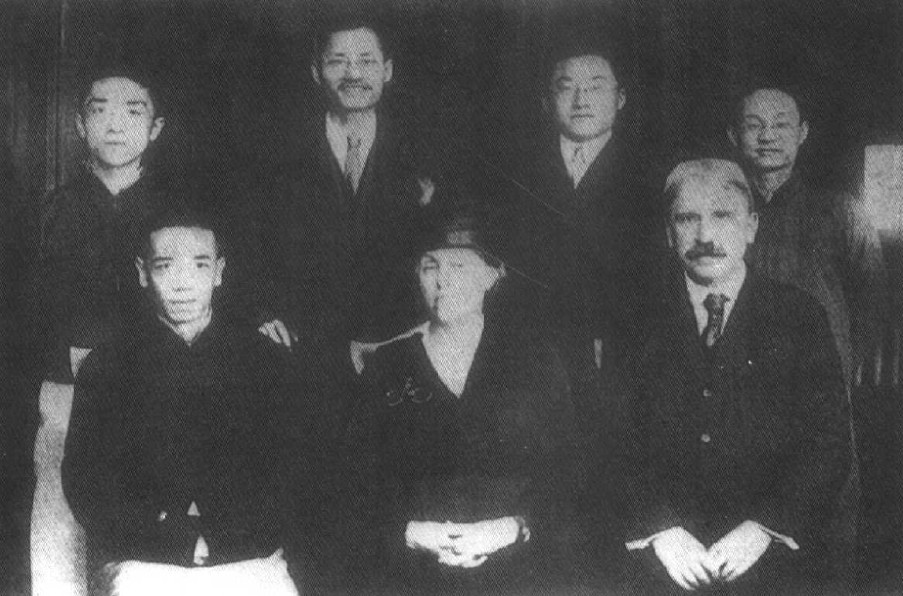
Tao Xingzhi with John Dewey in Shanghai in 1919. Front row from left: Shi Liangcai, Dewey's wife Alice and Dewey. Back row from left: Hu Shih, Jiang Menglin, Tao and Zhang Zuoping.

Tao was born on October 18, 1891, in She County, Anhui. Returning from study in the United States at University of Illinois and Columbia University, in 1917, he joined Nanking Higher Normal School and then National Southeastern University (later renamed National Central University and Nanking University), and he turned to "life education." He then also returned to his humble roots. "Originally," he wrote to his beloved younger sister, "I was a common Chinese, but gradually through ten years of life as a student, I developed a foreign, aristocratic tendency." Shanghai, the capital and center of modern/foreign China, he now found "vulgar, rushed, and crowded." Then "suddenly, like the Yellow River breaking its dikes..., I woke up [juewu, the Buddhist term for satori] to the fact that I was being robbed of my Chineseness." He took to wearing a traditional scholar's gown, and turned to mass education. He then reversed his name to the more well-known form, xingzhi, that is, "action-knowledge," directly implying that (Chinese) action/praxis will produce (Chinese) knowledge. He denounced "false intelligentsia" (wěi zhīshí jiējí 偽知識階級) for drawing on secondhand, foreign experience of which they had no authentic knowledge.

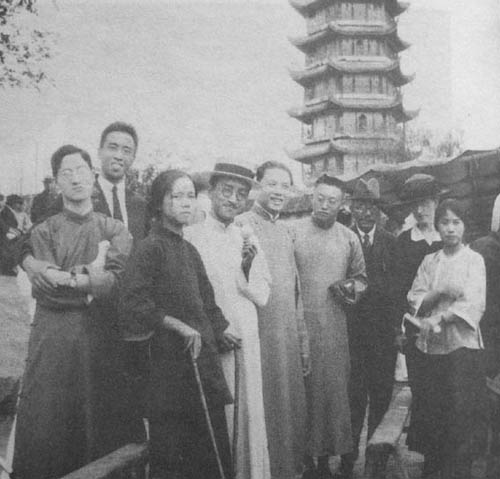
From left, Xu Zhimo, Zhu Jingnong, Cao Chengying, Hu Shih, Wang Jingwei, Tao Xingzhi, Ma Junwu, Alice Dewey and Chen Weizhe in Hangzhou in September 1924.

In December 1921, Cai Yuanpei, Tao, and other educationists founded the National Association for the Advancement of Education (Zhong-Hua jiaoyu gaijin hui) and he was elected as secretary-general. Through the society the educationists promoted the forming of modern education system in China.

In August 1923, Tao and Y.C. James Yen organized the National Association of Mass Education Movements (MEM). At the height of its literacy campaign in the 1920s, Yen estimated that the MEM had taught five million students with more than 100,000 volunteer teachers. Tao went on to become the nation's leading promoter of rural teacher's education. In March 1927, Tao founded the Xiaozhuang Normal College in Nanjing to train teachers and educators, who were then sent to staff rural schools that Tao was establishing in rural China. This teacher's college produced a number of innovative techniques such as the "little teacher model", which encouraged pupils to teach their family what had they had just learned in school, and the "each one teach one" technique of organized teaching networks. The school was closed in 1930 by the Nationalist government for political reasons.

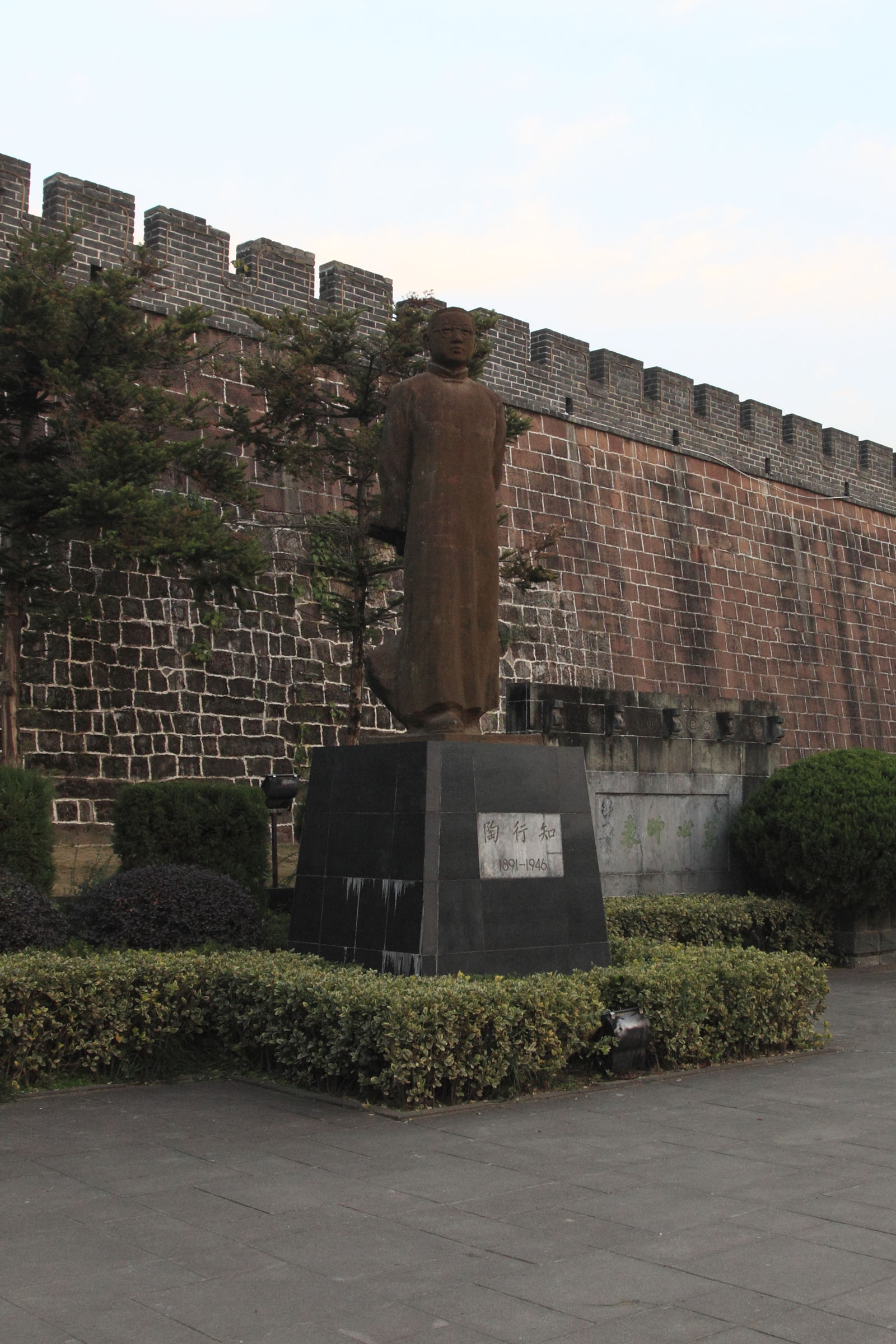
Statue of Tao Xingzhi in his birthplace, She County, Anhui

In the 1930s Tao wrote children's literature, started the Life Education Association, and started a Work Study Movement. He was in the United States when war with Japan broke out in 1937, but returned to China, where he was made a member of the People's Political Council. In 1939, he moved to Beibei, just outside Chongqing, to found the Chongqing Yucai Middle School (School for Nourishing Talent). Tao received monthly stipends from Feng Yuxiang and Zhang Zhizhong, both fellow Anhui natives. A leader of one of the two CCP cells at Tao's school later recalled that Tao and his patron, Feng gave help to party workers when they were hunted by the secret police, and that Tao professed interest in Mao Zedong's "On New Democracy." One of the pupils at the school was Li Peng, the adopted son of Zhou Enlai and future premier of China.

"If one day I am killed by a Japanese bomb, please don't forget that 54.4% of my body was killed by you Americans!"

— Tao Xingzhi, in his plea to the American public in 1937, to stop U.S. material support for the Empire of Japan, just before his return trip back to wartime China

In 1946, after the Yucai School was harassed by the political police, he moved back to Shanghai. Fearing that he would meet the same fate as other intellectuals assassinated by right wing Nationalists, he worked frantically, leading to exhaustion and death. Zhou Enlai rushed to his home and called him a "non-Party Bolshevik." Tao's reputation was high for the next few years, but in the early 1950s he came under attack as a "bourgeois liberal." In the 1980s, the "Tao Xingzhi Study Society" was founded by Song Enrong, who edited a multivolume edition of Tao's writings.

== Nanjing Xiaozhuang Normal College ==
The Xiaozhuang Normal College, which Tao founded in 1927 and was closed due to political reasons in 1930, was reopened in 1951, after the founding of the People's Republic of China, by Wang Dazhi, one of Tao's students and an alumnus of the college. In 2000, the college became the Nanjing Xiaozhuang University.

== See also ==
- Memorial of Tao Xingzhi

== Works ==
- Tao, Xingzhi (2016). The Transformation of Chinese Traditional Education: Selected Papers by Tao Xingzhi on Education. Leiden: Brill. ISBN 9789004302853.
