= She County, Anhui =

Shexian 歙县
- County
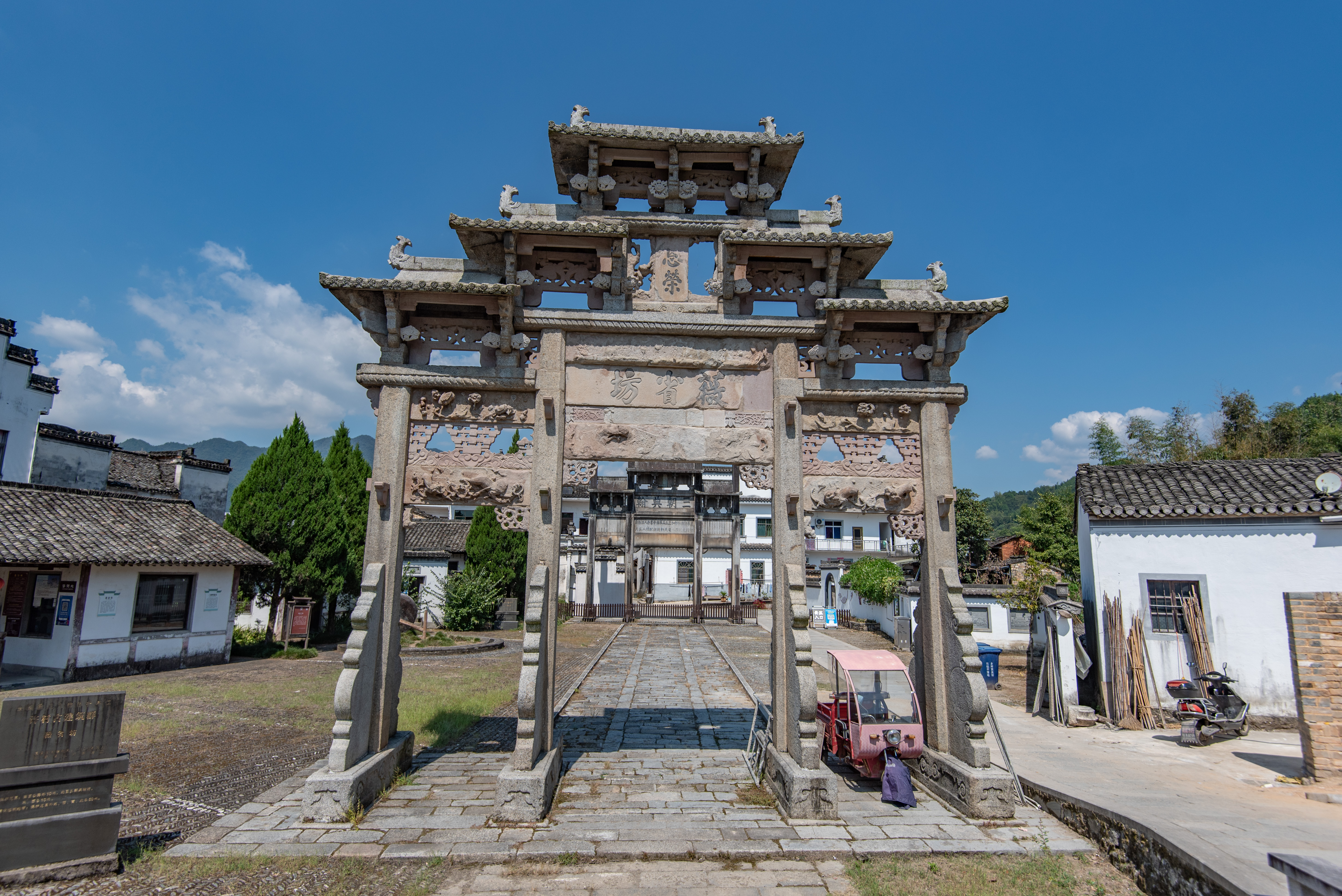
- Xucun Village

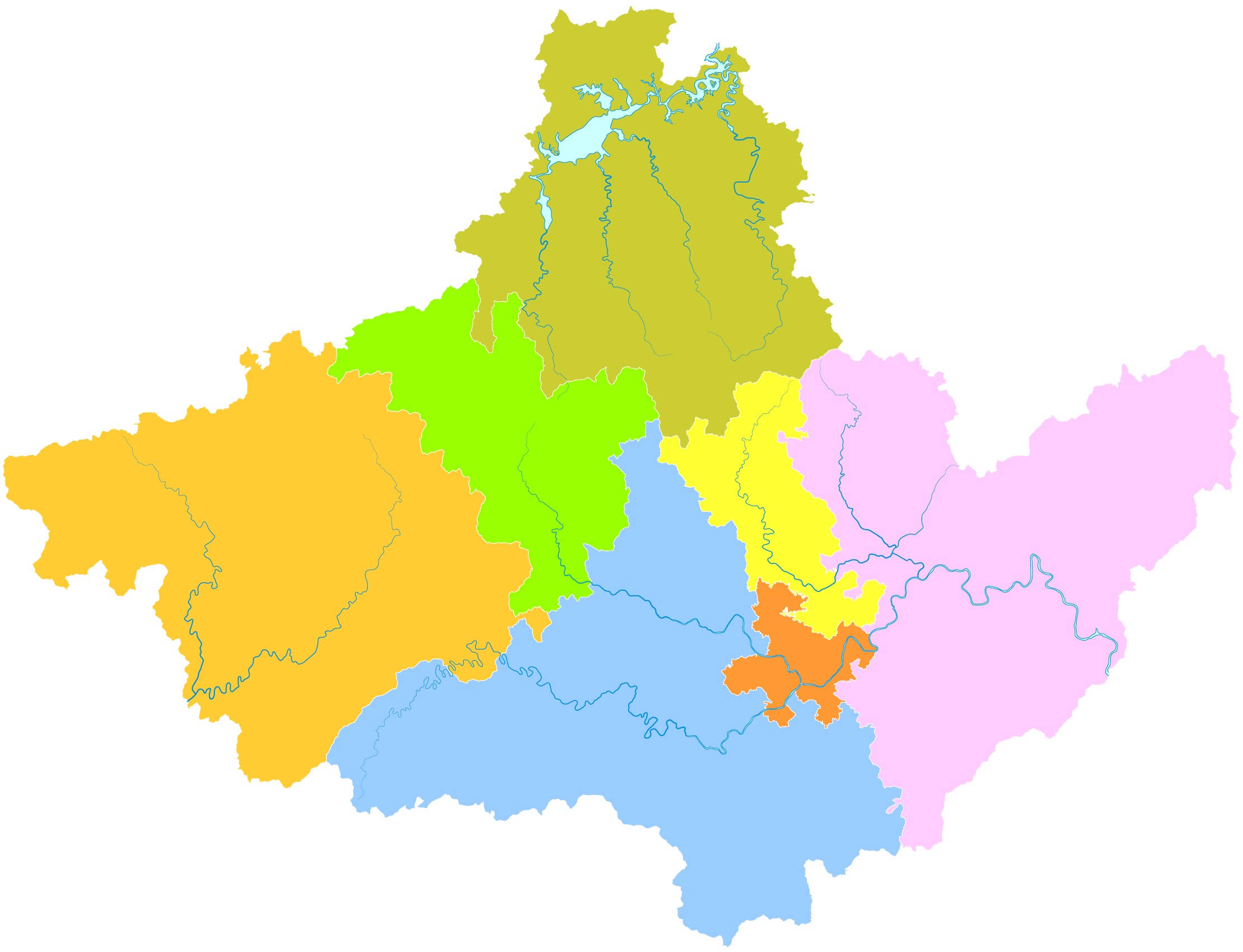
- She County is the easternmost division in this map of Huangshan

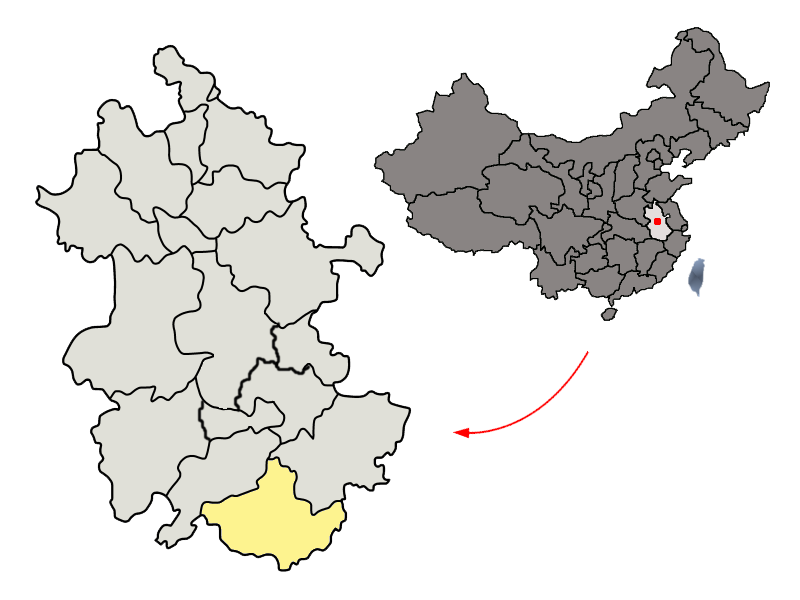
- Huangshan in Anhui
- Coordinates: 29°51′41″N 118°24′55″E
- Country: China
- Province: Anhui
- Prefecture-level city: Huangshan
- County seat: Huicheng

Area
  - Total: 2,122 km^{2} (819 sq mi)

Population (2020)
  - Total: 362,962
  - Density: 171.0/km^{2} (443.0/sq mi)
- Time zone: UTC+8 (China Standard)
- Postal code: 245200

She County (simplified Chinese: 歙县; traditional Chinese: 歙縣; pinyin: Shè Xiàn), or Shexian, is a county in the southeast of Anhui Province, China, bordering Zhejiang Province to the east. It is the easternmost county-level division of the prefecture-level city of Huangshan City. It has a population of 363,000 as of 2021, and an area of 2,236 square kilometres (863 sq mi).

She County is noted for its rich history and culture heritage. Its county seat is sometimes described as one of China's "four renowned ancient towns", along with Langzhong (Sichuan Province), Lijiang (Yunnan), and Pingyao (Shanxi).

She County has jurisdiction over 13 towns and 15 townships. The county seat of government is in Huicheng Town.

== History ==
She County was established during the Qin dynasty (221–208 BCE).

During the Song dynasty, She County leader Fang La rebelled and was suppressed by the Song government.

During the Ming and Qing dynasties, She County was the capital of Huizhou Prefecture.

== Administrative divisions ==
She County is divided to 15 towns and 13 townships.

Towns

- Huicheng (徽城镇)
- Shendu (深渡镇)
- Bei'an (北岸镇)
- Fu'ai (富堨镇)
- Zhengcun (郑村镇)
- Guilin (桂林镇)
- Xucun (许村镇)
- Xitou (溪头镇)
- Qizili (杞梓里镇)
- Xiakeng (霞坑镇)
- Chakou (岔口镇)
- Jiekou (街口镇)
- Wangcun (王村镇)
- Xiongcun (雄村镇)
- Sanyang (三阳镇)

Townships

- Hangkou Township (坑口乡)
- Shangfeng Township (上丰乡)
- Changxi Township (昌溪乡)
- Wuyang Township (武阳乡)
- Jinchuan Township (金川乡)
- Xiaochuan Township (小川乡)
- Xinxikou Township (新溪口乡)
- Huangtian Township (璜田乡)
- Changgai Township (长陔乡)
- Sencun Township (森村乡)
- Shaolian Township (绍濂乡)
- Shimen Township (石门乡)
- Shishi Township (狮石乡)

== Geography ==
She County is a mountainous region with the Huangshan Tianmushan mountain ranges running through it. The Anhui–Jiangxi Railway traverses the county which is also a tea-producing area.

== Climate ==
Climate data for Shexian, elevation 169 m (554 ft), (1991–2020 normals, extremes 1981–2010)
Month	Jan	Feb	Mar	Apr	May	Jun	Jul	Aug	Sep	Oct	Nov	Dec	Year
Record high °C (°F)	24.0 (75.2)	27.7 (81.9)	33.9 (93.0)	34.4 (93.9)	36.8 (98.2)	37.5 (99.5)	41.2 (106.2)	41.3 (106.3)	40.0 (104.0)	36.9 (98.4)	30.9 (87.6)	23.1 (73.6)	41.3 (106.3)
Mean daily maximum °C (°F)	9.4 (48.9)	12.3 (54.1)	16.7 (62.1)	22.8 (73.0)	27.4 (81.3)	29.5 (85.1)	33.5 (92.3)	33.4 (92.1)	29.6 (85.3)	24.5 (76.1)	18.4 (65.1)	11.9 (53.4)	22.5 (72.4)
Daily mean °C (°F)	4.5 (40.1)	7.0 (44.6)	11.0 (51.8)	16.8 (62.2)	21.5 (70.7)	24.5 (76.1)	27.9 (82.2)	27.6 (81.7)	23.9 (75.0)	18.4 (65.1)	12.3 (54.1)	6.3 (43.3)	16.8 (62.2)
Mean daily minimum °C (°F)	1.2 (34.2)	3.3 (37.9)	7.0 (44.6)	12.3 (54.1)	17.2 (63.0)	21.0 (69.8)	24.0 (75.2)	23.8 (74.8)	19.9 (67.8)	14.1 (57.4)	8.2 (46.8)	2.5 (36.5)	12.9 (55.2)
Record low °C (°F)	−8.6 (16.5)	−7.3 (18.9)	−4.9 (23.2)	0.8 (33.4)	8.8 (47.8)	12.5 (54.5)	18.1 (64.6)	18.0 (64.4)	10.3 (50.5)	1.7 (35.1)	−4.3 (24.3)	−14.1 (6.6)	−14.1 (6.6)
Average precipitation mm (inches)	86.9 (3.42)	101.9 (4.01)	166.2 (6.54)	190.5 (7.50)	213.2 (8.39)	357.5 (14.07)	204.3 (8.04)	117.7 (4.63)	76.5 (3.01)	56.7 (2.23)	70.5 (2.78)	58.5 (2.30)	1,700.4 (66.92)
Average precipitation days (≥ 0.1 mm)	13.3	12.9	15.8	14.8	14.4	16.9	12.6	12.2	9.2	7.5	9.8	9.4	148.8
Average snowy days	4.1	2.4	0.7	0	0	0	0	0	0	0	0.2	1.7	9.1
Average relative humidity (%)	76	75	75	75	76	81	79	77	76	73	76	75	76
Mean monthly sunshine hours	102.8	102.8	120.2	141.0	165.1	134.3	207.1	203.9	174.0	167.8	134.7	126.8	1,780.5
Percentage possible sunshine	32	33	32	36	39	32	49	50	47	48	42	40	40
Source: China Meteorological Administration

== Tourism ==
She County has a number of cultural and natural sites that attract hundreds of thousands of tourists each year.

- Xu Guo Gate, a memorial established for Xu Guo, a Grand Secretary during the Ming dynasty.
- Tanyue Gates
- Xin'anjiang (Xin'an River), the major river system of She County
- Yuliang Dam on Lianjian River, a tributary of the Xin'an River.
- Doushan Street

== Notable people ==
Ming dynasty

- Wang Zhi, a powerful pirate during the Jiajing era
- Xu Guo, Grand Secretary under the Wanli Emperor

Modern era

- Tao Xingzhi, educator
- Ke Qingshi, politician
- Chiang Chao-shen, artist
- Jiang Linhe, artist
