= Huicheng, Anhui =

Coordinates: 29°52′04″N 118°26′01″E

Huicheng 徽城镇
- Town
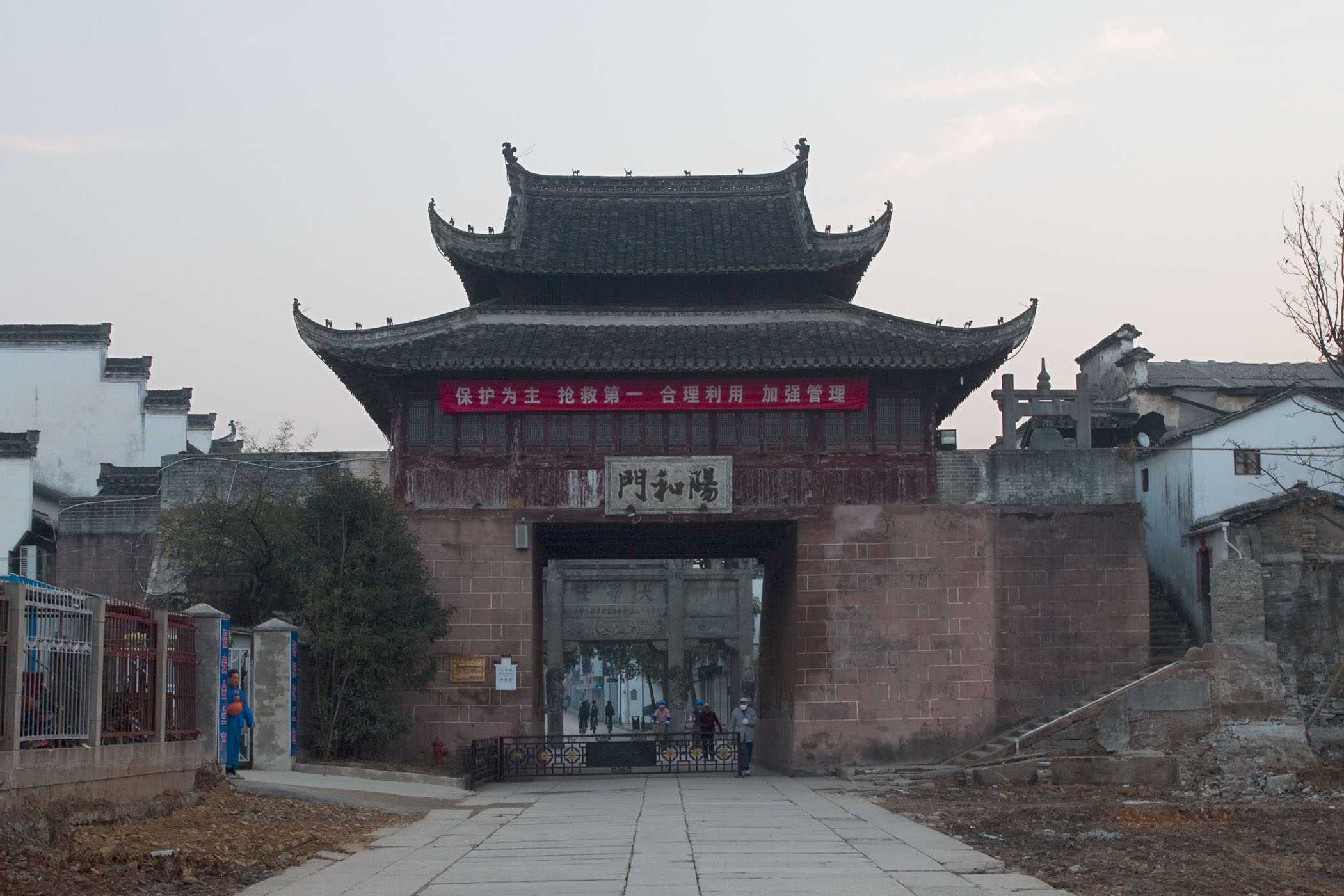
- Dongqiao Lou (Yanghe Gate) of the Huicheng walled city
- Interactive map of Huicheng
- Country: People's Republic of China
- Province: Anhui
- Prefecture-level city: Huangshan
- County: She
- Time zone: UTC+8 (China Standard Time)

Huicheng town (Chinese: 徽城; pinyin: Huīchéng) is the county seat of She County, Huangshan City, Anhui, China.

== See also ==
- List of township-level divisions of Anhui
