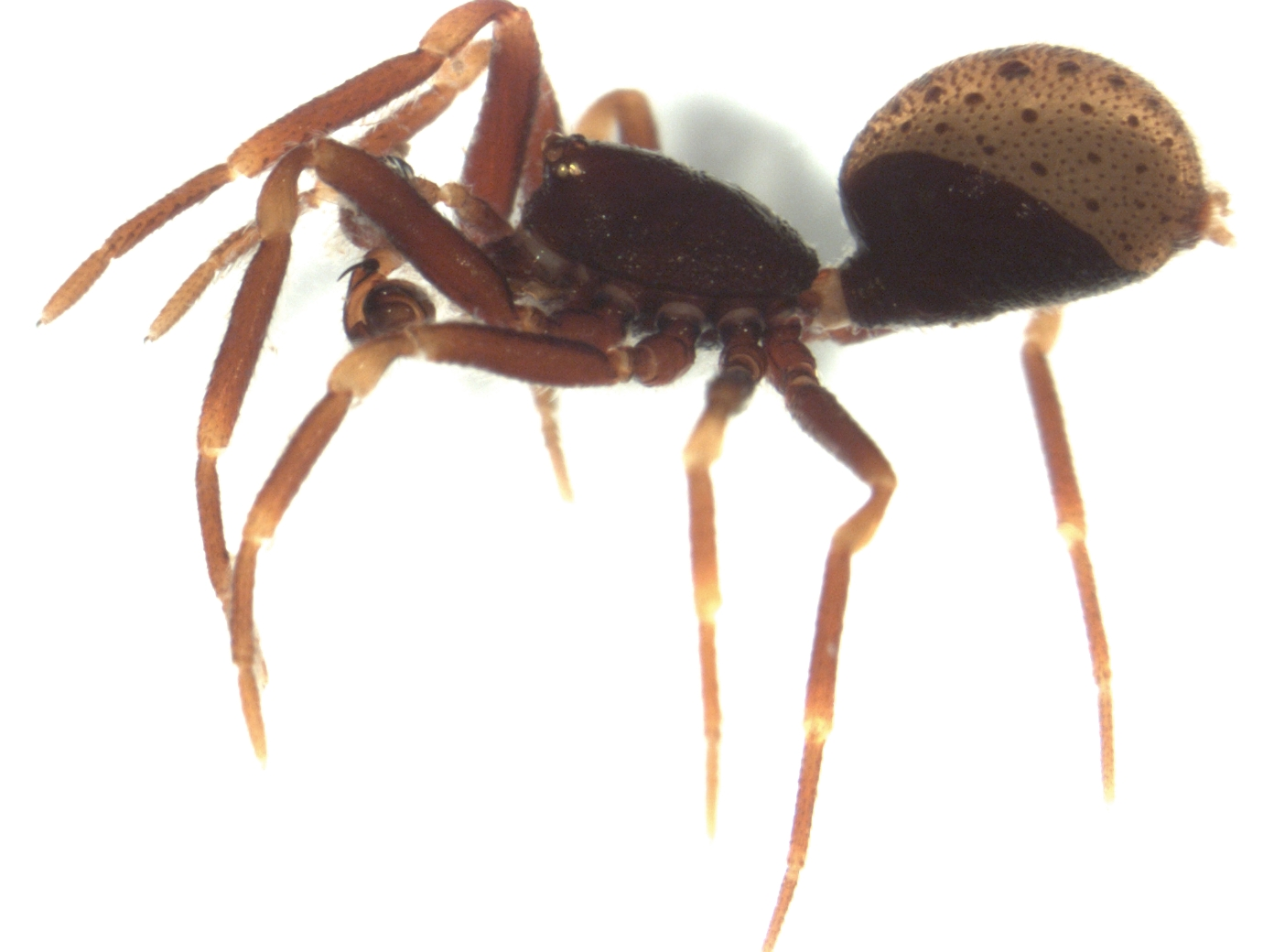

Scientific classification
- Kingdom: Animalia
- Phylum: Arthropoda
- Subphylum: Chelicerata
- Class: Arachnida
- Order: Araneae
- Infraorder: Araneomorphae
- Family: Malkaridae
- Genus: Tingotingo; Hormiga & Scharff, 2020

Type species
- T. porotiti Hormiga & Scharff, 2020

Species
- 4, see text

= Tingotingo =

Genus of spiders

Tingotingo is a genus of Polynesian shield spiders. It was first described by Gustavo Hormiga and N. Scharff in 2020, and it has only been found in New Zealand.

== Species ==
As of January 2022 it contains four species:

- T. aho Hormiga & Scharff, 2020 – New Zealand
- T. porotiti Hormiga & Scharff, 2020 (type) – New Zealand
- T. pouaru Hormiga & Scharff, 2020 – New Zealand
- T. tokorera Hormiga & Scharff, 2020 – New Zealand
