= Tingotingo porotiti =

Conservation status
- Not Threatened (NZ TCS)

Scientific classification
- Domain: Eukaryota
- Kingdom: Animalia
- Phylum: Arthropoda
- Subphylum: Chelicerata
- Class: Arachnida
- Order: Araneae
- Infraorder: Araneomorphae
- Family: Malkaridae
- Genus: Tingotingo
- Species: T. porotiti

Binomial name
- Tingotingo porotiti Hormiga & Scharff, 2020

Species of spider

Tingotingo porotiti is a species of Malkaridae that is endemic to New Zealand.

== Taxonomy ==
This species was described in 2020 by Gustavo Hormiga and Nikolaj Scharff. The holotype is stored in Te Papa Museum.

== Description ==
The male is recorded at 2.63-3.25mm in length whereas the female is 2.92-3.17mm. This species has a red brown carapace, yellow brown legs and a greyish brown abdomen.

== Distribution ==
This species is known from the southern North Island of New Zealand.

== Conservation status ==
Under the New Zealand Threat Classification System, this species is listed as "Not Threatened".
