= Tingotingo aho =

Conservation status
- Naturally Uncommon (NZ TCS)

Scientific classification
- Domain: Eukaryota
- Kingdom: Animalia
- Phylum: Arthropoda
- Subphylum: Chelicerata
- Class: Arachnida
- Order: Araneae
- Infraorder: Araneomorphae
- Family: Malkaridae
- Genus: Tingotingo
- Species: T. aho

Binomial name
- Tingotingo aho Hormiga & Scharff, 2020

Species of spider

Tingotingo aho is a species of Malkaridae that is endemic to New Zealand.

== Taxonomy ==
This species was described in 2020 by Gustavo Hormiga and Nikolaj Scharff. The holotype is stored in the California Academy of Sciences.

== Description ==
The male is recorded at 2.56-3.00mm in length whereas the female is 3.05-3.62mm. This species has a red brown carapace, yellow brown legs and a greyish brown abdomen.

== Distribution ==
This species is known from the south west of the South Island.

== Conservation status ==
Under the New Zealand Threat Classification System, this species is listed as "Naturally Uncommon".
